= List of Seanad by-elections =

By-elections to Seanad Éireann

This is a list of by-elections to Seanad Éireann, the senate of the Oireachtas, the legislature of Ireland, established in 1938. By-elections occur to fill vacant seats which can be caused by the death, resignation, disqualification or expulsion of a sitting senator. By-elections to the university constituencies are conducted on the same basis as general elections to these constituencies. By-elections to the vocational panels are held on a reduced electorate of members of the Oireachas only.

== By-elections since 1938 ==
By-elections in which seats changed parties are indicated with a grey background.

Seanad	Constituency	Vacancy			By-election		
Seanad	Constituency	Outgoing	Party	Cause	Date	Winner	Party
3rd	Cultural and Educational	Thomas Delany	Ind.	Death	22 January 1941	Thomas J. O'Connell	Lab
5th	Labour	John Thomas Keane	Ind.	Death	24 July 1946	Frederick Hawkins	Ind.
5th	Dublin University	T. C. Kingsmill Moore	Ind.	Incompatible office: appointed as a judge	22 November 1947	Joseph Warwick Bigger	Ind.
6th	Industrial and Commercial	Joseph Brennan	Ind.	Death	12 March 1952	Mary Davidson	Lab
7th	Dublin University	Gardner Budd	Ind.	Incompatible office: appointed as a judge	12 March 1952	William J. E. Jessop	Ind.
7th	NUI	Helena Concannon	FF	Death	14 May 1956	John F. Cunningham	Ind.
8th	Administrative	James McGee	Ind.	Death	14 May 1956	William Woods	Ind.
8th	Agricultural	William Quirke	FF	Death	14 May 1956	Joe Sheridan	Ind.
8th	Industrial and Commercial	Matthew Smith	FF	Death	14 May 1956	James O'Keeffe	FG
8th	Industrial and Commercial	Andrew Clarkin	FF	Death	14 May 1956	Seamus Bohan	Ind.
9th	Administrative	John O'Leary	Lab	Death	9 February 1960	John J. Brennan	FF
9th	Agricultural	Patrick Baxter	CnaT	Death	9 February 1960	Martin O'Dwyer	Ind.
9th	Dublin University	William Fearon	Ind.	Death	13 May 1960	William J. E. Jessop	Ind.
9th	Administrative	Patrick Teehan	FF	Incompatible office: elected to Dáil Éireann	1 November 1960	Gerard B. Dillon	FF
9th	Labour	Frank Purcell	Ind.	Death	1 November 1960	Edward Browne	Ind.
10th	Agricultural	John Donnelly Sheridan	Ind.	Death	28 November 1963	Batt Donegan	FF
10th	Industrial and Commercial	Daniel Moloney	FF	Death	28 November 1963	John Costelloe	FF
12th	Agricultural	James Martin	FF	Death	24 February 1970	Cornelius O'Callaghan	FF
12th	Administrative	Patrick Malone	FG	Incompatible office: elected to Dáil Éireann	16 June 1970	Seán Keegan	FF
12th	Dublin University	Owen Sheehy-Skeffington	Ind.	Death	19 November 1970	Trevor West	Ind.
13th	Administrative	Seán Brosnan	FF	Incompatible office: elected to Dáil Éireann	23 April 1975	Micheál Prendergast	FG
13th	Agricultural	Cornelius O'Callaghan	FF	Death	23 April 1975	Pat Codd	FG
13th	Agricultural	Bob Aylward	FF	Death	23 April 1975	Michael Ferris	Lab
13th	Cultural and Educational	Billy Fox	FG	Death (assassination)	23 April 1975	Roddy Connolly	Lab
13th	Industrial and Commercial	Denis Farrelly	FG	Death	23 April 1975	Jack Daly	FG
13th	Cultural and Educational	Mary Walsh	FG	Death	25 October 1976	Vincent McHugh	FG
14th	Administrative	Jack Garrett	FF	Death	7 December 1977	Michael Donnelly	FF
14th	Dublin University	Conor Cruise O'Brien	Ind.	Resignation	11 December 1979	Catherine McGuinness	Ind.
14th	Administrative	Liam Burke	FF	Incompatible office: elected to Dáil Éireann	16 April 1980	Jim Doolan	FF
18th	Industrial and Commercial	Jack Daly	FG	Death	19 December 1988	Tony Bromell	FF
20th	Industrial and Commercial	Seán Fallon	FF	Death	23 February 1996	Sam McAughtry	Ind.
20th	Agricultural	Liam Naughten	FG	Death	28 January 1997	Denis Naughten	FG
21st	Labour	Seán Ryan	Lab	Incompatible office: elected to Dáil Éireann	23 June 1998	John Cregan	FF
21st	Agricultural	Patrick McGowan	FF	Death	9 June 2000	Seán Ó Fearghaíl	FF
21st	Industrial and Commercial	Pat Gallagher	Lab	Resignation	9 June 2000	Jim Glennon	FF
21st	Agricultural	Tom Hayes	FG	Incompatible office: elected to Dáil Éireann	9 December 2001	M. J. Nolan	FF
23rd	Agricultural	Alan Kelly	Lab	Incompatible office: elected as MEP	14 December 2009	Niall Ó Brolcháin	GP
23rd	Agricultural	Peter Callanan	FF	Death	19 January 2010	Paschal Mooney	FF
23rd	Administrative	Tony Kett	FF	Death	26 November 2009	James Carroll	FF
24th	Cultural and Educational	Deirdre Clune	FG	Incompatible office: elected as MEP	10 October 2014	Gerard Craughwell	Ind.
24th	Industrial and Commercial	Jimmy Harte	Lab	Resignation	13 November 2015	Máiría Cahill	Lab
25th	Agricultural	Denis Landy	Lab	Resignation	27 April 2018	Ian Marshall	Ind U
25th	Agricultural	Trevor Ó Clochartaigh	Ind.	Resignation	27 April 2018	Anthony Lawlor	FG
25th	Agricultural	Grace O'Sullivan	GP	Incompatible office: elected as MEP	1 November 2019	Pippa Hackett	GP
26th	Agricultural	Michael W. D'Arcy	FG	Resignation	21 April 2021	Maria Byrne	FG
26th	Industrial and Commercial	Elisha McCallion	SF	Resignation	21 April 2021	Gerry Horkan	FF
26th	Dublin University	Ivana Bacik	Lab	Incompatible office: elected to Dáil Éireann	30 March 2022	Tom Clonan	Ind.
26th	Administrative	Niall Ó Donnghaile	SF	Resignation	29 April 2024	Mal O'Hara	GP
27th	Cultural and Educational	Seán Kyne	FG	Incompatible office: elected to Dáil Éireann	6 November 2026	Ray McAdam	FG

== See also ==
- List of Dáil by-elections
- List of Irish politicians who changed party affiliation
