= 8th Seanad =

Members of the Seanad from 1954 to 1957

←	7th Seanad	9th Seanad	→

Overview
- Legislative body: Seanad Éireann
- Jurisdiction: Ireland
- Meeting place: Leinster House
- Term: 22 July 1954 – 28 March 1957
- Government: 7th government of Ireland
- Members: 60
- Cathaoirleach: Patrick Baxter (CnaT)
- Leas-Chathaoirleach: Liam Ó Buachalla (FF)
- Leader of the Seanad: Michael Hayes (FG)

The 8th Seanad was in office from 1954 to 1957. An election to Seanad Éireann, the senate of the Oireachtas (Irish parliament), followed the 1954 general election to the 15th Dáil. The senators served until the close of poll for the 9th Seanad in 1957.

== Cathaoirleach ==
On 22 July 1954, Patrick Baxter (CnaT), was proposed by Michael Hayes (FG) and seconded by William Quirke (FF) for the position of Cathaoirleach. He was elected unopposed.

On 27 July 1954, Liam Ó Buachalla (FF), Cathaoirleach of the 7th Seanad, was proposed by Frederick Hawkins (Ind) and seconded by Michael Hayes (FG) for the position of Leas-Chathaoirleach. He was elected unopposed.

== Composition of the 8th Seanad ==
There are a total of 60 seats in the Seanad: 43 were elected on five vocational panels, 6 were elected from two university constituencies and 11 were nominated by the Taoiseach.

The following table shows the composition by party when the 8th Seanad first met on 22 July 1954.

Origin Party	Vocational panels					NUI	DU	Nominated	Total
Origin Party	Admin	Agri	Cult & Educ	Ind & Comm	Labour	NUI	DU	Nominated	Total
Fianna Fáil	3	4	2	4	1	0	0	0	14
Fine Gael	2	3	1	2	1	2	0	3	14
Labour Party	0	1	1	1	3	0	0	3	9
Clann na Talmhan	0	2	0	0	0	0	0	1	3
Independent	2	1	1	2	5	2	3	4	20
Total	7	11	5	9	11	3	3	11	60

== List of senators ==
- Note: The entries for Senators who were elected or appointed to fill vacancies are shown in italics

Name	Panel	Party	Notes
Gerry L'Estrange	Administrative Panel	Fine Gael	
James McGee	Administrative Panel	Independent	Died on 19 January 1956
John L. O'Sullivan	Administrative Panel	Fine Gael	
Margaret Mary Pearse	Administrative Panel	Fianna Fáil	
Thomas Ruane	Administrative Panel	Fianna Fáil	
Patrick Teehan	Administrative Panel	Fianna Fáil	
Louis Walsh	Administrative Panel	Independent	
William Woods	Administrative Panel	Independent	Elected to Seanad at a by-election on 14 May 1956, replacing James McGee
Patrick Baxter	Agricultural Panel	Clann na Talmhan	
Patrick Cogan	Agricultural Panel	Fianna Fáil	
Bernard Commons	Agricultural Panel	Clann na Talmhan	
John Mannion	Agricultural Panel	Fine Gael	
James J. McCrea	Agricultural Panel	Labour	
William O'Callaghan	Agricultural Panel	Fine Gael	
Patrick O'Reilly	Agricultural Panel	Fianna Fáil	
Timothy O'Sullivan	Agricultural Panel	Fianna Fáil	
Micheál Prendergast	Agricultural Panel	Fine Gael	
William Quirke	Agricultural Panel	Fianna Fáil	Died on 5 March 1955
John Donnelly Sheridan	Agricultural Panel	Independent	
Joe Sheridan	Agricultural Panel	Independent	Elected to Seanad at a by-election on 14 May 1956, replacing William Quirke
James Crosbie	Cultural and Educational Panel	Fine Gael	
Michael ffrench-O'Carroll	Cultural and Educational Panel	Independent	
Eamon Kissane	Cultural and Educational Panel	Fianna Fáil	
Liam Ó Buachalla	Cultural and Educational Panel	Fianna Fáil	
Thomas J. O'Connell	Cultural and Educational Panel	Labour	
Seamus Bohan	Industrial and Commercial Panel	Independent	Elected to Seanad at a by-election on 14 May 1956, replacing Andrew Clarkin
Denis Burke	Industrial and Commercial Panel	Fine Gael	
Andrew Clarkin	Industrial and Commercial Panel	Fianna Fáil	Died on 23 November 1955
Mary Davidson	Industrial and Commercial Panel	Labour	
Jane Dowdall	Industrial and Commercial Panel	Fianna Fáil	
Seán Hartney	Industrial and Commercial Panel	Fianna Fáil	
John Lynch	Industrial and Commercial Panel	Fine Gael	
Peter Lynch	Industrial and Commercial Panel	Independent	
Edward McGuire	Industrial and Commercial Panel	Independent	
James O'Keeffe	Industrial and Commercial Panel	Fine Gael	Elected to Seanad at a by-election on 14 May 1956, replacing Matthew Smith
Matthew Smith	Industrial and Commercial Panel	Fianna Fáil	Died on 3 November 1955
Richard Anthony	Labour Panel	Independent	
John Butler	Labour Panel	Fine Gael	
Victor Carton	Labour Panel	Fine Gael	
Patrick Crowley	Labour Panel	Labour	
Frederick Hawkins	Labour Panel	Independent	Died on 2 August 1956
Seán Hayes	Labour Panel	Fianna Fáil	
Liam Kelly	Labour Panel	Independent	
Dominick Murphy	Labour Panel	Labour	
Frank Purcell	Labour Panel	Independent	
Seán Ruane	Labour Panel	Independent	
Patrick Tierney	Labour Panel	Labour	
Henry Barniville	National University of Ireland	Fine Gael	
Roger McHugh	National University of Ireland	Independent	
George O'Brien	National University of Ireland	Independent	
William Fearon	Dublin University	Independent	
Owen Sheehy-Skeffington	Dublin University	Independent	
William Bedell Stanford	Dublin University	Independent	
Patrick Bergin	Nominated by the Taoiseach	Labour	
Arthur Cox	Nominated by the Taoiseach	Independent	
James G. Douglas	Nominated by the Taoiseach	Independent	Died on 16 September 1954
John Douglas	Nominated by the Taoiseach	Independent	Nominated on 1 October 1954, replacing James G. Douglas
Henry Eustace Guinness	Nominated by the Taoiseach	Independent	
Michael Hayes	Nominated by the Taoiseach	Fine Gael	
James Hickey	Nominated by the Taoiseach	Labour	
John Meighan	Nominated by the Taoiseach	Clann na Talmhan	
Frank J. Hugh O'Donnell	Nominated by the Taoiseach	Independent	
Patrick O'Gorman	Nominated by the Taoiseach	Fine Gael	
James Reidy	Nominated by the Taoiseach	Fine Gael	
James Tunney	Nominated by the Taoiseach	Labour	

== Changes ==
Date	Panel	Loss	Gain	Note
16 September 1954	Nominated by the Taoiseach	Independent		Death of James G. Douglas
1 October 1954	Nominated by the Taoiseach		Independent	John Douglas nominated to replace James G. Douglas
5 March 1955	Agricultural Panel	Fianna Fáil		Death of William Quirke
3 November 1955	Industrial and Commercial Panel	Fianna Fáil		Death of Matthew Smith
23 November 1955	Industrial and Commercial Panel	Fianna Fáil		Death of Andrew Clarkin
19 January 1956	Administrative Panel	Independent		Death of James McGee
14 May 1956	Agricultural Panel		Independent	Joe Sheridan elected at a by-election to succeed William Quirke
14 May 1956	Industrial and Commercial Panel		Fine Gael	James O'Keeffe elected at a by-election to succeed Matthew Smith
14 May 1956	Industrial and Commercial Panel		Independent	Seamus Bohan elected at a by-election to succeed Andrew Clarkin
14 May 1956	Administrative Panel		Independent	William Woods elected at a by-election to succeed James McGee
2 August 1956	Labour Panel	Independent		Death of Frederick Hawkins
