= 7th Seanad =

Members of the Seanad from 1951 to 1954

←	6th Seanad	8th Seanad	→

Overview
- Legislative body: Seanad Éireann
- Jurisdiction: Ireland
- Meeting place: Leinster House
- Term: 14 July 1951 – 7 July 1954
- Government: 6th government of Ireland
- Members: 60
- Cathaoirleach: Liam Ó Buachalla (FF)
- Leas-Chathaoirleach: Timothy O'Donovan (FG)
- Leader of the Seanad: William Quirke (FF)

The 7th Seanad was in office from 1951 to 1954. An election to Seanad Éireann, the senate of the Oireachtas (Irish parliament), followed the 1951 general election to the 14th Dáil. The senators served until the close of poll for the 8th Seanad in 1954.

== Cathaoirleach ==
On 14 August 1951, Liam Ó Buachalla (FF), was proposed by Seán Goulding (FF) and seconded by Margaret Mary Pearse (FF) for the position of Cathaoirleach. He was elected unopposed.

On 7 November 1951, Timothy O'Donovan (FG), Cathaoirleach of the 6th Seanad, was proposed by Michael Hayes (FG) and seconded by Frank J. Hugh O'Donnell (Ind) for the position of Leas-Chathaoirleach. He was elected unopposed.

== Composition of the 7th Seanad ==
There are a total of 60 seats in the Seanad: 43 were elected on five vocational panels, 6 were elected from two university constituencies and 11 were nominated by the Taoiseach.

The following table shows the composition by party when the 7th Seanad first met on 14 August 1951.

Origin Party	Vocational panels					NUI	DU	Nominated	Total
Origin Party	Admin	Agri	Cult & Educ	Ind & Comm	Labour	NUI	DU	Nominated	Total
Fianna Fáil	3	4	3	3	2	1	0	9	25
Fine Gael	1	3	1	1	2	1	0	0	9
Labour Party	1	1	0	0	1	0	0	0	3
Clann na Talmhan	0	2	0	0	1	0	0	0	3
Independent	2	1	1	5	5	1	3	2	19
Total	7	11	5	9	11	3	3	11	60

== List of senators ==
- Note: The entries for Senators who were elected or appointed to fill vacancies are shown in italics

Name	Panel	Party	Notes
Patrick Fitzsimons	Administrative Panel	Independent	
Michael Hearne	Administrative Panel	Fianna Fáil	
James J. McCrea	Administrative Panel	Labour	
James McGee	Administrative Panel	Independent	
Michael J. O'Higgins	Administrative Panel	Fine Gael	
Thomas Ruane	Administrative Panel	Fianna Fáil	
Patrick Teehan	Administrative Panel	Fianna Fáil	
Patrick Baxter	Agricultural Panel	Clann na Talmhan	
Bernard Commons	Agricultural Panel	Clann na Talmhan	
Patrick Gorry	Agricultural Panel	Fianna Fáil	
James Kilroy	Agricultural Panel	Fianna Fáil	Died on 5 January 1954
Michael Óg McFadden	Agricultural Panel	Fine Gael	
William O'Callaghan	Agricultural Panel	Fine Gael	
Timothy O'Donovan	Agricultural Panel	Fine Gael	
Martin O'Dwyer	Agricultural Panel	Independent	
Patrick O'Reilly	Agricultural Panel	Fianna Fáil	
William Quirke	Agricultural Panel	Fianna Fáil	
James Tunney	Agricultural Panel	Labour	
Michael Hayes	Cultural and Educational Panel	Fine Gael	
Frank Loughman	Cultural and Educational Panel	Fianna Fáil	
James B. Lynch	Cultural and Educational Panel	Fianna Fáil	Died on 12 March 1954
Liam Ó Buachalla	Cultural and Educational Panel	Fianna Fáil	
Patrick F. O'Reilly	Cultural and Educational Panel	Independent	
Denis Burke	Industrial and Commercial Panel	Fine Gael	
Andrew Clarkin	Industrial and Commercial Panel	Fianna Fáil	
James G. Douglas	Industrial and Commercial Panel	Independent	
Jane Dowdall	Industrial and Commercial Panel	Fianna Fáil	
Seán Hartney	Industrial and Commercial Panel	Fianna Fáil	
Peter Lynch	Industrial and Commercial Panel	Independent	
Edward McGuire	Industrial and Commercial Panel	Independent	
Frank J. Hugh O'Donnell	Industrial and Commercial Panel	Independent	
Frederick Summerfield	Industrial and Commercial Panel	Independent	
Pádraig Ághas	Labour Panel	Independent	
John Butler	Labour Panel	Fine Gael	
Michael Colgan	Labour Panel	Independent	Died on 22 June 1953
Noel Hartnett	Labour Panel	Independent	
Frederick Hawkins	Labour Panel	Independent	
Seán Hayes	Labour Panel	Fianna Fáil	
Vincent McHugh	Labour Panel	Fine Gael	
William McMullen	Labour Panel	Labour	
John Meighan	Labour Panel	Clann na Talmhan	
Daniel O'Rourke	Labour Panel	Fianna Fáil	
Seán Ruane	Labour Panel	Independent	
Henry Barniville	National University of Ireland	Fine Gael	
Helena Concannon	National University of Ireland	Fianna Fáil	Died on 27 February 1952
John F. Cunningham	National University of Ireland	Independent	Elected to Seanad at a by-election on 25 February 1953, succeeding Helena Concannon
George O'Brien	National University of Ireland	Independent	
Gardner Budd	Dublin University	Independent	Appointed as a judge of the High Court on 2 October 1951
William Fearon	Dublin University	Independent	
William J. E. Jessop	Dublin University	Independent	Elected to Seanad at a by-election on 12 March 1952, succeeding Gardner Budd
William Bedell Stanford	Dublin University	Independent	
Daniel Corkery	Nominated by the Taoiseach	Fianna Fáil	
Robert Farnan	Nominated by the Taoiseach	Fianna Fáil	
Seán Goulding	Nominated by the Taoiseach	Fianna Fáil	
T. V. Honan	Nominated by the Taoiseach	Fianna Fáil	
Joseph Johnston	Nominated by the Taoiseach	Independent	
Eamon Kissane	Nominated by the Taoiseach	Fianna Fáil	
Seán O'Donovan	Nominated by the Taoiseach	Fianna Fáil	
Seán O'Grady	Nominated by the Taoiseach	Fianna Fáil	
Pádraig Ó Siochfhradha	Nominated by the Taoiseach	Independent	
Margaret Mary Pearse	Nominated by the Taoiseach	Fianna Fáil	
Michael Yeats	Nominated by the Taoiseach	Fianna Fáil	

== Changes ==
Date	Panel	Loss	Gain	Note
2 October 1951	Dublin University	Independent		Gardner Budd appointed as a judge of the High Court
27 February 1952	National University	Fianna Fáil		Death of Helena Concannon
12 March 1952	Dublin University		Independent	William J. E. Jessop elected at a by-election to succeed Gardner Budd
16 September 1952	Labour Panel	Labour		Disqualification of William McMullen due to bankruptcy
25 February 1953	National University		Independent	John F. Cunningham elected at a by-election to succeed Helena Concannon
25 February 1953	Labour Panel		Labour	William McMullen deemed to be elected to fill casual vacancy
22 June 1953	Labour Panel	Independent		Death of Michael Colgan
1 September 1953	Labour Panel	Labour		Resignation of William McMullen to join the board of CIÉ
5 January 1954	Agricultural Panel	Fianna Fáil		Death of James Kilroy
12 March 1954	Cultural and Educational Panel	Fianna Fáil		Death of James B. Lynch
