= List of members of Seanad Éireann who died in office =

The following is a list of members of Seanad Éireann who died in office.

== Free State Seanad (1922–1936) ==
Member	Party	Date of death	Age at death (years)
Thomas MacPartlin	Labour	20 October 1923	44
Stephen O'Mara	Cumann na nGaedheal	26 July 1926	81
Martin Fitzgerald	Independent	9 March 1927	61
Dermot Bourke, 7th Earl of Mayo	Independent	31 December 1927	76
William Sears	Cumann na nGaedheal	23 March 1929	60–61
Alice Stopford Green	Independent	28 May 1929	81
Nugent Everard	Independent	12 July 1929	79
Bryan Mahon	Independent	29 September 1930	68
Patrick W. Kenny	Independent	22 April 1931	67–68
Patrick Hooper	Independent	6 September 1931	58
Ellen Cuffe, Countess of Desart	Independent	29 June 1933	75
Séamus Ryan	Fianna Fáil	30 June 1933	37
George Crosbie	Cumann na nGaedheal	27 November 1934	70

== Seanad Éireann (since 1937) ==
Member	Party	Panel/Constituency	Date of death	Age at death (years)	Cause
Thomas Delany	Independent	Cultural and Educational	9 July 1939	70–71	
Maurice George Moore	Independent	Nominated by the Taoiseach	8 September 1939	85	
Patrick Keohane	Independent	Nominated by the Taoiseach	4 December 1939	68–69	
Peadar Toner Mac Fhionnlaoich	Independent	Nominated by the Taoiseach	1 July 1942	85	
Pádraic Ó Máille	Fianna Fáil	Nominated by the Taoiseach	19 January 1946	67	
William Magennis	Independent	Nominated by the Taoiseach	30 March 1946	78	
John Thomas Keane	Independent	Labour	22 May 1946		
Thomas Kennedy	Labour	Labour	18 September 1947	59–60	
Joseph Brennan	Independent	Industrial and Commercial	1 February 1950		
Seán Campbell	Labour	Labour	27 February 1950	60	
Helena Concannon	Fianna Fáil	National University	27 February 1952	73	
Michael Colgan	Independent	Labour	22 June 1953		
James Kilroy	Fianna Fáil	Agricultural	5 January 1954	63–64	
James B. Lynch	Fianna Fáil	Industrial and Commercial	12 March 1954	64–65	
James G. Douglas	Independent	Nominated by the Taoiseach	16 September 1954	67	
William Quirke	Fianna Fáil	Agricultural	5 March 1955	58–59	
Matthew Smith	Fianna Fáil	Industrial and Commercial	3 November 1955		
Andrew Clarkin	Fianna Fáil	Industrial and Commercial	23 November 1955	63–64	
James McGee	Independent	Industrial and Commercial	19 January 1956	70	
Frederick Hawkins	Independent	Labour	2 August 1956		
Seán Moylan	Fianna Fáil	Nominated by the Taoiseach	16 November 1957	67	
Patrick Baxter	Clann na Talmhan	Agricultural	3 April 1959	67	
John O'Leary	Labour	Administrative	21 June 1959	64	
William Fearon	Independent	Dublin University	27 December 1959	67	
Frank Purcell	Independent	Labour	2 April 1960		
Henry Barniville	Fine Gael	National University	23 September 1960	73	
John Donnelly Sheridan	Independent	Agricultural	5 April 1963		
Daniel Moloney	Fianna Fáil	Industrial and Commercial	26 June 1963	53	
Pádraig Ó Siochfhradha	Independent	Nominated by the Taoiseach	19 November 1964	81	
Margaret Mary Pearse	Fianna Fáil	Administrative	7 November 1968	90	
James Martin	Fianna Fáil	Agricultural	3 October 1969	63–64	
Owen Sheehy-Skeffington	Independent	Dublin University	7 June 1970	61	Heart attack
Jimmy Dunne	Labour	Labour	23 February 1972	50–51	
Cornelius O'Callaghan	Fianna Fáil	Agricultural	24 January 1974	51–52	
Billy Fox	Fine Gael	Cultural and Educational	12 March 1974	35	Assassination – shot during the Troubles
Bob Aylward	Fianna Fáil	Agricultural	18 July 1974	63	
Denis Farrelly	Fine Gael	Industrial and Commercial	27 December 1974	62	
Mary Walsh	Fine Gael	Cultural and Educational	18 August 1976	46	
Jack Garrett	Fianna Fáil	Administrative	11 September 1977	63	
Jack Daly	Fine Gael	Industrial and Commercial	5 May 1988	72	
Gordon Wilson	Independent	Nominated by the Taoiseach	27 June 1995	67	Heart attack
Seán Fallon	Fianna Fáil	Industrial and Commercial	4 July 1995	57	
Liam Naughten	Fine Gael	Agricultural	16 November 1996	52	Traffic accident
Patrick McGowan	Fianna Fáil	Agricultural	3 October 1999	73	
Kate Walsh	Progressive Democrats	Nominated by the Taoiseach	24 April 2007	60	Complications from diabetes
Tony Kett	Fianna Fáil	Administrative	19 April 2009	57	Cancer
Peter Callanan	Fianna Fáil	Agricultural	11 October 2009	74	
Kieran Phelan	Fianna Fáil	Industrial and Commercial	26 May 2010	60	

== See also ==
- List of members of Dáil Éireann who died in office
