= 5th Seanad =

Members of the Seanad from 1944 to 1948

←	4th Seanad	6th Seanad	→

Overview
- Legislative body: Seanad Éireann
- Jurisdiction: Ireland
- Meeting place: Leinster House
- Term: 18 August 1944 – 12 March 1948
- Government: 4th Government of Ireland
- Members: 60
- Cathaoirleach: Seán Goulding (FF)
- Leas-Chathaoirleach: Timothy O'Donovan (FG)
- Leader of the Seanad: William Quirke (FF)

The 5th Seanad was in office from 1944 to 1948. An election to Seanad Éireann, the senate of the Oireachtas (Irish parliament), followed the 1944 general election to the 12th Dáil. The senators served until the close of poll for the 6th Seanad in 1948.

== Cathaoirleach ==
On 18 August 1944, Seán Goulding (FF) was proposed by Helena Concannon (FF) and seconded by Pádraic Ó Máille (FF) for the position of Cathaoirleach. He was elected unopposed.

On 25 October 1944, Timothy O'Donovan (FG) was proposed by Michael Hayes (FG) and seconded by Patrick Baxter (CnaT) for the position of Leas-Chathaoirleach. He was elected unopposed.

== Composition of the 5th Seanad ==
There are a total of 60 seats in the Seanad: 43 were elected on five vocational panels, 6 were elected from two university constituencies and 11 were nominated by the Taoiseach.

The following table shows the composition by party when the 5th Seanad first met on 18 August 1944.

Origin Party	Vocational panels					NUI	DU	Nominated	Total
Origin Party	Admin	Agri	Cult & Educ	Ind & Comm	Labour	NUI	DU	Nominated	Total
Fianna Fáil	5	4	2	3	0	1	0	7	22
Fine Gael	1	3	2	2	1	1	0	0	10
Labour Party	0	0	0	1	4	0	0	2	7
Clann na Talmhan	0	2	0	0	1	0	0	0	3
Independent	1	2	1	3	5	1	3	2	18
Total	7	11	5	9	11	3	3	11	60

== List of senators ==
- Note: The entries for Senators who were elected or appointed to fill vacancies are shown in italics

Name	Panel	Party	Notes
Andrew Clarkin	Administrative Panel	Fianna Fáil	
Seán Goulding	Administrative Panel	Fianna Fáil	
Michael Hayes	Administrative Panel	Fine Gael	
Denis Healy	Administrative Panel	Fianna Fáil	
Michael Hearne	Administrative Panel	Fianna Fáil	
James McGee	Administrative Panel	Independent	
Thomas Ruane	Administrative Panel	Fianna Fáil	
Patrick Baxter	Agricultural Panel	Clann na Talmhan	
John Counihan	Agricultural Panel	Independent	
Daniel Hogan	Agricultural Panel	Fianna Fáil	
Edmund Horan	Agricultural Panel	Clann na Talmhan	
Patrick Kehoe	Agricultural Panel	Fianna Fáil	
Dominick MacCabe	Agricultural Panel	Independent	
William O'Callaghan	Agricultural Panel	Fine Gael	
Timothy O'Donovan	Agricultural Panel	Fine Gael	
Patrick O'Reilly	Agricultural Panel	Fianna Fáil	
William Quirke	Agricultural Panel	Fianna Fáil	
Gerard Sweetman	Agricultural Panel	Fine Gael	Elected to 13th Dáil at the general election on 4 February 1948
Patrick Doyle	Cultural and Educational Panel	Fine Gael	
Louis O'Dea	Cultural and Educational Panel	Fianna Fáil	
Seán O'Donovan	Cultural and Educational Panel	Fianna Fáil	
Patrick J. O'Reilly	Cultural and Educational Panel	Independent	
James Parkinson	Cultural and Educational Panel	Fine Gael	Resigned on 31 July 1947 due to ill-health
Thomas Condon	Industrial and Commercial Panel	Independent	Disqualified from the Seanad on 25 October 1944 by virtue of his membership of the Irish Tourist Board
Daniel Corkery	Industrial and Commercial Panel	Fianna Fáil	
James Crosbie	Industrial and Commercial Panel	Fine Gael	
Tadhg Crowley	Industrial and Commercial Panel	Fianna Fáil	
James G. Douglas	Industrial and Commercial Panel	Independent	
Luke Duffy	Industrial and Commercial Panel	Labour	
Peter Trainor Kelly	Industrial and Commercial Panel	Independent	
Seán MacEllin	Industrial and Commercial Panel	Fianna Fáil	
David Madden	Industrial and Commercial Panel	Fine Gael	Elected to 13th Dáil at the general election on 4 February 1948
Frederick Summerfield	Industrial and Commercial Panel	Independent	Elected on 7 March 1945, replacing Thomas Condon
John Butler	Labour Panel	Fine Gael	
Thomas Hayden	Labour Panel	Labour	
Frederick Hawkins	Labour Panel	Independent	Elected to Seanad at a by-election on 24 July 1946, replacing John Thomas Keane
James Johnston	Labour Panel	Independent	
John Thomas Keane	Labour Panel	Independent	Died on 22 May 1946
Thomas Kennedy	Labour Panel	Labour	Died on 18 September 1947
Sam Kyle	Labour Panel	Labour	
Peter Lynch	Labour Panel	Independent	
John Meighan	Labour Panel	Clann na Talmhan	
Seán Ruane	Labour Panel	Independent	
Michael Smyth	Labour Panel	Independent	
James Tunney	Labour Panel	Labour	
Henry Barniville	National University of Ireland	Fine Gael	
Helena Concannon	National University of Ireland	Fianna Fáil	
Michael J. Ryan	National University of Ireland	Independent	
Joseph Warwick Bigger	Dublin University	Independent	Elected to Seanad at a by-election on 22 November 1947, replacing T. C. Kingsmill Moore
William Fearon	Dublin University	Independent	
Joseph Johnston	Dublin University	Independent	
T. C. Kingsmill Moore	Dublin University	Independent	Appointed as a judge of the High Court on 11 June 1947
Seán Campbell	Nominated by the Taoiseach	Labour	
Robert Farnan	Nominated by the Taoiseach	Fianna Fáil	
Thomas Foran	Nominated by the Taoiseach	Labour	
T. V. Honan	Nominated by the Taoiseach	Fianna Fáil	
Sir John Keane	Nominated by the Taoiseach	Independent	
Margaret L. Kennedy	Nominated by the Taoiseach	Fianna Fáil	
William Magennis	Nominated by the Taoiseach	Independent	Died on 30 March 1946
Liam Ó Buachalla	Nominated by the Taoiseach	Fianna Fáil	
Pádraic Ó Máille	Nominated by the Taoiseach	Fianna Fáil	Died on 19 January 1946
Pádraig Ó Siochfhradha	Nominated by the Taoiseach	Independent	Nominated on 22 February 1946, replacing Pádraic Ó Máille
Edward Pakenham	Nominated by the Taoiseach	Independent	Nominated on 7 November 1946, replacing William Magennis
Margaret Mary Pearse	Nominated by the Taoiseach	Fianna Fáil	
Matthew Stafford	Nominated by the Taoiseach	Fianna Fáil	

== Changes ==
Date	Panel	Loss	Gain	Note
25 October 1944	Industrial and Commercial Panel	Independent		Thomas Condon disqualified by virtue of his membership of the Irish Tourist Board
7 March 1945	Industrial and Commercial Panel		Independent	Frederick Summerfield elected to replace Thomas Condon
19 January 1946	Nominated by the Taoiseach	Fianna Fáil		Death of Pádraic Ó Máille
22 February 1946	Nominated by the Taoiseach		Independent	Pádraig Ó Siochfhradha nominated to replace Pádraic Ó Máille
30 March 1946	Nominated by the Taoiseach	Independent		Death of William Magennis
22 May 1946	Labour Panel	Independent		Death of John Thomas Keane
24 July 1946	Labour Panel		Independent	Frederick Hawkins elected at a by-election to replace John Thomas Keane
7 November 1946	Nominated by the Taoiseach		Independent	Edward Pakenham nominated to replace William Magennis
11 June 1947	Dublin University	Independent		T. C. Kingsmill Moore appointed as a judge of the High Court
31 July 1947	Cultural and Educational Panel	Fine Gael		Resignation of James Parkinson
18 September 1947	Labour Panel	Labour		Death of Thomas Kennedy
22 November 1947	Dublin University		Independent	Joseph Warwick Bigger elected at a by-election to replace T. C. Kingsmill Moore
4 February 1948	Agricultural Panel	Fine Gael		Gerard Sweetman elected to the 13th Dáil at the 1948 general election
4 February 1948	Industrial and Commercial Panel	Fine Gael		David Madden elected to the 13th Dáil at the 1948 general election
