= 6th Seanad =

Members of the Seanad from 1948 to 1951

←	5th Seanad	7th Seanad	→

Overview
- Legislative body: Seanad Éireann
- Jurisdiction: Ireland
- Meeting place: Leinster House
- Term: 21 April 1948 – 25 July 1951
- Government: 5th government of Ireland
- Members: 60
- Cathaoirleach: Timothy O'Donovan (FG)
- Leas-Chathaoirleach: Seán Goulding (FF)
- Leader of the Seanad: Michael Hayes (FG)

The 6th Seanad was in office from 1948 to 1951. An election to Seanad Éireann, the Senate of the Oireachtas (Irish parliament), followed the 1948 general election to the 13th Dáil. The senators served until the close of poll for the 7th Seanad in 1951.

== Cathaoirleach ==
On 21 April 1948, Timothy O'Donovan (FG), the outgoing Leas-Cathaoirleach, was proposed by Michael Hayes (FG) and seconded by Luke Duffy (Lab) for the position of Cathaoirleach. He was elected unopposed.

On 2 June 1948, Seán Goulding (FF), Cathaoirleach of the 5th Seanad, was proposed by William Quirke (FF) and seconded by Helena Concannon (FF) for the position of Leas-Chathaoirleach. He was elected unopposed.

== Composition of the 6th Seanad ==
There are a total of 60 seats in the Seanad: 43 were elected on five vocational panels, 6 were elected from two university constituencies and 11 were nominated by the Taoiseach.

The following table shows the composition by party when the 6th Seanad first met on 21 April 1948.

Origin Party	Vocational panels					NUI	DU	Nominated	Total
Origin Party	Admin	Agri	Cult & Educ	Ind & Comm	Labour	NUI	DU	Nominated	Total
Fianna Fáil	3	3	2	2	2	1	0	0	13
Fine Gael	1	2	2	3	1	1	0	2	12
Labour Party	0	2	1	1	2	0	0	2	8
Clann na Talmhan	1	1	0	0	1	0	0	0	3
Clann na Poblachta	0	0	0	0	0	0	0	2	2
Independent	2	3	0	3	5	1	3	5	22
Total	7	11	5	9	11	3	3	11	60

== List of senators ==
- Note: The entries for Senators who were elected or appointed to fill vacancies are shown in italics

Name	Panel	Party	Notes
John Finan	Administrative Panel	Clann na Talmhan	Elected to 14th Dáil at the general election on 30 May 1951
Patrick Fitzsimons	Administrative Panel	Independent	
Seán Goulding	Administrative Panel	Fianna Fáil	
Michael Hearne	Administrative Panel	Fianna Fáil	
James McGee	Administrative Panel	Independent	
Margaret Mary Pearse	Administrative Panel	Fianna Fáil	
Jeremiah Ryan	Administrative Panel	Fine Gael	
Patrick Baxter	Agricultural Panel	Clann na Talmhan	
Robert Malachy Burke	Agricultural Panel	Labour	Resigned on 6 December 1950
John Counihan	Agricultural Panel	Independent	
Seán Gibbons	Agricultural Panel	Fianna Fáil	
William O'Callaghan	Agricultural Panel	Fine Gael	
Timothy O'Donovan	Agricultural Panel	Fine Gael	
Martin O'Dwyer	Agricultural Panel	Independent	
Patrick O'Reilly	Agricultural Panel	Fianna Fáil	
Martin Quinn	Agricultural Panel	Independent	
William Quirke	Agricultural Panel	Fianna Fáil	
James Tunney	Agricultural Panel	Labour	
Michael Hayes	Cultural and Educational Panel	Fine Gael	
Cecil Lavery	Cultural and Educational Panel	Fine Gael	Appointed as a judge of the Supreme Court on 21 April 1950
Frank Loughman	Cultural and Educational Panel	Fianna Fáil	
Liam Ó Buachalla	Cultural and Educational Panel	Fianna Fáil	
Thomas J. O'Connell	Cultural and Educational Panel	Labour	
Joseph Brennan	Industrial and Commercial Panel	Independent	Died on 1 February 1950
Denis Burke	Industrial and Commercial Panel	Fine Gael	
Andrew Clarkin	Industrial and Commercial Panel	Fianna Fáil	
James Crosbie	Industrial and Commercial Panel	Fine Gael	
Mary Davidson	Industrial and Commercial Panel	Labour	Elected to Seanad at a by-election on 16 June 1950, succeeding Luke Duffy
Henry Morgan Dockrell	Industrial and Commercial Panel	Fine Gael	
Luke Duffy	Industrial and Commercial Panel	Labour	Resigned on 22 June 1949
T. V. Honan	Industrial and Commercial Panel	Fianna Fáil	
Peter Lynch	Industrial and Commercial Panel	Independent	
Frederick Summerfield	Industrial and Commercial Panel	Independent	
Richard Anthony	Labour Panel	Independent	
John Butler	Labour Panel	Fine Gael	
Seán Campbell	Labour Panel	Labour	Died on 27 February 1950
Michael Colgan	Labour Panel	Independent	
Andrew Fogarty	Labour Panel	Fianna Fáil	
Frederick Hawkins	Labour Panel	Independent	
Seán Hayes	Labour Panel	Fianna Fáil	
John Meighan	Labour Panel	Clann na Talmhan	
J. T. O'Farrell	Labour Panel	Labour	Resigned on 31 May 1950
Seán Ruane	Labour Panel	Independent	
Michael Smyth	Labour Panel	Independent	
Henry Barniville	National University of Ireland	Fine Gael	
Helena Concannon	National University of Ireland	Fianna Fáil	
George O'Brien	National University of Ireland	Independent	
Joseph Warwick Bigger	Dublin University	Independent	
William Fearon	Dublin University	Independent	
William Bedell Stanford	Dublin University	Independent	
George C. Bennett	Nominated by the Taoiseach	Fine Gael	
Eleanor Howard	Nominated by the Taoiseach	Labour	
James G. Douglas	Nominated by the Taoiseach	Independent	
Denis Ireland	Nominated by the Taoiseach	Clann na Poblachta	
Patrick McCartan	Nominated by the Taoiseach	Clann na Poblachta	
James J. McCrea	Nominated by the Taoiseach	Labour	
Edward McGuire	Nominated by the Taoiseach	Independent	
Séamus O'Farrell	Nominated by the Taoiseach	Independent	
Edward Richards-Orpen	Nominated by the Taoiseach	Independent	
Edmund Sweetman	Nominated by the Taoiseach	Fine Gael	
Patrick Woulfe	Nominated by the Taoiseach	Independent	

== Changes ==
Date	Panel	Loss	Gain	Note
22 June 1949	Industrial and Commercial Panel	Labour		Resignation of Luke Duffy on his appointment to the board of the Industrial Development Authority
1 February 1950	Industrial and Commercial Panel	Independent		Death of Joseph Brennan
27 February 1950	Labour Panel	Labour		Death of Seán Campbell
21 April 1950	Cultural and Educational Panel	Fine Gael		Cecil Lavery appointed as a judge of the Supreme Court
31 May 1950	Labour Panel	Labour		Resignation of J. T. O'Farrell
16 June 1950	Industrial and Commercial Panel		Labour	Mary Davidson elected at a by-election to succeed Luke Duffy
6 December 1950	Agricultural Panel	Labour		Resignation of Robert Malachy Burke
30 May 1951	Administrative Panel	Clann na Talmhan		John Finan elected to the 14th Dáil at the 1951 general election
