= Ó Siochfhradha =

Ó Siochfhradha is an Irish surname. It may refer to:

- Mícheál Ó Siochfhradha (1900–1986), Irish language writer and storyteller
- Pádraig Ó Siochfhradha (1883–1964), activist, writer (under the pen name An Seabhac) and senator
