= Attorney General Condon =

Attorney General Condon may refer to:

- Charlie Condon (born c. 1953), Attorney General of South Carolina
- Colm Condon (1921–2008), Attorney General of Ireland
