= By-elections in the Republic of Ireland =

This can refer to:

- List of Dáil by-elections
- List of Seanad by-elections
