= Thomas Condon (disambiguation) =

Thomas Condon (1822–1907) was an Irish-American minister, geologist, and paleontologist.

Thomas Condon is also the name of:

- Thomas Condon (Irish nationalist politician) (1850–1943), politician of East Tipperary
- Thomas Condon (senator) (1883–1963), Irish senator and local politician of Meath County
- Tom Condon, American football agent and former player
- Tom Condon (hurler), Irish hurler
