= Henry Guinness (disambiguation) =

Henry Guinness (1858–1945) was an Irish engineer, banker and politician.

Henry Guinness may also refer to:

- Henry Eustace Guinness (1897–1972), Irish banker and politician, member of the 8th Seanad Éireann
- Henry Grattan Guinness (1835–1910), Irish Protestant Christian preacher and author

== See also ==
- Guinness family
