= List of members of the Oireachtas who died in office =

There are two lists of members of the Oireachtas who died in office, namely:

- List of members of Seanad Éireann who died in office, for the upper house
- List of members of Dáil Éireann who died in office, for the lower house
