= Paddy Dunne (politician) =

Irish politician (1928–2006)

Senator
- In office 8 October 1981 – 13 May 1982
- Constituency: Nominated by the Taoiseach

Lord Mayor of Dublin
- In office 1975–1976
- Preceded by: James O'Keeffe
- Succeeded by: Jim Mitchell

Personal details
- Born: 3 November 1928 Dublin, Ireland
- Died: 20 July 2006 (aged 77) Dublin, Ireland
- Party: Labour Party
- Spouse: Marie Quinn
- Children: 4

Patrick Dunne (3 November 1928 – 20 July 2006) was a Labour Party politician from Dublin in Ireland. He was Lord Mayor of Dublin from 1975 to 1976, and a senator from 1981 to 1982.

A long-serving member of Dublin Corporation, Dunne stood unsuccessfully as a Labour candidate for Dáil Éireann at six successive general elections, but never won a seat. He contested Dublin North-East in 1965, 1969, and 1973, Dublin Artane in 1977, and Dublin North-West in the 1981 and February 1982 general elections.

After his 1981 defeat, he was nominated by the Taoiseach, Garret FitzGerald to the 15th Seanad, where he served until the election of the 16th Seanad in 1982. Dunne was one of three Labour nominees who were nominated with the intention that, supported by their senate salaries, they would devote their energies to strengthening the organisation and finances of the Labour Party. The choice of Dunne was seen as a settling of old scores with the party; Dunne was an ally of the Labour leader Michael O'Leary, and his senate seat was expected to strengthen Dunne's position against Brendan Halligan, his running-mate in Dublin North-West and an opponent of O'Leary's strategy of entering coalition with Fine Gael. Halligan did not stand in February 1982, but Dunne was beaten to the 4th seat in Dublin North-West by Proinsias De Rossa of Sinn Féin the Workers Party.

He died on 20 July 2006.

Civic offices
Preceded by James O'Keeffe	Lord Mayor of Dublin; 1975–1976	Succeeded by Jim Mitchell
