= James J. McCrea =

Irish politician (died 1969)

Senator
- In office 22 July 1954 – 22 May 1957
- Constituency: Agricultural Panel
- In office 14 August 1951 – 22 July 1954
- Constituency: Administrative Panel
- In office 21 April 1948 – 14 August 1951
- Constituency: Nominated by the Taoiseach

Personal details
- Born: County Wicklow, Ireland
- Died: 31 January 1969
- Party: Labour Party

James J. McCrea (died 31 January 1969) was an Irish politician, farmer and businessman. He was a Labour Party member of Seanad Éireann from 1948 to 1957. He was nominated by the Taoiseach to the 6th Seanad in 1948. He was elected to 7th Seanad in 1951 by the Administrative Panel, and to the 8th Seanad in 1954 by the Agricultural Panel. He did not contest the 1957 Seanad election.

He stood unsuccessfully for Dáil Éireann on two occasions. He stood as a Labour Party candidate for the Wicklow constituency; at the 1948 general election, and at the June 1953 by-election.
