= John Douglas (Irish politician) =

Irish politician and businessman (1912–1982)

Senator
- In office 1 October 1954 – 22 May 1957
- Constituency: Nominated by the Taoiseach

Personal details
- Born: 29 April 1912 Dublin, Ireland
- Died: 1982 (aged 69–70)
- Party: Independent
- Spouse: Hazel Malcolm (m. 1941)
- Children: 3
- Parent: James G. Douglas (father)

John Harold Douglas (29 April 1912 – 1982) was an Irish politician and an independent member of Seanad Éireann. He was nominated by the Taoiseach to the 8th Seanad on 1 October 1954, replacing his deceased father James G. Douglas.

Douglas was a Quaker like his father, and succeeded him as managing director of the family linen and clothing companies. On 2 September 1941, he married Hazel Malcolm (c.1915–8 September 2009); they had three children.
