= Séamus O'Farrell =

Irish politician (died 1973)

Senator
- In office 21 April 1948 – 14 August 1951
- Constituency: Nominated by the Taoiseach

Personal details
- Died: 9 December 1973
- Party: Independent

Séamus O'Farrell (died 9 December 1973) was an Irish independent politician and journalist. He was a member of Seanad Éireann from 1948 to 1951. He was nominated by the Taoiseach to the 6th Seanad in 1948. He lost his seat the 1951 Seanad election.
