= Patrick Woulfe =

Irish politician

Senator
- In office 21 April 1948 – 14 August 1951
- Constituency: Nominated by the Taoiseach

Personal details
- Party: Independent

Patrick Woulfe was an Irish independent politician and solicitor. He was a member of Seanad Éireann from 1948 to 1951. He was nominated by the Taoiseach to the 6th Seanad in 1948. He did not contest the 1951 Seanad election.
