= Pádraig Ághas =

Irish politician and schoolteacher (1885–1966)

Senator
- In office 14 August 1951 – 22 July 1954
- Constituency: Labour Panel

Personal details
- Born: Patrick Ashe; 28 April 1885; County Kerry, Ireland
- Died: 22 December 1966 (aged 81); County Galway, Ireland
- Political party: Independent
- Spouse: Helen Sullivan (m. 1916)

Pádraig Ághas (born Patrick Ashe; 28 April 1885 – 22 December 1966) was an Irish schoolteacher, writer and independent politician.

Ághas was born in Lispole, County Kerry, the son of Maitiú Ághas, a farmer, and his wife Máire Ní Shúilleabháin. He was a cousin of Thomas Ashe, a fellow Gaelic enthusiast. Pádraig was educated at the local Irish school in Lispole, where the Gaelic language had returned to the curriculum. His interest in the language was furthered during his time at the Institute of Education in Dingle (1900–1904).

From 1905 to 1910, he was an Irish teacher in Lismore, County Waterford and at De La Salle College Waterford from 1910 to 1912. He then taught in Doonbeg, County Clare, from 1912 to 1950. He was then encouraged to run for the Seanad Éireann by his cousin, and was elected to the 7th Seanad in 1951 by the Labour Panel. He served from 1951 to 1954. He did not contest the 1954 Seanad election.

Between 1919 and 1932, he published a number of short stories, poems and essays in Irish in various journals, including An Scuab, Misneach, Irish Fun, Fáinne an Lae and An Claidheamh Soluis. He also wrote a play for children, Sgéalta scoile.

He married Helen Sullivan, a fellow schoolteacher, in 1916. Late in life, he and his wife moved to Oranmore, County Galway, where he died in 1966. He was buried in Doonbeg.
