= Máire Ní Scolaí =

Irish traditional singer (1909–1985)

- Born: Mary Scully; 24 May 1909; Dublin, Ireland
- Died: 28 June 1985 (aged 76)
- Resting place: Galway
- Spouse: Liam Ó Buachalla

Máire Ní Scolaí (24 May 1909 – 28 June 1985) was an Irish traditional singer.

== Life ==
Máire Ní Scolaí was born on 24 May 1909 in Dublin. She was the daughter of Michael Scully, a commercial traveller and Mary Scully (née Kavanagh). She attended the Central Model Schools, where she learnt Irish through the pilot Irish language courses. She studied Irish further at Ring College, County Waterford. She moved to Galway with her sister Mona as a young adult, and began teaching Irish singing and dancing. With the Irish language theatre, An Taibhdhearc, Ní Scolaí played a number of leading roles. In Micheál Mac Liammóir's 1928 production of Diarmaid agus Gráinne, she played Gráinne.

Her interpretation of traditional Irish songs gained her fame, and she sang many times on 2RN as well as radio in France, Italy, the United States and the United Kingdom. Ní Scolaí trained as a mezzo-soprano and licentiate of the Trinity College of Music, London, she was noted as one of the few people who combined classical music with sean-nós singing successfully. She won awards at feiseanna such as Feis Chonnacht and Feis Shligigh, later becoming a judge. She was also an award winner at Aonach Tailteann, as well at the Welsh Eisteddfod, the Scottish mod, the Manx Tynwald, and the Breton Bretagne celebrations. She performed at London's Covent Garden and Queen's Hall. She travelled around Gaeltacht areas in Ireland to collect and save songs that may have otherwise have been lost. The traditional singers she collected from included Cáit Uí Chonláin in Spiddal and Labhras "Binn" Ó Cadhla. His Master's Voice recorded and released her performances of Seacht ndolas na Maighduine Mhuire, Caoineadh na dtrí Muire, and Eibhlín a Rún.

On 9 September 1931 she married Liam Ó Buachalla at University Church, St Stephen's Green, Dublin. She died on 28 June 1985, and is buried in Galway.
