= Martin Quinn (senator) =

Irish politician

Senator
- In office 21 April 1948 – 14 August 1951
- Constituency: Agricultural Panel

Personal details
- Party: Independent

Martin Quinn was an Irish politician. He was an independent member of Seanad Éireann from 1948 to 1951. He was elected to the 6th Seanad in 1948 by the Agricultural Panel. He lost his seat at the 1951 Seanad election.
