= Colm Condon =

Irish barrister and Attorney General

Attorney General of Ireland
- In office 16 March 1965 – 14 March 1973
- Taoiseach: Seán Lemass; Jack Lynch
- Preceded by: Aindrias Ó Caoimh
- Succeeded by: Declan Costello

Personal details
- Born: 16 July 1921 Ashbourne, County Meath, Ireland
- Died: 9 August 2008 (aged 87) Sandymount, Dublin, Ireland
- Party: Fianna Fáil
- Spouse: Stephanie Power
- Children: 4
- Parent: Thomas Condon (father)
- Education: University College Dublin

Colm Patrick Condon (16 July 1921 – 9 August 2008) was an Irish barrister who served as Attorney General of Ireland from 1965 to 1973.

Condon served in office as Attorney General of Ireland during the beginning of the Troubles in Northern Ireland in the late 1960s.

He was born in Ashbourne, County Meath, the third child of Thomas Condon, an accountant and Irish Republican Army (IRA) activist, who had taken part in the 1916 Easter Rising. His mother was Margaret McGuire, a teacher in Ashbourne. Thomas Condon was also briefly a Senator representing Fianna Fáil as well as having been a member of Meath County Council.

Condon was educated at Terenure College in Dublin and subsequently at University College Dublin. He practised cases including those involving defamation and personal injury.

Condon was called to the Bar in 1944, and became a senior counsel in 1959. He was appointed as Attorney General of Ireland, serving under Taoiseach Seán Lemass. He remained in office under Lemass's successor, Jack Lynch. He argued on behalf of the State during the 1970 Arms Trial which involved future Taoiseach Charles Haughey.

In 1972, he helped draft legislation that set up the Special Criminal Court.

In 1997, Condon appeared before the Moriarty Tribunal in which he sided with Haughey challenging the powers of the tribunal.

Condon was married twice. He had two sons and two daughters by his first marriage.

Legal offices
Preceded by Aindrias Ó Caoimh	Attorney General of Ireland; 1965–1973	Succeeded by Declan Costello
