= Seán Hartney =

Irish politician (1902–1974)

Senator
- In office 14 August 1951 – 22 May 1957
- Constituency: Industrial and Commercial Panel

Personal details
- Born: 1902 County Limerick, Ireland
- Died: 11 May 1974 (aged 71–72)
- Party: Fianna Fáil

Seán Hartney (1902 – 11 May 1974) was an Irish Fianna Fáil politician. He was a member of Seanad Éireann from 1951 to 1957. He was elected to the 7th Seanad in 1951 by the Industrial and Commercial Panel. He was re-elected at the 1954 Seanad election but lost his seat at the 1957 Seanad election.

He had previously stood unsuccessfully for Dáil Éireann as a Fianna Fáil candidate for the Limerick constituency at the 1943 general election.
