= T. C. Kingsmill Moore =

Irish judge, politician and author (1893–1979)

Judge of the Supreme Court
- In office 14 March 1951 – 6 December 1966
- Nominated by: Government of Ireland
- Appointed by: Seán T. O'Kelly

Judge of the High Court
- In office 7 June 1947 – 14 March 1951
- Nominated by: Government of Ireland
- Appointed by: Seán T. O'Kelly

Senator
- In office 8 September 1943 – 7 June 1947
- Constituency: Dublin University

Personal details
- Born: 16 March 1893 Dublin, Ireland
- Died: 21 January 1979 (aged 85) Dublin, Ireland
- Party: Independent
- Spouse: Beatrice McNie (m. 1926)
- Children: 2
- Education: Trinity College Dublin; King's Inns

Theodore Conyngham Kingsmill Moore (16 March 1893 – 21 January 1979) was an Irish judge, politician, author and barrister who served as a Judge of the Supreme Court from 1951 to 1966, a Judge of the High Court from 1947 to 1951 and a Senator for the Dublin University from 1943 to 1947.

Kingsmill Moore was born in Dublin in 1893 to Canon Henry Kingsmill Moore, Principal of the Church of Ireland College of Education, and Constance Turpin. He was educated at Marlborough College, Wiltshire, and Trinity College Dublin. While he was Auditor of the College Historical Society, W. B. Yeats spoke at the inaugural meeting of his session. Moore served in the Royal Flying Corps from 1917 to 1918, and was called to the Irish Bar in 1918, to the Inner Bar in 1934, and became a bencher of King's Inns in 1941.

He was also an author of highly regarded books on fly fishing, Kingsmill Moore was elected for the Dublin University constituency as an independent member of Seanad Éireann in the 4th Seanad from 1943 to 1944 and to the 5th Seanad from 1944 to 1948. He resigned from the Seanad in June 1947 on his appointment as a judge of the Irish High Court.

He was a High Court judge from 1947 to 1951, and of the Supreme Court of Ireland from 1951 to 1966.

A Kingsmill Moore Memorial Prize is given to students of Law at Trinity College Dublin scoring the highest marks of the first and second divisions.
