= Mal O'Hara =

Northern Irish politician (born 1979)

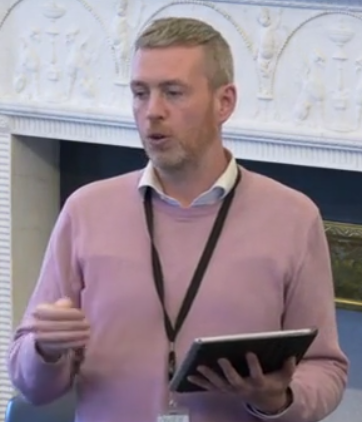
- O'Hara in 2024

Leader of Green Party Northern Ireland
- Incumbent
- Assumed office 15 August 2022
- Deputy: Lesley Veronica
- Preceded by: Clare Bailey

Senator
- In office 8 April 2024 – 31 January 2025
- Constituency: Administrative Panel

Deputy Leader of Green Party Northern Ireland
- In office 9 March 2019 – 15 August 2022
- Leader: Clare Bailey
- Preceded by: Tanya Jones
- Succeeded by: Lesley Veronica

Leader of the Green Party on Belfast City Council
- In office 7 May 2019 – 18 May 2023
- Leader: Clare Bailey; Himself
- Preceded by: Georgina Milne
- Succeeded by: Brian Smyth

Member of Belfast City Council
- In office 7 May 2019 – 18 May 2023
- Preceded by: David Browne
- Succeeded by: Brónach Anglin
- Constituency: Castle

Personal details
- Born: 28 July 1979 (age 47) Belfast, Northern Ireland
- Party: Green Party
- Education: University of Central England in Birmingham

Malachai O'Hara (born 28 July 1979) is a Northern Irish politician, activist and community worker who has been the leader of the Green Party Northern Ireland since August 2022, having previously served as deputy leader from 2019 to 2022. O'Hara was a Belfast City Councillor for the Castle electoral area from 2019, until 2023. In 2024, he was elected unopposed to Seanad Éireann, in a by-election to the Administrative Panel.

== Early life ==
O'Hara was born in North Belfast. He attended St Malachy's College and was a classmate of John Finucane who also later entered politics. The same year the Good Friday Agreement was signed, he then attended the University of Central England in Birmingham. Before entering politics, O'Hara worked as a community worker in loyalist areas, delivered European Union peace funding programmes and managed health initiatives for the Rainbow Project, Ireland's biggest LGBT organisation. While working for the Rainbow Project, he was vice-chair of the Equal Marriage Campaign, contributing to the legalisation of same-sex marriage in Northern Ireland.

O'Hara is the founder of Alternative Queer Ulster, an evening event that brings LGBTQ people into the Northern Ireland Assembly, a place often considered "a cold house to the LGBTQ community". During the first wave of the COVID-19 pandemic, O'Hara led a group of over 70 volunteers who set up a cross community soup-kitchen to deliver over 17,000 meals to vulnerable people across North and West Belfast.

== Political career ==
O'Hara joined the Green Party in 2014.

He was the Green Party candidate for Belfast North at the 2016 Northern Ireland Assembly election, where he was eliminated on the seventh count with 796 first preference votes (2.18%).

O'Hara tried again from Belfast North at the 2017 Assembly election, where he received 711 first preference votes, a 1.7% share of the vote.

At the 2017 general election, O'Hara contested Belfast North, where he finished fifth with 644 votes (1.4%), losing his deposit.

He was elected to Belfast City Council in 2019 for the Castle area, in an election where the Greens quadrupled their seats on the council, moving from one seat to four. O'Hara became the first Green Party councillor to be elected in North Belfast. During his term of office, he was one of the few openly LGBTQ+ elected members on the council.

On the council, O'Hara was a prominent campaigner for clean air, rent controls and climate action. He has called for a citizens' assembly to examine if drugs should be legalised in Northern Ireland, citing increasing drug deaths as evidence that Northern Ireland's current approach is "obviously not working."

He was a candidate in Belfast North at the 2022 Northern Ireland Assembly election, receiving 1446 first preference votes, thereby increasing his share of the vote to 3.1%.

O'Hara became the leader of the Green Party Northern Ireland on 15 August 2022, following a leadership election in which he was the only candidate. He was the first openly gay leader of a major party in Northern Ireland.

At the 2023 Northern Ireland local elections, O'Hara lost his seat.

In March 2024, O'Hara was announced as the Green Party candidate at the 2024 Seanad by-election and was elected unopposed. He took his seat on 8 April 2024.

O'Hara contested Belfast North at the 2024 general election. He received 3% of the vote against the incumbent MP, Sinn Féin's John Finucane.

He did not contest the 2025 Seanad election.
