= Mícheál Ó Siochfhradha =

Irish writer and teacher (1900–1986)

Mícheál Ó Siochfhradha (Irish pronunciation: [mʲiːˈçaːl̪ˠ oː ʃʊˈxɾˠuː]; 1900–1986) and Pádraig (An Seabhac) Ó Siochfhradha were brothers who were writers, teachers and Irish language storytellers, from Dingle, County Kerry, Ireland.

Mícheál Ó Siochfhradha wrote a number of comic short stories set in the Gaeltacht, notably, An Corp ('The Body'), which is part of the national curriculum's Irish course at Junior Certificate level. He trained as a teacher before becoming an inspector and retired as Chief Inspector in 1965. He was a founding member of An Comhar Drámaíochta Theatre Company, and edited two Irish dictionaries.

== Books ==
- Michaél Ó Siochfhradha, "Naln agus gealn"
- Mícheál Ó Siochfhradha, "Learner's English-Irish dictionary"
