= Seamus Bohan =

Irish politician

Senator
- In office 14 May 1956 – 22 May 1957
- Constituency: Industrial and Commercial Panel

Personal details
- Party: Independent

Seamus G. Bohan was an Irish independent politician. He was a member of Seanad Éireann from 1956 to 1957. He was elected to Seanad at a by-election on 14 May 1956, replacing Andrew Clarkin on the Industrial and Commercial Panel. He did not contest the 1957 Seanad election.

He stood unsuccessfully for Dáil Éireann as an independent candidate in the Dún Laoghaire and Rathdown constituency at the 1961 general election.
