= Henry Eustace Guinness =

Irish banker and politician (1897–1972)

Senator
- In office 22 July 1954 – 22 May 1957
- Constituency: Nominated by the Taoiseach

Personal details
- Born: 22 September 1897
- Died: 19 February 1972 (aged 74)
- Party: Independent
- Spouse: Beatrice Boothby (m. 1924)
- Children: 2
- Education: Winchester College

Henry Eustace Guinness (22 September 1897 – 19 February 1972) was an Irish banker and politician. He was educated at Winchester College, in Hampshire, England. He fought in World War I and gained the rank of Lieutenant in the service of the Royal Artillery. In addition, he was a partner and later of managing director of Guinness & Mahon bank.

He was an independent member of Seanad Éireann from 1954 to 1957. Guinness was nominated by the Taoiseach, John A. Costello in 1954 to the 8th Seanad. He did not contest the 1957 Seanad election.

In 1924, he married Beatrice Boothby, and they had two children.
