= John F. Cunningham =

Irish politician (died 1954)

Senator
- In office 25 February 1953 – 22 July 1954
- Constituency: National University

Personal details
- Died: 1954
- Party: Independent

John F. Cunningham (died 1954) was an Irish medical practitioner and an independent member of Seanad Éireann.

He was elected to the 7th Seanad on 25 February 1953 at a by-election for the National University constituency caused by the death of Helena Concannon. He lost his seat at the 1954 election.
