= Matthew Smith (Irish politician) =

Irish politician (died 1955)

Senator
- In office 22 July 1954 – 3 November 1955
- Constituency: Industrial and Commercial Panel

Personal details
- Died: 3 November 1955
- Party: Fianna Fáil

Matthew Smith (died 3 November 1955) was an Irish Fianna Fáil politician. He was a member of Seanad Éireann from 1954 until his death, having been elected to the 8th Seanad on the Industrial and Commercial Panel. James O'Keeffe was elected at a by-election on 14 May 1956 to replace him.

Smith had stood unsuccessfully for Dáil Éireann as a Fianna Fáil candidate for Dún Laoghaire and Rathdown at the 1951 general election.
