= William Woods (Irish politician) =

Irish politician (died 1966)

Senator
- In office 14 May 1956 – 22 May 1957
- Constituency: Administrative Panel

Personal details
- Died: October 1966
- Party: Independent

William Woods (died October 1966) was an Irish politician. He was an independent member of Seanad Éireann from 1956 to 1957. He was elected to the 8th Seanad on 14 May 1956 at a by-election for the Administrative Panel, replacing James McGee. He lost his seat at the 1957 Seanad election.
