= 2024 Seanad by-election =

By-election to the 26th Seanad

A by-election was due to be held for a vacancy in Seanad Éireann on Monday, 29 April 2024. The vacancy was caused by the resignation for health reasons of Sinn Féin's Niall Ó Donnghaile from the Administrative Panel on 22 January 2024. At the close of nominations on 22 March 2024, only one candidate had been nominated, and Mal O'Hara of the Green Party was deemed elected unopposed.

== Election system ==
When a vacancy occurs in the vocational panels, the electorate in by-elections consists of Oireachtas members only. For this election, it consisted of 160 TDs and 58 senators. To be nominated, a candidate must have the signature of nine members of the Oireachtas. Nominations closed on 22 March 2024 at 12 noon. Ballot papers were issued on 15 April 2024 and the polls closed at 11 a.m. on 29 April 2024.

All votes were cast by postal ballot, and counted using the single transferable vote. Under this system, voters can rank candidates in order of their preference, 1 as their first preference, 2 for second preference, and so on. Ballots are initially given a value of 1,000 to allow calculation of the quota (Droop quota) where all ballots are distributed in the case of a surplus.

== Process and dates ==
Niall Ó Donnghaile resigned on 22 January 2024, with a notice of the vacancy sent to the Minister for Housing, Local Government and Heritage on 7 March 2024. The minister is required to make a Seanad by-election order within 180 days after receiving a notice of a vacancy. On 8 March 2024, Minister Darragh O'Brien made an order for the by-election which set the following dates:

- 22 March 2024: close of receiving nominations;
- 8 April 2024: ruling on nominations;
- 15 April 2024: issuing of ballot papers;
- 29 April 2024, at 11 a.m.: close of poll.

== Campaign ==
Mal O'Hara was announced as the Green Party candidate on 12 March 2024. On 25 March 2024, it was reported that O'Hara would be unopposed as no other individual received the necessary ten nominations from members of the Oireachtas to contest the election. O'Hara took his seat on 8 April 2024.
