= John Donnelly Sheridan =

Irish politician (died 1963)

Senator
- In office 22 July 1954 – 5 April 1963
- Constituency: Agricultural Panel

Personal details
- Died: 5 April 1963
- Party: Independent

John Donnelly Sheridan (died 5 April 1963) was an Irish politician. He was an independent member of Seanad Éireann from 1954 to 1960. Sheridan was elected to the 8th Seanad in 1954 by the Agricultural Panel. He was re-elected at the 1957 and 1961 Seanad elections. He died in office in 1963, and Batt Donegan was elected to fill the vacancy.
