= Thomas Condon (senator) =

Irish politician (1883–1963)

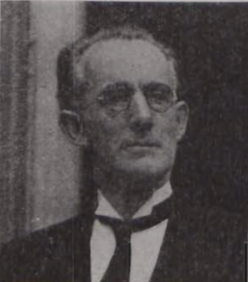
- Condon in 1935

Senator
- In office 18 August 1944 – 25 October 1944
- Constituency: Industrial and Commercial Panel
- In office 27 April 1938 – 7 September 1938
- Constituency: Administrative Panel

Personal details
- Born: 16 May 1883 Athy, County Kildare, Ireland
- Died: 12 September 1963 (aged 80) Ashbourne, County Meath, Ireland
- Resting place: Killegland Cemetery, Ashbourne, County Meath, Ireland
- Party: Independent
- Spouse: Margaret McGuire
- Children: 8, including Colm
- Occupation: Accountant, civil servant

Thomas Condon (16 May 1883 – 12 September 1963) was an Irish independent politician.

== Background and family ==
Thomas Condon was born in Athy, County Kildare on 16 May 1883, the son of Thomas Condon, a Sergent in the Royal Irish Constabulary, and Helena Cunningham. He was brought up in Cappoquin, County Waterford, Ireland, he later moved to Clontarf, Dublin where he became a civil servant. He married Margaret McGuire a teacher from County Leitrim in 1912, with whom he had eight children, including Colm Condon, who went on to become a barrister, and Attorney General of Ireland. Thomas and Margaret later moved to Ashbourne, County Meath where they brought up their children. Thomas Condon was purportedly well educated, speaking fluently: Irish, Latin, and French, though little is known of his formal education. He died on 12 September 1963.

== 1916 Easter Rising ==
Condon was a member of the Irish Volunteers, who took part in the raid of the Royal Irish Constabulary barracks in Ashbourne, led by Thomas Ashe, in the Easter Rising of 1916, and was subsequently sent to HM Prison Wandsworth on 8 May 1916. It is also probable that he used his position as a British civil servant, to spy on the British administration, prior to the rebellion.

== Local politics ==
Thomas Condon was a Meath County Councillor for Ashbourne, and Cathaoirligh (chair) of Meath County Council from 1934 to 1936., Thomas Condon was also Eighteen times reelected as the chairman of the Council for County councils from 1936 to 1954.

== Irish tourist board ==
Thomas Condon was appointed as the President of the Irish Tourist board, upon its creation in 1939, and he was later appointed as the chairman of the executive and finance committee of the tourist board

== Seanad Éireann ==
He was a member of Seanad Éireann in 1938 and again in 1944. He was first elected to the 2nd Seanad in April 1938 by the Administrative Panel. He lost his seat in the August 1938 Seanad election. He was re-elected by the Industrial and Commercial Panel at the 1944 Seanad election. He was disqualified from the Seanad on 25 October 1944 by virtue of his membership of the Irish Tourist Board. He was replaced by Frederick Summerfield.
