= Denis Burke (Irish politician) =

Irish politician (1904–1971)

Senator
- In office 21 April 1948 – 14 December 1961
- Constituency: Industrial and Commercial Panel

Personal details
- Born: 1904
- Died: 25 July 1971 (aged 66–67)
- Party: Fine Gael

Denis Burke (1904 – 25 July 1971) was an Irish Fine Gael politician who served as a senator for 13 years. He was first elected in 1948 to the 6th Seanad, and held his seat until he stood down at the 1961 election.

Burke stood twice as a candidate for Dáil Éireann, in Tipperary South at the 1961 and 1965 general elections. He was unsuccessful on both occasions.
