= John Thomas Keane =

Irish politician (died 1946)

Senator
- In office 18 August 1944 – 22 May 1946
- Constituency: Labour Panel

Personal details
- Died: 22 May 1946
- Party: Independent

John Thomas Keane (died 22 May 1946) was an Irish politician. He was an independent member of Seanad Éireann from 1944 to 1946. He was elected to the 5th Seanad in 1944 to the Labour Panel. He died in office in 1946, and Frederick Hawkins was elected to fill the vacancy.
