= Administrative Panel =

Seanad Éireann constituency

- Seanad Éireann constituency

Current constituency
- Created: 1938
- Seats: 7
- Senators: Garret Ahearn (FG); Martin Conway (FG); Mark Daly (FF); Eileen Flynn (Ind); Fiona O'Loughlin (FF); Nicole Ryan (SF); Diarmuid Wilson (FF)

The Administrative Panel is one of five vocational panels which together elect 43 of the 60 members of Seanad Éireann, the senate of the Oireachtas (the legislature of Ireland). The Administrative Panel elects seven senators.

== Election ==
Article 18 of the Constitution of Ireland provides that 43 of the 60 senators are to be elected from five vocational panels. The Administrative Panel is defined in Article 18.7.1°(v) as "Public Administration and social services, including voluntary social activities". The Seanad returning officer maintains a list of nominating bodies for each of the five panels. Candidates may be nominated either by four members of the Oireachtas or by a nominating body. The electorate consists of city and county councillors and current members of the Oireachtas. As the Seanad election takes place after the election to the Dáil, the Oireachtas members are the members of the incoming Dáil and the outgoing Seanad. Seven senators are elected on the Administrative Panel, at least three of whom must have been nominated by Oireachtas members and at least three must have been nominated by nominating bodies.

== Senators ==
Senators for the Administrative Panel
Key to parties: CnaT = Clann na Talmhan; FF = Fianna Fáil; FG = Fine Gael; GP = Green; Lab = Labour; SF = Sinn Féin; Ind = Independent
Sen	Election	Senator (Party)	Senator (Party)	Senator (Party)	Senator (Party)	Senator (Party)	Senator (Party)	Senator (Party)
2nd	1938	Christopher Byrne (FF)	Thomas Condon (Ind)	John Newcome (Ind)	Margaret Mary Pearse (FF)	Thomas Ruane (FF)	Richard Mulcahy (FG)	Michael Hayes (FG)
3rd	1938	Christopher Byrne (FF)	James McGee (Note: Died on 19 January 1956) (Ind)	Denis Healy (FF)	Margaret Mary Pearse (FF)	Thomas Ruane (FF)	Desmond FitzGerald (FG)	Michael Hayes (FG)
4th	1943	Joseph Hannigan (Ind)	James McGee (Ind)	Denis Healy (FF)	Richard Walsh (FF)	Michael Hearne (FF)	Edward Monahan (FG)	Michael Hayes (FG)
5th	1944	Andrew Clarkin (FF)	James McGee (Ind)	Denis Healy (FF)	Seán Goulding (FF)	Michael Hearne (FF)	Thomas Ruane (FF)	Michael Hayes (FG)
6th	1948	Margaret Mary Pearse (FF)	James McGee (Ind)	Patrick Fitzsimons (Ind)	Seán Goulding (FF)	Michael Hearne (FF)	Jeremiah Ryan (FG)	John Finan (CnaT)
7th	1951	James J. McCrea (Lab)	James McGee (Ind)	Patrick Fitzsimons (Ind)	Thomas Ruane (FF)	Michael Hearne (FF)	Patrick Teehan (Note: Elected to the 16th Dáil at a by-election on 23 June 1960) (FF)	Michael J. O'Higgins (FG)
8th	1954	Louis Walsh (Ind)	James McGee (Ind)	Margaret Mary Pearse (FF)	Thomas Ruane (FF)	John L. O'Sullivan (FG)	Patrick Teehan (FF)	Gerry L'Estrange (FG)
8th	1956	Louis Walsh (Ind)	William Woods (Note: Elected to Seanad at a by-election on 14 May 1956, replacing James McGee) (Ind)	Margaret Mary Pearse (FF)	Thomas Ruane (FF)	John L. O'Sullivan (FG)	Patrick Teehan (FF)	Gerry L'Estrange (FG)
9th	1957	John O'Leary (Note: Died on 21 June 1959) (Lab)	Patrick Fitzsimons (Ind)	Patrick Connor (FG)	Thomas Ruane (FF)	John L. O'Sullivan (FG)	Patrick Teehan (FF)	Gerry L'Estrange (FG)
9th	1960	Gerard B. Dillon (Note: Elected to Seanad at a by-election on 1 November 1960, replacing Patrick Teehan) (FF)	Patrick Fitzsimons (Ind)	Patrick Connor (FG)	Thomas Ruane (FF)	John L. O'Sullivan (FG)	John J. Brennan (Note: Elected to Seanad at a by-election on 9 February 1960, replacing John O'Leary) (FF)	Gerry L'Estrange (FG)
10th	1961	Cornelius Desmond (Lab)	Patrick Fitzsimons (Ind)	Liam Ahern (FF)	Thomas Ruane (FF)	Seán Brady (FF)	Thomas J. Fitzpatrick (FG)	Gerry L'Estrange (FG)
11th	1965	Jack McQuillan (Lab)	Patrick Fitzsimons (Ind)	Liam Ahern (FF)	Kieran Egan (FF)	Patrick Teehan (FF)	Éamon Rooney (FG)	Patrick O'Reilly (FG)
12th	1969	Jack Garrett (Note: Died on 11 September 1977) (FF)	Patrick Fitzsimons (Ind)	Liam Ahern (FF)	Patrick Malone (Note: Elected to the 19th Dáil at a by-election on 14 April 1970) (FG)	Patrick Norton (FF)	Richard Belton (FG)	Patrick J. Reynolds (FG)
12th	1970	Jack Garrett (FF)	Patrick Fitzsimons (Ind)	Liam Ahern (FF)	Seán Keegan (Note: Elected to Seanad at a by-election on 16 June 1970, replacing Patrick Malone) (FF)	Patrick Norton (FF)	Richard Belton (FG)	Patrick J. Reynolds (FG)
13th	1973	Jack Garrett (FF)	Bernard McGlinchey (FF)	Seán Brosnan (Note: Elected to the 20th Dáil at a by-election on 13 November 1974) (FF)	Seán Keegan (FF)	Philip Burton (FG)	Andy O'Brien (FG)	Thomas Kilbride (FG)
13th	1975	Jack Garrett (FF)	Bernard McGlinchey (FF)	Micheál Prendergast (Note: Elected to Seanad at a by-election on 23 April 1975, replacing Seán Brosnan) (FG)	Seán Keegan (FF)	Philip Burton (FG)	Andy O'Brien (FG)	Thomas Kilbride (FG)
14th	1977	Jack Garrett (FF)	Micheál Cranitch (FF)	Tras Honan (FF)	Michael P. Kitt (FF)	Liam Burke (Note: Elected to 21st Dáil at a by-election on 6 November 1979) (FG)	Myles Staunton (FG)	Thomas Kilbride (FG)
14th	1977	Michael Donnelly (Note: Elected to Seanad at a by-election on 7 December 1977, following the death of Jack Garrett) (FF)	Micheál Cranitch (FF)	Tras Honan (FF)	Michael P. Kitt (FF)	Liam Burke (FG)	Myles Staunton (FG)	Thomas Kilbride (FG)
14th	1980	Michael Donnelly (FF)	Micheál Cranitch (FF)	Tras Honan (FF)	Michael P. Kitt (FF)	Jim Doolan (FF)	Myles Staunton (FG)	Thomas Kilbride (FG)
15th	1981	Flor O'Mahony (Lab)	Micheál Cranitch (FF)	Tras Honan (FF)	Jimmy Leonard (FF)	Patrick Kennedy (FG)	Myles Staunton (FG)	Katharine Bulbulia (FG)
16th	1982	Flor O'Mahony (Lab)	Micheál Cranitch (FF)	Tras Honan (FF)	Sean Conway (FF)	Billy Kenneally (FF)	Luke Belton (FG)	Katharine Bulbulia (FG)
17th	1983	Flor O'Mahony (Lab)	Michael Lynch (FF)	Tras Honan (FF)	Martin O'Donoghue (FF)	Patrick Kennedy (FG)	Luke Belton (FG)	Katharine Bulbulia (FG)
18th	1987	Michael Doherty (FF)	Seán Haughey (FF)	Tras Honan (FF)	Mary Wallace (FF)	Patrick Kennedy (FG)	Joe Doyle (FG)	Katharine Bulbulia (FG)
19th	1989	Joe Costello (Lab)	Seán Haughey (FF)	Tras Honan (FF)	Michael Finneran (FF)	Patrick Kennedy (FG)	Seán Doherty (FF)	Tom Raftery (FG)
20th	1993	Jan O'Sullivan (Lab)	Michael O'Kennedy (FF)	Dick Roche (FF)	Michael Finneran (FF)	Tom Enright (FG)	Louis Belton (FG)	Joe Doyle (FG)
21st	1997	Joe Costello (Lab)	Camillus Glynn (FF)	Tony Kett (Note: Died on 19 April 2009) (FF)	Michael Finneran (FF)	Fintan Coogan Jnr (FG)	Fergus O'Dowd (FG)	Joe Doyle (FG)
22nd	2002	Joanna Tuffy (Lab)	Camillus Glynn (FF)	Tony Kett (FF)	Diarmuid Wilson (FF)	Timmy Dooley (FF)	Joe McHugh (FG)	Frank Feighan (FG)
23rd	2007	Brendan Ryan (Lab)	Camillus Glynn (FF)	Tony Kett (FF)	Diarmuid Wilson (FF)	Mark Daly (FF)	Paschal Donohoe (FG)	Nicky McFadden (FG)
23rd	2009	Brendan Ryan (Lab)	Camillus Glynn (FF)	James Carroll (Note: Elected to Seanad on 26 November 2009, replacing Tony Kett) (FF)	Diarmuid Wilson (FF)	Mark Daly (FF)	Paschal Donohoe (FG)	Nicky McFadden (FG)
24th	2011	John Kelly (Lab)	Denis Landy (Lab)	Michael D'Arcy (FG)	Diarmuid Wilson (FF)	Mark Daly (FF)	Tom Sheahan (FG)	Martin Conway (FG)
25th	2016	Kevin Humphreys (Lab)	Niall Ó Donnghaile (SF)	John Dolan (Ind)	Diarmuid Wilson (FF)	Mark Daly (FF)	Maura Hopkins (FG)	Martin Conway (FG)
26th	2020	Rebecca Moynihan (Lab)	Niall Ó Donnghaile (SF)	Fiona O'Loughlin (FF)	Diarmuid Wilson (FF)	Mark Daly (FF)	Garret Ahearn (FG)	Martin Conway (FG)
26th	2024	Rebecca Moynihan (Lab)	Mal O'Hara (GP)	Fiona O'Loughlin (FF)	Diarmuid Wilson (FF)	Mark Daly (FF)	Garret Ahearn (FG)	Martin Conway (FG)
27th	2025	Eileen Flynn (Ind)	Nicole Ryan (SF)	Fiona O'Loughlin (FF)	Diarmuid Wilson (FF)	Mark Daly (FF)	Garret Ahearn (FG)	Martin Conway (FG)

Note: The columns in this table are used only for presentational purposes, and no significance should be attached to the order of columns.

== List of nominating bodies ==
The following bodies are on the register of nominating bodies maintained by the Seanad Returning Officer for the Administrative Panel.

- Association of Irish Local Government
- Local Authority Members’ Association
- Central Remedial Clinic
- Enable Ireland Disability Services Limited
- The Multiple Sclerosis Society of Ireland
- Irish Wheelchair Association
- Inclusion Ireland — National Association for People with an Intellectual Disability
- National Association for the Deaf
- The Irish Kidney Association Company CLG
- Irish Deaf Society — National Association of the Deaf
- Deaf Village Ireland
- Disability Federation of Ireland
- Irish Foster Care Association
- The Alzheimer Society of Ireland
- Co-operative Housing Ireland Society Ltd.
- Co-operative House
- Center for Independent Living Limited
- Carmichael House
- National Council for the Blind
- Threshold
- Care Alliance Ireland
- The Immigrant Council of Ireland
- Family Carers Ireland
- Irish Local Development Network CLG
- BeLonG To Youth Services
- LGBT Ireland (LGBT Support & Advocacy Ireland CLG)
