= Liam Ó Buachalla =

Irish politician (1899–1970)

Cathaoirleach of Seanad Éireann
- In office 22 May 1957 – 5 November 1969
- Preceded by: Patrick Baxter
- Succeeded by: Michael Yeats
- In office 14 August 1951 – 22 July 1954
- Preceded by: Timothy O'Donovan
- Succeeded by: Patrick Baxter

Senator
- In office 21 April 1948 – 5 November 1969
- Constituency: Cultural and Educational Panel
- In office 7 October 1939 – 21 April 1948
- Constituency: Nominated by the Taoiseach

Personal details
- Born: 10 April 1899 Dublin, Ireland
- Died: 15 October 1970 (aged 71) Drogheda, Ireland
- Party: Fianna Fáil
- Spouse: Máire Ní Scolaí (m. 1931)
- Education: University College Dublin; University College Galway

Liam Ó Buachalla (10 April 1899 – 15 October 1970) was a Fianna Fáil politician from Drogheda, County Louth, Ireland. He was active as a financial expert in the Irish War of Independence. He was a Senator from 1939 to 1969, and was twice elected as Cathaoirleach of Seanad Éireann.

He worked as a cooper at Guinness Brewery in Dublin, but studied in the evenings, taking a Bachelor of Commerce and a higher diploma in education from University College Dublin (UCD), and then a master's degree in economics from University College Galway.

A professor of Economics at UCG, Ó Buachalla was nominated by the Taoiseach Éamon de Valera to the 3rd Seanad in 1939, to fill the vacancy caused by the death of Colonel Maurice Moore. He was re-appointed to the 4th Seanad and to the 5th. After Fianna Fáil lost power at the 1948 general election, the new Fine Gael Taoiseach was unlikely to reappoint him, and he was elected to the 6th Seanad on the Cultural and Educational Panel. He was re-elected five times, until he stood down at the 1969 Seanad election.

He was Cathaoirleach (chair) of the Seanad from 1951 to 1954, and from 1957 to 1969, and also served as Leas-Chathaoirleach (deputy chair) from 1954 to 1957.

He lectured through Irish in Commerce and Economics from his appointment as part of the programme for the Gaelicization of Third Level under the 1929 Act. He was author of many textbooks amongst which were "Bunadhas na Tráchtála" (1944), "Bunadhas an Gheileagair", "Cúntais agus Cúntaisíocht" (1954), "Ard-Chúntaisíocht" (1959) and "Forás Teoiricí an Gheilleagair" (1968).

He was the founder of the highly successful "Scoltacha Éigse agus Seanchais" in the Conamara Gaeltacht.

His wife Máire Ní Scolaí was a notable singer of songs in Irish both seannós and common style and also an actress. She created the role of Gráinne in the Taibhdhearc 1928 première of Micheál Mac Liammóir's drama "Diarmuid agus Gráinne".

Oireachtas
Preceded by Timothy O'Donovan	Cathaoirleach of Seanad Éireann; 1951–1954	Succeeded by Patrick Baxter
Preceded by Patrick Baxter	Cathaoirleach of Seanad Éireann; 1957–1969	Succeeded by Michael Yeats
