= Frank J. Hugh O'Donnell =

Irish critic, playwright and politician (1894–1976)

Senator
- In office 22 July 1954 – 22 May 1957
- Constituency: Nominated by the Taoiseach
- In office 14 August 1951 – 22 July 1954
- In office 8 September 1943 – 18 August 1944
- Constituency: Industrial and Commercial Panel

Personal details
- Born: 4 April 1894 County Galway, Ireland
- Died: 4 November 1976 (aged 82)
- Party: Independent
- Spouse: Deirdre O'Donnell
- Children: 2

Frank J. Hugh O'Donnell (4 April 1894 – 4 November 1976) was an Irish critic, playwright and politician.

O'Donnell was born at Shop Street, Tuam, County Galway to John O'Donnell and his wife Delia (née Carr), but spent his childhood in Milltown, County Galway. O'Donnell was enrolled in Milltown National School in November 1902 aged eight and left in June 1909 aged fifteen. He and his brother Patrick O'Donnell worked in the family business in Tuam before moving to Dublin to work in the clothing industry. He was a published critic of music, literature and theatrical performances, and wrote a weekly letter in the Gael, a weekly paper. He was also a playwright, having some of his works staged at the Abbey Theatre.

His first play The Dawn Mist (1919) follows a Galway family, the Egans, who lose two brothers and an uncle in the 1916 Easter Rising. The play became very popular, however it was banned by the British authorities, earning the title of "Ireland's most proclaimed [banned] play".

In 1943 he became a member of Seanad Éireann on the Industrial and Commercial Panel where he promoted Irish arts and culture. He lost his seat at the 1944 Seanad election, but was re-elected at the 1951 election. He was nominated by the Taoiseach to the Seanad in 1954.

O'Donnell had two children with his second wife, Deirdre.

A collection of O'Donnell's papers and manuscripts dating from 1911 to 1974 is in the University of Delaware Library.

He bore almost the same name as a contemporary politician, Frank Hugh O'Donnell, also from County Galway.

== Select bibliography ==
- The Dawn Mist: A Play of the Rebellion, Gael Co-operative Society, 1919
- The Drifters, 1920
- Five minutes wait, Dublin, 1921
- Keeper of the Light, 1925
- Anti-Christ, 1925
- O'Flaherty's Star, 1925
- Futility
