= Industrial and Commercial Panel =

Seanad Éireann constituency

- Seanad Éireann constituency

Current constituency
- Created: 1938
- Seats: 9
- Senators: Frances Black (Ind); Ollie Crowe (FF); Aidan Davitt (FF); Mary Fitzpatrick (FF); Laura Harmon (Lab); Garret Kelleher (FG); Sharon Keogan (Ind); Conor Murphy (SF); Linda Nelson Murray (FG)

The Industrial and Commercial Panel is one of five vocational panels which together elect 43 of the 60 members of Seanad Éireann, the senate of the Oireachtas (the legislature of Ireland). The Industrial and Commercial Panel elects nine senators.

== Election ==
Article 18 of the Constitution of Ireland provides that 43 of the 60 senators are to be elected from five vocational panels. The Industrial and Commercial Panel is defined in Article 18.7.1°(v) as "Industry and Commerce, including banking, finance, accountancy, engineering and architecture". The Seanad returning officer maintains a list of nominating bodies for each of the five panels. Candidates may be nominated either by four members of the Oireachtas or by a nominating body. The electorate consists of city and county councillors and current members of the Oireachtas. As the Seanad election takes place after the election to the Dáil, the Oireachtas members are the members of the incoming Dáil and the outgoing Seanad. Nine senators are elected on the Industrial and Commercial Panel, at least three of whom must have been nominated by Oireachtas members and at least three must have been nominated by nominating bodies.

== Senators ==
Senators for the Industrial and Commercial Panel
Key to parties: FF = Fianna Fáil; FG = Fine Gael; Lab = Labour; PDs = Progressive Democrats; SF = Sinn Féin; Ind = Independent
Sen	Election	Senator (Party)	Senator (Party)	Senator (Party)	Senator (Party)	Senator (Party)	Senator (Party)	Senator (Party)	Senator (Party)	Senator (Party)
2nd	1938	James G. Douglas (Ind)	Michael Hearne (FF)	Linda Kearns MacWhinney (FF)	Daniel Corkery (FF)	James Crosbie (FG)	Cornelius Kennedy (FG)	John MacLoughlin (FG)	David Madden (FG)	Brian O'Rourke (FG)
3rd	1938	James G. Douglas (Ind)	Joseph Brennan (Ind)	Peter Trainor Kelly (Ind)	Daniel Corkery (FF)	Seán Goulding (FF)	Seán MacEllin (FF)	John MacLoughlin (FG)	David Madden (FG)	Martin Conlon (FG)
4th	1943	John Maguire (Ind)	Joseph Brennan (Ind)	Peter Trainor Kelly (Ind)	Daniel Corkery (FF)	Seán Goulding (FF)	Frank J. Hugh O'Donnell (Ind)	Frank O'Beirne (FF)	David Madden (FG)	James Crosbie (FG)
5th	1944	Luke Duffy (Note: Resigned on 22 June 1949.) (Lab)	James G. Douglas (Ind)	Peter Trainor Kelly (Ind)	Daniel Corkery (FF)	Thomas Condon (Note: Disqualified from the Seanad on 25 October 1944 by virtue of his membership of the Irish Tourist Board.) (FF)	Tadhg Crowley (FF)	Seán MacEllin (FF)	David Madden (FG)	James Crosbie (FG)
5th	1945	Luke Duffy (Lab)	James G. Douglas (Ind)	Peter Trainor Kelly (Ind)	Daniel Corkery (FF)	Frederick Summerfield (Note: Elected on 7 March 1945, replacing Thomas Condon.) (Ind)	Tadhg Crowley (FF)	Seán MacEllin (FF)	David Madden (FG)	James Crosbie (FG)
6th	1948	Luke Duffy (Lab)	Peter Lynch (Ind)	Joseph Brennan (Note: Died on 1 February 1950.) (Ind)	Andrew Clarkin (Note: Died on 23 November 1955.) (FF)	Frederick Summerfield (Ind)	T. V. Honan (FF)	Henry Morgan Dockrell (FG)	Denis Burke (FG)	James Crosbie (FG)
6th	1950	Mary Davidson (Note: Elected to Seanad at a by-election on 16 June 1950, replacing Joseph Brennan.) (Lab)	Peter Lynch (Ind)	(Vacant)	Andrew Clarkin (FF)	Frederick Summerfield (Ind)	T. V. Honan (FF)	Henry Morgan Dockrell (FG)	Denis Burke (FG)	James Crosbie (FG)
7th	1951	James G. Douglas (Ind)	Peter Lynch (Ind)	Edward McGuire (Ind)	Andrew Clarkin (FF)	Frederick Summerfield (Ind)	Jane Dowdall (FF)	Seán Hartney (FF)	Denis Burke (FG)	Frank J. Hugh O'Donnell (Ind)
8th	1954	Mary Davidson (Lab)	Peter Lynch (Ind)	Edward McGuire (Ind)	Andrew Clarkin (FF)	Matthew Smith (Note: Died on 3 November 1955.) (FF)	Jane Dowdall (FF)	Seán Hartney (FF)	Denis Burke (FG)	John Lynch (FG)
8th	1956	Mary Davidson (Lab)	Peter Lynch (Ind)	Edward McGuire (Ind)	Seamus Bohan (Note: Elected to Seanad at a by-election on 14 May 1956, replacing Andrew Clarkin.) (Ind)	James O'Keeffe (Note: Elected to Seanad at a by-election on 14 May 1956, replacing Matthew Smith.) (FG)	Jane Dowdall (FF)	Seán Hartney (FF)	Denis Burke (FG)	John Lynch (FG)
9th	1957	Mary Davidson (Lab)	Peter Lynch (Ind)	Edward McGuire (Ind)	Tadhg Crowley (FF)	James O'Keeffe (FG)	Jane Dowdall (FF)	Brian Lenihan Snr (FF)	Denis Burke (FG)	Joseph Roddy (FG)
10th	1961	Mary Davidson (Lab)	Thomas Flanagan (Ind)	Edward McGuire (Ind)	Eoin Ryan Snr (FF)	Gerald Boland (FF)	Bernard McGlinchey (FF)	Daniel Moloney (Note: Died on 26 June 1963.) (FF)	Patrick Lindsay (FG)	Joseph Quigley (FG)
10th	1963	Mary Davidson (Lab)	Thomas Flanagan (Ind)	Edward McGuire (Ind)	Eoin Ryan Snr (FF)	Gerald Boland (FF)	Bernard McGlinchey (FF)	John Costelloe (Note: Elected to Seanad at a by-election on 28 November 1963, replacing Daniel Moloney.) (FF)	Patrick Lindsay (FG)	Joseph Quigley (FG)
11th	1965	Mary Davidson (Lab)	Thomas Flanagan (Ind)	John J. Brennan (FF)	Eoin Ryan Snr (FF)	Dermot Honan (FF)	Bernard McGlinchey (FF)	John Conlan (FG)	Garret FitzGerald (FG)	Denis J. O'Sullivan (FG)
12th	1969	Eileen Desmond (Lab)	Ted Russell (Ind)	Ruairí Brugha (FF)	Eoin Ryan Snr (FF)	Dermot Honan (FF)	Bernard McGlinchey (FF)	James Dooge (FG)	Denis Farrelly (Note: Died on 27 December 1974.) (FG)	Alexis FitzGerald Snr (FG)
13th	1973	Michael Moynihan (Lab)	Ted Russell (Ind)	John J. Brennan (FF)	Eoin Ryan Snr (FF)	Fad Browne (FF)	Brian Lenihan Snr (FF)	James Dooge (FG)	Denis Farrelly (FG)	Alexis FitzGerald Snr (FG)
13th	1975	Michael Moynihan (Lab)	Ted Russell (Ind)	John J. Brennan (FF)	Eoin Ryan Snr (FF)	Fad Browne (FF)	Brian Lenihan Snr (FF)	James Dooge (FG)	Jack Daly (Note: Elected to Seanad at a by-election on 23 April 1975, replacing Denis Farrelly.) (FG)	Alexis FitzGerald Snr (FG)
14th	1977	Michael Moynihan (Lab)	Ruairí Brugha (FF)	Mick Lanigan (FF)	Eoin Ryan Snr (FF)	Liam Hyland (FF)	Desmond Governey (FG)	Michael Howard (FG)	Patrick J. Reynolds (FG)	Alexis FitzGerald Snr (FG)
15th	1981	Ruairi Quinn (Lab)	Seán Fallon (Note: Died on 4 July 1995.) (FF)	Mick Lanigan (FF)	Eoin Ryan Snr (FF)	Barry Cogan (FF)	Deirdre Bolger (FG)	Michael Howard (FG)	Patrick J. Reynolds (FG)	Alexis FitzGerald Jnr (FG)
16th	1982	Timmy Conway (Note: Joined the Progressive Democrats in 1986.) (Lab)	Seán Fallon (FF)	Mick Lanigan (FF)	Eoin Ryan Snr (FF)	Willie Farrell (FF)	Deirdre Bolger (FG)	Michael Howard (FG)	Patrick J. Reynolds (FG)	Jack Daly (Note: Died on 5 May 1988.) (FG)
17th	1983	Timmy Conway (Lab)	Seán Fallon (FF)	Mick Lanigan (FF)	Eoin Ryan Snr (FF)	Jack Fitzsimons (FF)	Alexis FitzGerald Jnr (FG)	Michael Howard (FG)	Patrick J. Reynolds (FG)	Jack Daly (FG)
18th	1987	Brian O'Shea (Lab)	Seán Fallon (FF)	Mick Lanigan (FF)	Eddie Bohan (FF)	Jack Fitzsimons (FF)	Willie Farrell (FF)	Phil Hogan (FG)	Gerry Reynolds (FG)	Jack Daly (FG)
18th	1988	Brian O'Shea (Lab)	Seán Fallon (FF)	Mick Lanigan (FF)	Eddie Bohan (FF)	Jack Fitzsimons (FF)	Willie Farrell (FF)	Phil Hogan (FG)	Gerry Reynolds (FG)	Tony Bromell (FF)
19th	1989	John Ryan (Lab)	Seán Fallon (FF)	Richard Conroy (FF)	Eddie Bohan (FF)	Denis Foley (FF)	Willie Farrell (FF)	Liam T. Cosgrave (FG)	Michael Howard (FG)	Myles Staunton (FG)
20th	1993	Ann Gallagher (Lab)	Seán Fallon (FF)	Mick Lanigan (FF)	Eddie Bohan (FF)	Cathy Honan (PDs)	Willie Farrell (FF)	Liam T. Cosgrave (FG)	Michael Howard (FG)	Gerry Reynolds (FG)
20th	1996	Ann Gallagher (Lab)	Sam McAughtry (Note: Elected to Seanad Éireann at by-election on 23 February 1996, replacing Seán Fallon.) (Ind)	Mick Lanigan (FF)	Eddie Bohan (FF)	Cathy Honan (PDs)	Willie Farrell (FF)	Liam T. Cosgrave (FG)	Michael Howard (FG)	Gerry Reynolds (FG)
21st	1997	Pat Gallagher (Note: Resigned from the Seanad on 12 October 1999.) (Lab)	Margaret Cox (Note: Fianna Fáil party whip was removed on 4 April 2007.) (FF)	Mick Lanigan (FF)	Eddie Bohan (FF)	Denis O'Donovan (FF)	Willie Farrell (FF)	Liam T. Cosgrave (FG)	Ernie Caffrey (FG)	Paul Coghlan (FG)
21st	2000	Jim Glennon (Note: Elected to the Seanad at a by-election on 2 June 2000, replacing Pat Gallagher.) (FF)	Margaret Cox (FF)	Mick Lanigan (FF)	Eddie Bohan (FF)	Denis O'Donovan (FF)	Willie Farrell (FF)	Liam T. Cosgrave (FG)	Ernie Caffrey (FG)	Paul Coghlan (FG)
22nd	2002	Derek McDowell (Lab)	Margaret Cox (FF)	Marc MacSharry (FF)	Eddie Bohan (FF)	Mary White (FF)	Kieran Phelan (Note: Died on 26 May 2010.) (FF)	James Bannon (FG)	Sheila Terry (FG)	Paul Coghlan (FG)
23rd	2007	Dominic Hannigan (Lab)	Larry Butler (Note: Resigned Fianna Fáil party whip 5 June 2010.) (FF)	Marc MacSharry (FF)	Denis O'Donovan (Note: Lost the Fianna Fáil party whip on 25 June 2010. Rejoined the Fianna Fáil parliamentary party on 19 October 2010.) (FF)	Mary White (FF)	Kieran Phelan (FF)	Paudie Coffey (FG)	Joe O'Reilly (FG)	Paul Coghlan (FG)
24th	2011	Kathryn Reilly (SF)	Jimmy Harte (Note: Resigned from the Seanad on 23 September due to ill health.) (Lab)	Marc MacSharry (FF)	Averil Power (Note: Resigned from Fianna Fáil party on 25 May 2015.) (FF)	Mary White (FF)	Imelda Henry (FG)	Colm Burke (Note: Elected to Dáil Éireann on 8 February 2020.) (FG)	Catherine Noone (FG)	Paul Coghlan (FG)
24th	2015	Kathryn Reilly (SF)	Máiría Cahill (Note: Elected to Seanad at a by-election on 13 November 2015, replacing Jimmy Harte.) (Lab)	Marc MacSharry (FF)	Averil Power (FF)	Mary White (FF)	Imelda Henry (FG)	Colm Burke (FG)	Catherine Noone (FG)	Paul Coghlan (FG)
25th	2016	Pádraig Mac Lochlainn (SF)	Aodhán Ó Ríordáin (Lab)	Frances Black (Ind)	Gerry Horkan (FF)	Catherine Ardagh (FF)	Aidan Davitt (FF)	Colm Burke (FG)	Catherine Noone (FG)	Paul Coghlan (FG)
26th	2020	Elisha McCallion (Note: Resigned from the Seanad on 29 October 2020.) (SF)	Mark Wall (Lab)	Frances Black (Ind)	Sharon Keogan (Ind)	Catherine Ardagh (FF)	Aidan Davitt (FF)	Ollie Crowe (FF)	Micheál Carrigy (FG)	Barry Ward (FG)
26th	2021	Gerry Horkan (Note: Elected at a by-election on 21 April 2021) (FF)	Mark Wall (Lab)	Frances Black (Ind)	Sharon Keogan (Ind)	Catherine Ardagh (FF)	Aidan Davitt (FF)	Ollie Crowe (FF)	Micheál Carrigy (FG)	Barry Ward (FG)
27th	2025	Conor Murphy (SF)	Laura Harmon (Lab)	Frances Black (Ind)	Sharon Keogan (Ind)	Mary Fitzpatrick (FF)	Aidan Davitt (FF)	Ollie Crowe (FF)	Garret Kelleher (FG)	Linda Nelson Murray (FG)

Note: The columns in this table are used only for presentational purposes, and no significance should be attached to the order of columns.

== List of nominating bodies ==
The following bodies are on the register of nominating bodies maintained by the Seanad Returning Officer for the Industrial and Commercial Panel.

- Association of Advertisers in Ireland
- Association of Patent and Trade Mark Attorneys
- The Caravan, Camping and Mobile Home Society Limited
- Chambers of Commerce of Ireland
- Chartered Institute of Logistics & Transport in Ireland
- Construction Industry Federation
- Credit Union Development Association Co-operative Society
- Electrical Industries Federation of Ireland
- Freight Transport Association Ireland
- Hardware Association Ireland
- Independent Broadcasters of Ireland
- Institute of Advertising Practitioners in Ireland
- Institute of Bankers in Ireland
- Institute of Certified Public Accountants in Ireland
- Institute of Chartered Accountants in Ireland
- Institution of Engineers of Ireland
- Institute of Industrial Engineers
- Institute of Management Consultants and Advisers
- Institute of Professional Auctioneers & Valuers
- Insurance Institute of Ireland
- Insurance Ireland
- Irish Business and Employers Confederation
- Irish Computer Society
- Irish Country Houses and Restaurants Association
- Irish Exporters Association
- Irish Hospitality Institute
- Irish Hotels Federation
- Irish Internet Association Limited
- Irish Planning Institute
- Irish Postmasters' Union
- Irish Road Haulage Association
- Irish Tourist Industry Confederation
- Irish Small and Medium Enterprise Association (ISME)
- Licensed Vintners' Association
- Marketing Institute of Ireland
- Marketing Society Limited
- National Housebuilding Guarantee Company Limited
- National Off-Licence Association
- Nursing Homes Ireland
- Restaurants Association of Ireland
- Retail Excellence
- Retail, Grocery, Dairy and Allied Trades Association (RGDATA)
- Royal Institute of the Architects of Ireland
- Society of Chartered Surveyors Ireland
- Society of the Irish Motor Industry
- Vintners' Federation of Ireland
- Wholesale Produce Ireland
