= Micheál Prendergast =

Irish farmer, businessman and politician (c.1921–1998)

Senator
- In office 23 April 1975 – 27 October 1977
- In office 22 July 1954 – 1 June 1973
- Constituency: Agricultural Panel

Personal details
- Born: 1 March 1907 Farranfore, County Kerry, Ireland
- Died: 20 September 1998 (aged 91) Melbourne, Australia
- Party: Fine Gael
- Spouse: Barbara Prendergast
- Children: 7

Micheál Anthony Prendergast (c.1921 – 25 March 1998) was an Irish farmer and trader, businessman and company director, and Fine Gael politician.

He was born in Farranfore, County Kerry and was raised in Kilcock, County Kildare. He married Barbara from Australia in 1959, and they had one son and six daughters.

He was a member of the Irish Live Stock Exporters' and Traders' Association and was its chairman in 1961 and 1969. He was a member of the national executive of the Irish Livestock Trade and was its chairman in 1970. He was a member of the Dublin Port and Docks Board. He spent many years in the livestock export business. He was a council member of the Agricultural Institute, now known as Teagasc, from 1960 to 1963.

He was a member of Seanad Éireann from 1954 to 1973 and from 1975 to 1977. He was first elected to the Seanad in 1954 by the Agricultural Panel. He did not contest the 1973 election but was elected in a by-election on 23 April 1975 by the Administrative Panel, replacing Seán Brosnan who had been elected to Dáil Éireann. He lost his seat at the 1977 election.

He retired to Australia in 1986 and died in Melbourne in 1998.
