= Frederick Summerfield =

Irish politician and businessman (1887–1975)

Senator
- In office 21 April 1948 – 22 July 1954
- Constituency: Industrial and Commercial Panel
- In office 7 March 1945 – 21 April 1948
- Constituency: Nominated by the Taoiseach

Personal details
- Born: 30 December 1887 Portobello, Dublin, Ireland
- Died: 22 July 1975 (aged 87) Dublin, Ireland
- Party: Independent
- Spouse: Nora O'Brien (m. 1913; death 1944)
- Children: 3

Frederick Maurice Summerfield (30 December 1887 – 22 July 1975) was an Irish independent politician and businessman. He was a member of Seanad Éireann from 1945 to 1954. He was nominated to Seanad on 7 March 1945, replacing Thomas Condon on the Industrial and Commercial Panel. He was re-elected at the 1948 and 1951 Seanad elections, but lost his seat at the 1954 election.

== Early life ==
He was born in Portobello, Dublin. His family moved to Birmingham when he was a child. He was educated at a CBS school, and at the age of 12 he took his first job in Birmingham as a brass and copper wire packer. While in Birmingham he was a member of the Gaelic League, played hurling, and was a champion Irish stepdancer.

== Career ==
In 1923 Summerfield opened his own company, F.M. Summerfield Ltd., and was the agent for American Chrysler cars. He started assembling Chrysler's in 1933 at his factory on Castleforbes Road, after the introduction of the requirement that all cars sold in Ireland had to be assembled there.

He was an unsuccessful candidate at the 1925 Seanad election. A peace commissioner, Summerfield served as an independent member of the Seanad, representing the interests of the motor industry. He was also president of the Society of Irish Motor Traders in 1923 and 1924, and the Irish Motor Agents Association from 1924 to 1925. He served as president of Dublin Chamber of Commerce in 1950.

Summerfield's other business interests included the first neon sign manufacturer in Ireland and being part owner of the Irish Cutlery Company.

== Personal life ==
Summerfield returned to Dublin in 1911. He married Nora O'Brien (1888–1944) in 1913 and they had three daughters.
