= Leader of the Seanad =

Member of Seanad Éireann appointed by the Taoiseach to direct government business

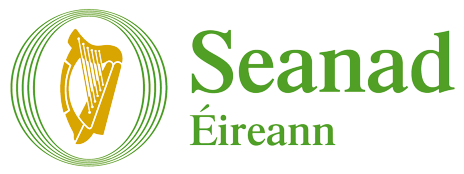

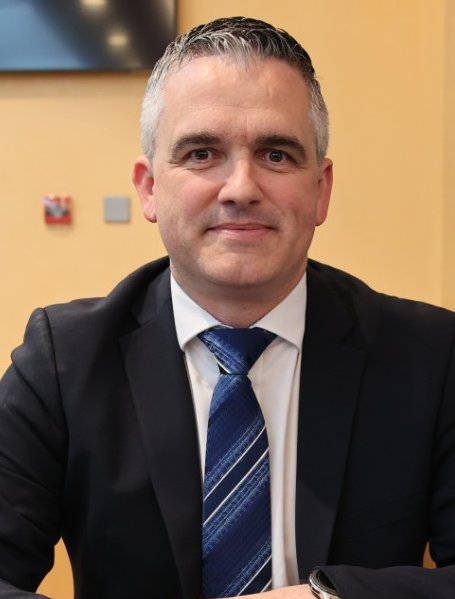
- Incumbent; Garret Ahearn since 17 June 2026
- Oireachtas
- Member of: Seanad Éireann
- Reports to: Cathaoirleach; Leas-Chathaoirleach
- Appointer: Taoiseach
- Formation: 27 April 1938
- First holder: William Quirke
- Salary: €108,183 annually (including €81,206 senator's salary)

The Leader of the Seanad (referred to within the Seanad as Leader of the House Irish: Treoraí an Tí) is a member of Seanad Éireann appointed by the Taoiseach to direct government business. The incumbent is Garret Ahearn of Fine Gael since June 2026. The deputy leader of the Seanad is Fiona O'Loughlin of Fianna Fáil.

== Role ==
The leader plays a similar role in the Seanad's procedure to that played by the Taoiseach in the Dáil:

- moving the day's order of business
- may present a government bill without prior notice
- ex officio member of the Committee on Procedure and Privileges
- may move a vote of sympathy

== History ==
In the Seanad of the Irish Free State, there was no separate position of leader. The order of business was controlled by the Cathaoirleach (chair). This was a symptom of the Seanad's independence from the Executive Council (government), which annoyed Éamon de Valera as President of the Executive Council. De Valera's Fianna Fáil government secured the abolition of the Seanad in 1936.

The Constitution of Ireland adopted in 1937 created a new Seanad with less independence from the Dáil. The standing orders of the new Seanad provided for the role of leader to control the flow of business from the government. A 2004 Seanad report into reforming its own functions recommended that the leader be allowed to attend cabinet meetings, with a rank of minister or minister of state. Maurice Manning noted in 2010 that recent leaders had more influence with the government, leading to increased input by the Seanad into legislation.

== List ==
| Name | Term of office | | Party | Governments | Notes |
|---|---|---|---|---|---|
| William Quirke | 1938 | 1948 | Fianna Fáil | 2nd, 3rd, 4th | |
| Michael Hayes | 1948 | 1951 | Fine Gael | 5th | |
| William Quirke | 1951 | 1954 | Fianna Fáil | 6th | |
| Michael Hayes | 1954 | 1957 | Fine Gael | 7th | |
| Thomas Mullins | 1957 | 1973 | Fianna Fáil | 8th, 9th, 10th, 11th, 12th, 13th | |
| Michael J. O'Higgins | 1 June 1973 | 27 October 1977 | Fine Gael | 14th | |
| Eoin Ryan Snr | 27 October 1977 | 8 October 1981 | Fianna Fáil | 15th, 16th | |
| Gemma Hussey | 8 October 1981 | February 1982 | Fine Gael | 17th | Vacated Seanad seat and leadership on election to Dáil. |
| Eoin Ryan Snr | 26 March 1982 | 21 December 1982 | Fianna Fáil | 18th | |
| James Dooge | 21 December 1982 | 3 April 1987 | Fine Gael | 19th | |
| Mick Lanigan | 3 April 1987 | 16 May 1990 | Fianna Fáil | 20th, 21st | Resigned as leader after Fianna Fáil lost a series of votes while all its senators were absent |
| Seán Fallon | 16 May 1990 | 23 January 1992 | Fianna Fáil | 21st | Vacated leadership upon being elected Cathaoirleach to replace Seán Doherty |
| G. V. Wright | 23 January 1992 | 20 December 1994 | Fianna Fáil | 21st, 22nd, 23rd | The 21st government ended when Charles Haughey resigned as Taoiseach, seven days after Doherty's resignation as Cathaoirleach over the same controversy |
| Maurice Manning | 20 December 1994 | 17 September 1997 | Fine Gael | 24th | |
| Donie Cassidy | 17 September 1997 | May 2002 | Fianna Fáil | 25th | Vacated Seanad seat and leadership on election to Dáil |
| Mary O'Rourke | 26 June 2002 | May 2007 | Fianna Fáil | 26th | Vacated Seanad seat and leadership on election to Dáil |
| Donie Cassidy | 3 July 2007 | 25 May 2011 | Fianna Fáil | 27th, 28th | |
| Maurice Cummins | 25 May 2011 | 8 June 2016 | Fine Gael | 29th | |
| Jerry Buttimer | 8 June 2016 | 27 June 2020 | Fine Gael | 30th, 31st | |
| Regina Doherty | 27 June 2020 | 17 December 2022 | Fine Gael | 32nd | |
| Lisa Chambers | 17 December 2022 | 30 January 2025 | Fianna Fáil | 33rd, 34th | |
| Seán Kyne | 12 February 2025 | 24 May 2026 | Fine Gael | 34th | Vacated Seanad seat and leadership on election to Dáil. |
| Garret Ahearn | 17 June 2026 | Incumbent | Fine Gael | 34th | |
