= Patrick O'Reilly (Longford politician) =

Irish politician (1911–2003)

Senator
- In office 18 August 1944 – 5 November 1969
- Constituency: Agricultural Panel

Personal details
- Born: 1910/1911 County Leitrim, Ireland
- Died: 2003 (aged 92–93) County Longford, Ireland
- Party: Fianna Fáil
- Spouse: Una Blessing (m. 1955)
- Children: 6

Patrick O'Reilly (1911 – March 2003) was an Irish Fianna Fáil politician. Born in Aughavas, County Leitrim, where he was a farmer, he later moved to Firmullagh, Moyne, County Longford. He served as a member of Leitrim County Council from 1942 to 1955.

O'Reilly was elected to Seanad Éireann as a Fianna Fáil Senator on the Agricultural Panel in 1944. He was re-elected at each subsequent Seanad election until he lost his seat in 1969.

He died in March 2003, at the age of 92.
