= Seán Ruane =

Irish politician (died 1967)

Senator
- In office 8 September 1943 – 22 May 1957
- Constituency: Labour Panel

Personal details
- Died: 24 March 1967
- Party: Independent

Seán T. Ruane (died 24 March 1967) was an Irish politician and schoolteacher. He was an independent member of Seanad Éireann from 1943 to 1957. He was first elected to the 4th Seanad in 1943 by the Labour Panel. He was re-elected at the 1944, 1948, 1951 and 1954 Seanad elections but lost his seat at the 1957 election.
