= Pádraig Ó Siochfhradha =

Irish writer, politician and teacher (1883–1964)

Senator
- In office 22 May 1957 – 19 November 1964
- In office 14 August 1951 – 22 July 1954
- In office 18 August 1944 – 21 April 1948
- Constituency: Nominated by the Taoiseach

Personal details
- Born: 10 March 1883 Dingle, County Kerry, Ireland
- Died: 19 November 1964 (aged 81) Dublin, Ireland
- Party: Independent
- Spouse: Siobhán Ní Shúilleabháin
- Children: 1

Pádraig Ó Siochfhradha (Irish pronunciation: [ˈpˠaːd̪ˠɾˠəɟ oː ʃʊˈxɾˠuː]; 10 March 1883 – 19 November 1964) and his brother Mícheál Ó Siochfhradha were Irish language writers, teachers and storytellers, from Dingle, County Kerry, Ireland.

Pádraig Ó Siochfhradha wrote under the Irish pen-name An Seabhac (pronounced [ənˠ ˈʃəuk]; "The Hawk"; contemporary spelling An Seaḃac). His most famous book is the semi-autobiographical comedy Jimín Mháire Thaidhg, published in 1919, which follows Jimín's childhood under the control of his powerful mother, Máire. Ó Siochfhradha became an active organiser for the Irish Volunteers in 1913 and was imprisoned three times for his activities.

He was an independent member of Seanad Éireann from 1946 to 1948, 1951 to 1954, and 1957 to 1964, being nominated by the Taoiseach on each occasion. He was secretary to the Irish Manuscripts Commission from October 1928 to October 1932.

The Irish postal service, An Post, released a 26 pence postage stamp on 7 April 1983 bearing a portrait of Ó Siochfhradha to commemorate the centenary of his birth.

== Books ==
- Pádraig Ó Siochfhradha (An Seabhac), An Baile seo 'gainn-ne: Cnuasach Sgéal n-Úrnua, Cónnradh na Gaedhilge: Cló-Chuallacht Fódhla (1913)
- An Seabhac (Pádraig Ó Siochfhradha), Jimín Mháire Thaidhg, Comhlucht Oideachais na hÉireann (Educational Company of Ireland) (1919)
- An Seabhac, Jimín .i. eagrán scoile de "Jimín Mháire Thaidhg" [Jimín i.e., a school edition of "Jimín Mháire Thaidhg"], Comhlucht Oideachais na hÉireann (Educational Company of Ireland) (1921)
- An Seabhac, Learner's English-Irish dictionary: for use in schools and colleges and by students in general, Comhlucht Oideachais na hÉireann (Educational Company of Ireland) (1923)
- An Seabhac, Seanfhocail na Muimhneach, Comhlucht Oideachais na hÉireann (Educational Company of Ireland) (1926)
- An Seabhac (ed.) Tóraidheacht an Ghiolla Dheacair agus a Chapaill, Comhlucht Oideachais na hÉireann (Educational Company of Ireland) (1939)
- An Seabhac (ed.) Tóraidheacht Dhiarmada agus Ghráinne, Comhlucht Oideachais na hÉireann (Educational Company of Ireland) (1939)
- An Seabhac (ed.) Laoithe na Féinne: Ceithre Laoithe agus Trí Fichid den bhFiannaigheacht, Dublin: Talbot Press (1941).
- An Seabhac, Seanfhocail na Mumhan [Seanfhocail na Muimhneach (1926) translated into Dublin standard Irish and expanded] by Pádraig Ua Maoileoin: An Gum (1984), ISBN 1-85791-511-9
- Pádraig Ó Siochfhradha, Jimeen: An Irish Comic Classic, [an English translation of Jimín Mháire Thaidhg], translated by Íde Ní Laoghaire and Peter Fallon, Dublin: O'Brien Press (1984) ISBN 0-86278-680-0
