= James G. Douglas =

Irish politician (1887–1954)

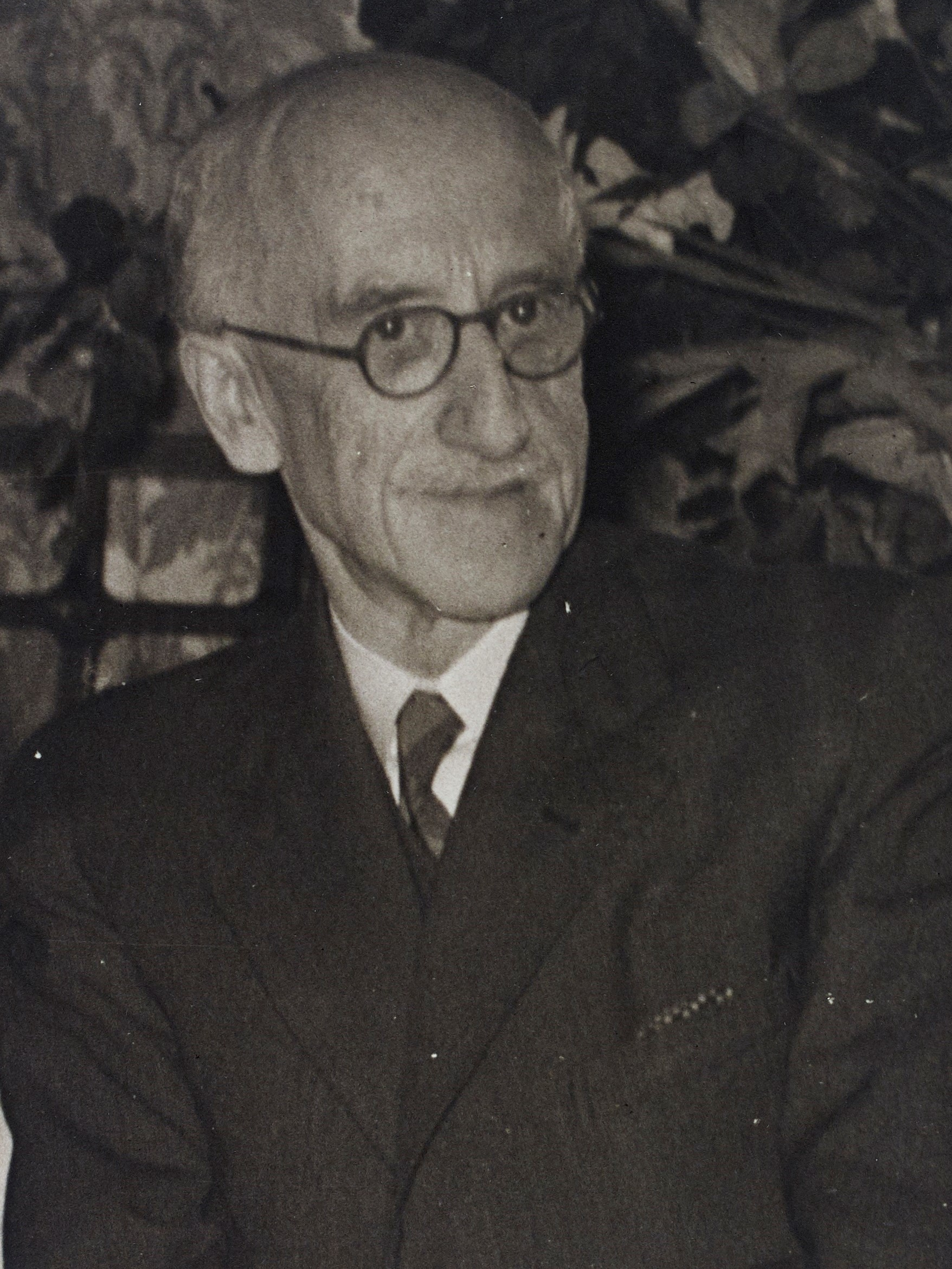
- Douglas, c. 1940s

Leas-Chathaoirleach of Seanad Éireann
- In office 12 December 1922 – 9 December 1925
- Preceded by: Office created
- Succeeded by: Thomas Westropp Bennett

Senator
- In office 22 July 1954 – 16 September 1954
- In office 21 April 1948 – 14 August 1951
- Constituency: Nominated by the Taoiseach
- In office 14 August 1951 – 22 July 1954
- In office 18 August 1944 – 21 April 1948
- In office 27 April 1938 – 8 September 1943
- Constituency: Industrial and Commercial Panel

Senator
- In office 11 December 1922 – 29 May 1936

Personal details
- Born: 11 July 1887; Dublin, Ireland
- Died: 16 September 1954 (aged 67)
- Political party: Independent
- Spouse: Georgina Culley (m. 1911)
- Children: 2, including John

James Green Douglas (11 July 1887 – 16 September 1954) was an Irish businessman and politician. In 1922 Douglas served as the first-ever Leas-Chathaoirleach (deputy chairperson) of Seanad Éireann, the upper house of the newly independent Irish parliament. Douglas would go on to serve in the Seanad for 30 years.

== Family ==
He was the eldest of nine children of John Douglas (1861–1931), originally of Grange, County Tyrone, and his wife, Emily (1864–1933), daughter of John and Mary Mitton of Gortin, Coalisland, County Tyrone. The genealogy of the Douglas family to which he belonged can be traced to Samuel Douglas of Coolhill, Killyman, County Tyrone.

On 14 February 1911, Douglas married Georgina (Ena) Culley (1883–1959), originally of Tirsogue, Lurgan, County Armagh. Their children were John Douglas, who replaced his father as senator, and James Arthur Douglas (1915–1990).

== Political career ==
Douglas was an Irish nationalist Quaker who managed the Irish White Cross from 1920 to 1922. He was appointed by Michael Collins as chair of the committee to draft the Constitution of the Irish Free State following the Irish War of Independence.

Douglas went on to become a very active member of Seanad Éireann between 1922 and 1936 under the constitution he had helped to prepare. In 1922 he was elected as the first deputy chair of the Senate. The Senate was abolished in 1936 and re-established under the terms of the 1937 Constitution; he was again an active Senator between 1938 and 1943, and from 1944 to 1954. The topics most associated with him during his work as Senator were international refugees and the League of Nations.

== Sources ==
- Century of Endeavour – Senator James G Douglas short biography by Roy Johnston, 1999.
- Memoirs of Senator James G. Douglas – Concerned Citizen ISBN 978-1-900621-19-9
