= Andrew Clarkin =

Irish politician (1891–1955)

Senator
- In office 21 April 1948 – 23 November 1955
- Constituency: Industrial and Commercial Panel
- In office 18 August 1944 – 21 April 1948
- Constituency: Administrative Panel

Lord Mayor of Dublin
- In office 1951–1953
- Preceded by: Jack Belton
- Succeeded by: Bernard Butler

Personal details
- Born: 1891 Mullingar, County Westmeath, Ireland
- Died: 23 November 1955 (aged 63–64)
- Party: Fianna Fáil
- Spouse: Elizabeth Clarkin

Andrew Sylvester Clarkin (1891 – 23 November 1955) was an Irish Fianna Fáil politician.

== Biography ==
Born in Mullingar, County Westmeath, Clarkin was the son of Andrew Clarkin and Rose Anne Corrigan.

He stood for election to Dáil Éireann as a Fianna Fáil candidate for Dublin South at the 1944 general election but was unsuccessful. He was elected to Seanad Éireann on the Administrative Panel at the 1944 Seanad election. He was re-elected to the Seanad at the 1948, 1951 and 1954 Seanad elections on the Industrial and Commercial Panel. He was an unsuccessful candidate at the 1952 Dublin North-West by-election. He died in 1955 while serving in the 8th Seanad.

He served as Lord Mayor of Dublin from 1951 to 1953.

Civic offices
Preceded by Jack Belton	Lord Mayor of Dublin; 1951–1953	Succeeded by Bernard Butler
