= Patrick Baxter (politician) =

Irish politician (1891–1959)

Cathaoirleach of Seanad Éireann
- In office 22 July 1954 – 22 May 1957
- Preceded by: Liam Ó Buachalla
- Succeeded by: Liam Ó Buachalla

Senator
- In office 27 September 1938 – 3 April 1959
- Constituency: Agricultural Panel

Senator
- In office 12 December 1934 – 29 May 1936

Teachta Dála
- In office August 1923 – September 1927
- Constituency: Cavan

Personal details
- Born: 1 October 1891 County Cavan, Ireland
- Died: 3 April 1959 (aged 67) County Cavan, Ireland
- Party: Clann na Talmhan
- Other political affiliations: Farmers' Party; Cumann na nGaedheal; National Centre Party; Fine Gael

Patrick Francis Baxter (1 October 1891 – 3 April 1959) was an Irish politician from County Cavan. He was a Teachta Dála (TD) in the 1920s, and later a Senator for over 25 years, serving as Cathaoirleach of Seanad Éireann from 1954 to 1957.

Baxter was first elected to Dáil Éireann at the 1923 general election, when he won a seat as Farmers' Party TD for Cavan in the 4th Dáil. He had stood unsuccessfully in the 1922 general election, but after topping the poll in 1923 he was re-elected at the June 1927 general election with his vote halved. He lost his seat at the September 1927 general election.

After the collapse of the Farmers' Party in the late 1920s, he made three further unsuccessful attempts to return to the Dáil: at the 1932 general election as a Cumann na nGaedheal candidate in Cavan, at the 1933 general election as a National Centre Party candidate in Clare, and as a Fine Gael candidate in Cavan at the 1943 general election.

He was elected in 1934 as a senator for Fine Gael, for a nine-year term, but the Free State Seanad was abolished in 1936. When the house was re-established, he was re-elected in 1938 to the 2nd Seanad on the Agricultural Panel, and held the seat until his death in office in 1959. He was a senator from 1944 onwards and a Clann na Talmhan senator from 1943 onwards,and a Seanad from 1938 onwards. Though regarded as a sanator of Clann na Talmhan during 3nd Seanad by Houses of the Oireachtas website, the party had yet to be founded at 1938. On 16 November 1938, Baxter was proposed as Leas-Chathaoirleach by John Counilan, an Independent, and John Butler of Fine Gael,and finnally was defeated by a vote of 15 to 2. On 25 Octorber 1944, He seconded the proposal by Michael Hayes (FG) to nominate Timothy O'Donovan (FG) for the position of Leas-Chathaoirleach. On 22 July 1954, Patrick Baxter (CnaT), was proposed by Michael Hayes (FG) and seconded by William Quirke (FF) for the position of Cathaoirleach. He was elected unopposed. On 22 May 1957, Patrick Baxter (CnaT) was proposed for the position of Cathaoirleach but was defeated by Liam Ó Buachalla (FF) by a vote of 32 to 22.

Oireachtas
Preceded by Liam Ó Buachalla	Cathaoirleach of Seanad Éireann; 1954–1957	Succeeded by Liam Ó Buachalla

Dáil	Election	Deputy (Party)	Deputy (Party)	Deputy (Party)	Deputy (Party)
2nd	1921	Arthur Griffith (SF)	Peter Paul Galligan (SF)	Seán Milroy (SF)	3 seats 1921–1923
3rd	1922	Arthur Griffith (PT-SF)	Walter L. Cole (PT-SF)	Seán Milroy (PT-SF)	3 seats 1921–1923
4th	1923	Patrick Smith (Rep)	John James Cole (Ind.)	Seán Milroy (CnaG)	Patrick Baxter (FP)
4th	1925 by-election	Patrick Smith (Rep)	John James Cole (Ind.)	John Joe O'Reilly (CnaG)	Patrick Baxter (FP)
5th	1927 (Jun)	Patrick Smith (FF)	John O'Hanlon (Ind.)	John Joe O'Reilly (CnaG)	Patrick Baxter (FP)
6th	1927 (Sep)	Patrick Smith (FF)	John O'Hanlon (Ind.)	John Joe O'Reilly (CnaG)	John James Cole (Ind.)
7th	1932	Patrick Smith (FF)	John O'Hanlon (Ind.)	John Joe O'Reilly (CnaG)	Michael Sheridan (FF)
8th	1933	Patrick Smith (FF)	Patrick McGovern (NCP)	John Joe O'Reilly (CnaG)	Michael Sheridan (FF)
9th	1937	Patrick Smith (FF)	Patrick McGovern (FG)	John James Cole (Ind.)	Michael Sheridan (FF)
10th	1938	Patrick Smith (FF)	Patrick McGovern (FG)	John James Cole (Ind.)	Michael Sheridan (FF)
11th	1943	Patrick Smith (FF)	Patrick O'Reilly (CnaT)	John James Cole (Ind.)	Michael Sheridan (FF)
12th	1944	Patrick Smith (FF)	Patrick O'Reilly (CnaT)	Tom O'Reilly (Ind.)	Michael Sheridan (FF)
13th	1948	Patrick Smith (FF)	John Tully (CnaP)	Patrick O'Reilly (Ind.)	Michael Sheridan (FF)
14th	1951	Patrick Smith (FF)	John Tully (CnaP)	Patrick O'Reilly (FG)	Michael Sheridan (FF)
15th	1954	Patrick Smith (FF)	John Tully (CnaP)	Patrick O'Reilly (FG)	Michael Sheridan (FF)
16th	1957	Patrick Smith (FF)	John Tully (CnaP)	Patrick O'Reilly (FG)	Michael Sheridan (FF)
17th	1961	Patrick Smith (FF)	Séamus Dolan (FF)	Patrick O'Reilly (FG)	3 seats 1961–1977
18th	1965	Patrick Smith (FF)	John Tully (CnaP)	Tom Fitzpatrick (FG)	3 seats 1961–1977
19th	1969	Patrick Smith (FF)	Patrick O'Reilly (FG)	Tom Fitzpatrick (FG)	3 seats 1961–1977
20th	1973	Patrick Smith (FF)	John Wilson (FF)	Tom Fitzpatrick (FG)	3 seats 1961–1977
21st	1977	Constituency abolished. See Cavan–Monaghan			
