= James McGee (Irish politician) =

Irish politician (1885–1956)

Senator
- In office 7 September 1938 – 19 January 1956
- Constituency: Administrative Panel

Personal details
- Born: 23 September 1885; County Louth, Ireland
- Died: 19 January 1956 (aged 70); County Louth, Ireland
- Political party: Independent

James Thomas McGee (23 September 1885 – 19 January 1956) was an Irish farmer, cattle dealer and politician.

The owner of a 750 acres (300 hectares) farm at Kellystown near Ardee, County Louth, he was chairman of the Irish Cattle Traders and Stockowners Association. He was involved in local politics. He was a member of Louth County Council for forty years, of which he was chairman from 1925 to 1955. He was also chairman of Ardee Town Commissioners.

He was an independent member of Seanad Éireann from 1938 to 1956. He was first elected to the 3rd Seanad in 1938 by the Administrative Panel. He was re-elected at the 1943, 1944, 1948, 1951 and 1954 Seanad elections. He died in office in 1956, and William Woods was elected to fill the vacancy.
