= Frederick Hawkins (politician) =

Irish politician (died 1956)

Senator
- In office 24 July 1946 – 2 August 1956
- In office 27 April 1938 – 18 August 1944
- Constituency: Labour Panel

Personal details
- Died: 2 August 1956
- Party: Independent

Frederick Joseph Hawkins (died 2 August 1956) was an Irish politician. He was an independent member of Seanad Éireann from 1938 to 1944, and 1946 to 1956. He was first elected to the 2nd Seanad in April 1938 by the Labour Panel.

He was re-elected in August 1938 and 1943, again by the Labour Panel but lost his seat at the 1944 Seanad election. He was re-elected to Seanad at a by-election on 24 July 1946, replacing John Thomas Keane. He was re-elected at the 1948, 1951 and 1954 Seanad elections. He died in office in 1956. No by-election was held to fill his seat.
