= William Quirke =

Irish politician and revolutionary (c.1896–1955)

Senator
- In office 27 April 1938 – 5 March 1955
- Constituency: Agricultural Panel

Senator
- In office 9 December 1931 – 29 May 1936

Personal details
- Born: c.1896
- Died: 5 March 1955 (aged 58–59)
- Party: Fianna Fáil
- Spouse: Clare Riordan (m. 1928)

William Quirke (c. 1896 – 5 March 1955) was an Irish Fianna Fáil politician and a prominent figure in County Tipperary during the Irish War of Independence.

== Early life ==
Born in Clonmel, he was educated at Rockwell College, County Tipperary. During the Irish War of Independence he served with the Tipperary Brigade of the Irish Republican Army (IRA) as an intelligence officer. He became Commanding Officer of the Second Southern Division and was arrested and interned on Spike Island but escaped. He opposed the Anglo-Irish Treaty and fought with the Anti-Treaty IRA forces. During the Irish Civil War he issued a proclamation that if any member of his Command was executed he would have an equivalent number of leading Free State citizens executed as a result. None were executed by the Government forces as a result. At the 1923 general election he was an unsuccessful Sinn Féin candidate in the Tipperary constituency.

After the end of the Civil War, Quirke left Ireland and went to the United States, Canada and Mexico where he held a variety of different jobs including a ranchman, builders' labourer, lumberjack and cowpuncher. While in Los Angeles, California he married Clare Riordan in January 1928. The couple then returned to Ireland where Quirke joined the newly formed Fianna Fáil party. He was one of seven successful Fianna Fáil candidates who secured election to Free State Seanad at the 1931 Seanad election, securing a nine-year term. He was a member of the Seanad until its abolition in 1936.

== Political career ==
From 1938 onwards, he was re-elected by the Agricultural Panel to the new Seanad Éireann In the upper house he was the Fianna Fáil Leader of the Seanad and chief spokesperson. He was also a vice-president of Fianna Fáil. When the party was in opposition he acted as Leader of the Opposition in the Seanad. A farmer, he was also a partner of Stokes and Quirke, an auctioneering firm with offices in Dublin, Clonmel, Fethard and London and was for a time a director with the Agricultural Credit Corporation and Butlin's Irish Associates. When the Turf Development Board was created in 1934, Quirke was appointed as part-time board member at the request of Todd Andrews. This organisation became Bord na Móna.

In 1947 three gentlemen representing a company called Trans-World retained the services of Stokes and Quirke to buy Locke's whiskey distillery in Kilbeggan, County Westmeath. They managed to secure an appointment to have tea with the President Seán T. O'Kelly, which was photographed, as they appealed for extra time before putting down their initial down payment of IR£75,000. As the weeks passed people became suspicious of their backgrounds and the Minister for Justice, Gerald Boland, ordered an investigation which resulted in their arrests. Two fled the country while the third was put on the mailboat to Holyhead. As there were by-elections in the offing the opposition capitalised on the issue. Oliver J. Flanagan, in particular, made a number of allegations of corruption in the Dáil and the Government under Éamon de Valera set up the Locke Tribunal to investigate the matter. The report was very critical of Flanagan and called him irresponsible but did not find any Fianna Fáil politician guilty of corruption. Nevertheless, the perception remained going into the 1948 general election which benefitted the Clann na Poblachta party.

== Death ==
Quirke died while on a stag hunt with the Ward Union Hunt on 5 March 1955 while still a senator. He is buried in Dean's Grange Cemetery. The resulting by-election to fill the vacancy caused by the death was held on 14 May 1956, and was won by Joe Sheridan of Fine Gael.
