= 2024 Cork County Council election =

Part of the 2024 Irish local elections

- 7 June 2024

All 55 seats on Cork County Council 28 seats needed for a majority
	First party	Second party	Third party
Party	Fianna Fáil	Fine Gael	Independent
Seats won	19	18	8
Seat change	▲1	▼2	▼2
	Fourth party	Fifth party	Sixth party
Party	Independent Ireland	Social Democrats	Labour
Seats won	4	3	2
Seat change	▲4	▲2	Steady
	Seventh party
Party	Sinn Féin
Seats won	1
Seat change	▼1
- Results by Local Electoral Area

An election to all 55 seats on Cork County Council was held on 7 June 2024 as part of the 2024 Irish local elections. County Cork is divided into 10 local electoral areas (LEAs) to elect councillors for a five-year term of office on the electoral system of proportional representation by means of the single transferable vote (PR-STV).

== Results by party ==
Party	First-preference votes			Seats				
Party	Votes	% FPv	Swing (pp)	Cand.	2019	Out.	Elected 2024	Change
Fianna Fáil	39,958	27.54	▼6.20	23	18	17	19	▲1
Fine Gael	42,043	28.98	▼2.90	24	20	19	18	▼2
Independent Ireland	9,828	6.77	New	8	New	1	4	▲4
Social Democrats	6,573	4.65	▲2.13	7	1	2	3	▲2
Labour	5,512	3.80	▲0.56	5	2	2	2	Steady
Sinn Féin	7,185	4.95	▼0.49	10	2	0	1	▼1
Green	3,967	2.73	▼0.16	10	2	1	0	▼2
Aontú	3,071	2.12	▲0.33	6	0	0	0	Steady
Ireland First	1,267	0.87	New	2	New	0	0	Steady
The Irish People	678	0.47	New	3	New	0	0	Steady
Glór	559	0.39	New	1	New	0	0	Steady
People Before Profit	492	0.34	▲0.20	1	0	0	0	Steady
Independent	23,782	16.39	▼1.34	22	10	13	8	▼2
Total Valid	145,089	99.19						
Spoilt votes	1,184	0.81						
Total	146,273	100.00	—	122	55	55	55	Steady
Registered voters/Turnout	284,173	51.47						

== Results by local electoral area ==
=== Bandon–Kinsale ===
Bandon–Kinsale: 6 Seats
Party	Candidate	FPv%	Count							
Party	Candidate	FPv%	1	2	3	4	5	6	7	8
Independent	Alan Coleman	15.08%	2,511							
Independent Ireland	John Collins	14.30%	2,380							
Fine Gael	John Michael Foley	13.18%	2,194	2,208	2,223	2,234	2,254	2,527		
Social Democrats	Ann Bambury	10.81%	1,800	1,814	1,967	2,135	2,247	2,370	2,387	
Fianna Fáil	Gillian Coughlan	10.37%	1,726	1,751	1,764	1,782	1,829	1,979	1,999	2,485
Fine Gael	Marie O'Sullivan	9.60%	1,598	1,624	1,656	1,668	1,772	1,980	2,070	2,211
Fianna Fáil	Sean O'Donovan	6.72%	1,118	1,128	1,142	1,163	1,197	1,303	1,310	1,629
Fine Gael	Gerard Seaman	5.94%	988	995	1,010	1,021	1,034			
Fianna Fáil	Margaret Murphy O'Mahony	5.91%	983	1,003	1,022	1,056	1,100	1,199	1,213	
Independent	Brendan Piper	2.93%	488	497	579	663				
Sinn Féin	Clare O'Callaghan	2.66%	443	446	478					
Green	Stephen Spillane	1.63%	272	274						
The Irish People	Deborah O'Driscoll	0.87%	145	147						
Electorate: 31,002 Valid: 16,646 Spoilt: 102 Quota: 2,379 Turnout: 16,748 (54.02%)

=== Bantry–West Cork ===
Bantry–West Cork: 4 Seats
Party	Candidate	FPv%	Count							
Party	Candidate	FPv%	1	2	3	4	5	6	7	8
Independent Ireland	Danny Collins	19.25%	2,386	2,431	2,515					
Independent	Finbarr Harrington	15.09%	1,870	1,894	1,968	2,048	2,071	2,258	2,668	
Fine Gael	Caroline Cronin	13.68%	1,696	1,709	1,738	2,042	2,050	2,288	2,438	2,478
Fianna Fáil	Patrick Gerard Murphy	10.98%	1,361	1,367	1,390	1,463	1,471	1,574	2,050	2,185
Independent	Helen O'Sullivan	10.81%	1,340	1,369	1,403	1,499	1,510	1,768	1,962	1,995
Fianna Fáil	Danny Crowley	10.08%	1,245	1,253	1,264	1,317	1,319	1,411		
Social Democrats	Chris Heinhold	8.02%	994	1,057	1,068	1,285	1,288			
Fine Gael	Mary Lou Leahy	4.34%	562	567	586					
Green	Liz Coakley Wakefield	2.37%	294	314	318					
Aontú	Patrick Murphy	2.33%	289	304						
Sinn Féin	Colum O'Callaghan	2.08%	258							
Electorate: 21,485 Valid: 12,295 Spoilt: 101 Quota: 2,460 Turnout: 12,396 (57.70%)

=== Carrigaline ===
Carrigaline: 6 Seats
Party	Candidate	FPv%	Count							
Party	Candidate	FPv%	1	2	3	4	5	6	7	8
Fianna Fáil	Séamus McGrath	36.06%	5,191							
Independent	Ben Dalton-O'Sullivan	16.08%	2,315							
Fine Gael	Jack White	10.91%	1,570	2,307						
Sinn Féin	Eoghan Fahy	9.40%	1,353	1,632	1,659	1,677	1,685	1,716	1,830	2,039
Fine Gael	Una McCarthy	7.59%	1,092	1,686	1,754	1,852	1,885	2,029	2,102	
Fianna Fáil	Audrey Buckley	6.72%	967	1,983	2,030	2,110				
Green	Monica Oikeh	3.82%	550	703	726	743	749	857	1,096	1,336
Independent	Chris O'Brien	3.76%	541	703	769	784	787	822	922	
Social Democrats	Richard Terry	3.16%	455	522	535	542	542	614		
Labour	John O'Regan	2.51%	361	487	501	516	519			
Electorate: 30,679 Valid: 14,395 Spoilt: 100 Quota: 2,057 Turnout: 14,495 (47.25%)

=== Cobh ===
Cobh: 6 Seats
Party	Candidate	FPv%	Count										
Party	Candidate	FPv%	1	2	3	4	5	6	7	8	9	10	11
Fianna Fáil	Sheila O'Callaghan	17.05%	2,202										
Fine Gael	Anthony Barry	14.98%	1,935										
Labour	Cathal Rasmussen	11.98%	1,547	1,552	1,606	1,649	1,654	1,709	1,752	1,782	1,924		
Fine Gael	Sinéad Sheppard	11.59%	1,497	1,617	1,639	1,669	1,710	1,755	2,116				
Independent Ireland	Ger Curley	10.01%	1,293	1,302	1,409	1,454	1,458	1,739	1,773	1,784	2,001		
Fianna Fáil	Dominic Finn	7.28%	940	1,053	1,083	1,098	1,110	1,125	1,208	1,298	1,338	1,362	1,376
Green	Cliona O'Halloran	6.46%	834	851	869	982	990	1,029	1,075	1,116	1,264	1,318	
Fine Gael	Keith Kelly	4.99%	645	699	703	714	728	733					
Sinn Féin	Mehdi Ozcinar	4.80%	620	628	646	788	790	872	891	894			
Glór – Voice of the People	Diarmaid Ó Cadhla	4.33%	559	567	620	663	666						
People Before Profit	Rola Abu Zeid O'Neill	3.81%	492	502	515								
Independent	Peter Kidney	2.81%	357	363									
Electorate: 28,604 Valid: 12,915 Spoilt: 106 Quota: 1,846 Turnout: 13,021 (45.52%)

=== Fermoy ===
Fermoy: 6 Seats
Party	Candidate	FPv%	Count								
Party	Candidate	FPv%	1	2	3	4	5	6	7	8	9
Independent	William O'Leary	17.70%	2,920								
Fine Gael	Noel McCarthy	15.90%	2,624								
Fianna Fáil	Frank O'Flynn	13.03%	2,150	2,264	2,333	2,382					
Fianna Fáil	Deirdre O'Brien	11.46%	1,891	1,932	1,963	1,991	2,131	2,245	2,328	2,795	
Fianna Fáil	Nelius Cotter	9.93%	1,239	1,306	1,334	1,391	1,548	1,607	1,695	1,903	2,030
Fine Gael	Kay Dawson	6.42%	1,059	1,095	1,157	1,199	1,254	1,297	1,325		
Independent	Peter O'Donoghue	5.68%	937	1,025	1,043	1,095	1,192	1,281	1,648	1,742	1,784
Labour	Diarmuid Hanley	5.55%	915	975	987	1,095	1,125	1,289	1,369	1,625	1,742
Ireland First	Derek Blighe	5.49%	899	939	951	1,001	1,070	1,158			
Sinn Féin	Joe O'Brien	4.39%	725	743	757	805	853				
Independent	Frank Roche	3.81%	628	687	694	733					
Green	Mary Ryder	1.15%	189	197	199						
Independent Ireland	Ken Brennan	0.98%	162	178	181						
Independent	Joe Tobin	0.62%	102	114	122						
Independent	Thomas Horgan	0.37%	61	64	64						
Electorate: 31,544 Valid: 16,501 Spoilt: 154 Quota: 2,358 Turnout: 16,655 (52.80%)

=== Kanturk ===
Kanturk: 4 Seats
Party	Candidate	FPv%	Count							
Party	Candidate	FPv%	1	2	3	4	5	6	7	8
Fianna Fáil	Bernard Moynihan	26.54%	3,030							
Fine Gael	John Paul O'Shea	19.14%	2,185	2,356						
Fine Gael	Trish Murphy	17.84%	2,037	2,232	2,264	2,292				
Fianna Fáil	Ian Doyle	10.51%	1,200	1,396	1,409	1,434	1,503	1,632	1,705	1,855
Aontú	Becky Kealy	8.35%	953	1,034	1,052	1,065	1,141	1,227	1,485	1,794
Sinn Féin	Evelyn O'Keefe	4.69%	536	550	552	565	599	736	812	
Independent	Finbarr Cronin	4.46%	509	581	586	596	681	724		
Social Democrats	Andrew Ring	3.64%	416	423	424	477	530			
Independent Ireland	Brendan O'Connor	3.49%	398	404	404	407				
Green	Ted Bradley	1.35%	154	158	159					
Electorate: 21,479 Valid: 11,418 Spoilt: 104 Quota: 2,284 Turnout: 11,522 (53.64%)

=== Macroom ===
Macroom: 6 Seats
Party	Candidate	FPv%	Count						
Party	Candidate	FPv%	1	2	3	4	5	6	7
Fianna Fáil	Gobnait Moynihan	15.71%	2,794						
Fine Gael	Michael Creed	14.58%	2,593						
Fianna Fáil	Michael Looney	14.10%	2,508	2,584					
Fine Gael	Eileen Lynch	13.36%	2,376	2,408	2,460	2,473	2,739		
Fine Gael	Ted Lucey	11.57%	2,058	2,085	2,116	2,136	2,269	2,419	2,536
Independent	Martin Coughlan	8.31%	1,478	1,517	1,624	1,630	1,804	2,176	2,214
Independent Ireland	Dermot Kelleher	7.52%	1,337	1,371	1,556	1,565	1,614	1,896	1,906
Sinn Féin	John O'Sullivan	6.28%	1,117	1,134	1,192	1,194	1,366		
Green	Harriet Burgess	5.28%	939	954	998	999			
Aontú	Rosarie O'Leary	3.31%	588	600					
Electorate: 32,318 Valid: 17,788 Spoilt: 140 Quota: 2,542 Turnout: 17,928 (55.47%)

=== Mallow ===
Mallow: 5 Seats
Party	Candidate	FPv%	Count						
Party	Candidate	FPv%	1	2	3	4	5	6	7
Fine Gael	Tony O'Shea	22.26%	2,615						
Fine Gael	Liam Madden	21.89%	2,571						
Labour	Eoghan Kenny	19.06%	2,239						
Fianna Fáil	Gearóid Murphy	11.31%	1,329	1,583	1,790	1,874	1,911	1,971	
Fianna Fáil	Pat Hayes	9.16%	1,076	1,291	1,559	1,629	1,659	1,697	1,861
Sinn Féin	Melissa O'Brien	7.37%	866	955	1,012	1,077	1,100	1,205	1,402
Aontú	Paddy Scully	3.08%	362	397	424	438	454	482	
The Irish People	Ross Cannon	2.74%	322	346	361	373	375	389	
Social Democrats	David Curry	1.98%	233	255	276	299	333		
Green	Paul McNally	1.14%	134	152	170	183			
Electorate: 23,585 Valid: 11,747 Spoilt: 105 Quota: 1,958 Turnout: 11,852 (50.25%)

=== Midleton ===
Midleton: 7 Seats
Party	Candidate	FPv%	Count											
Party	Candidate	FPv%	1	2	3	4	5	6	7	8	9	10	11	12
Independent	Mary Linehan Foley	18.28%	2,962											
Fine Gael	Michael Hegarty	13.06%	2,116											
Fianna Fáil	Patrick Mulcahy	10.06%	1,629	1,814	1,836	1,846	1,863	1,885	1,897	1,936	1,977	1,986	2,036	
Social Democrats	Liam Quaide	9.91%	1,606	1,681	1,685	1,700	1,726	1,901	1,923	2,007	2,162			
Fine Gael	Rory Cocking	8.64%	1,400	1,422	1,444	1,449	1,460	1,502	1,506	1,649	1,689	1,707	1,771	1,872
Fianna Fáil	Ann Marie Ahern	6.50%	1,053	1,092	1,099	1,101	1,108	1,132	1,136	1,210	1,253	1,267	1,328	1,468
Independent	John Buckley	5.32%	862	898	901	920	939	946	994	1,179	1,332	1,352	1,546	1,835
Fine Gael	Alison Curtin	4.96%	803	1,091	1,110	1,138	1,140	1,176	1,239	1,260	1,298	1,301	1,346	1,417
Sinn Féin	Edith Adams	4.41%	715	754	755	765	774	805	836	864	905	919		
Aontú	Mona Stromsoe	4.27%	692	716	718	725	741	751	808	852	965	981	1,103	
Independent	Seán Buckley	4.04%	654	681	684	695	715	723	742					
Independent Ireland	Eileen Kelly McCarthy	3.67%	595	635	638	658	682	694	799	834				
Green	Clodagh Harrington	2.39%	387	399	400	407	414							
Ireland First	Paddy Bullman	2.27%	368	433	433	461	514	518						
The Irish People	James-Peter O'Sullivan	1.30%	211	224	226	239								
Independent	Michelle Neville	0.91%	147	218	219									
Electorate: 36,345 Valid: 16,200 Spoilt: 157 Quota: 2,026 Turnout: 16,357 (45.00%)

=== Skibbereen–West Cork ===
Skibbereen–West Cork: 5 Seats
Party	Candidate	FPv%	Count									
Party	Candidate	FPv%	1	2	3	4	5	6	7	8	9	10
Fine Gael	Noel O'Donovan	16.10%	2,445	2,469	2,517	2,539						
Fianna Fáil	Joe Carroll	11.74%	1,783	1,804	1,816	1,971	2,063	2,089	2,133	2,274	2,995	
Fine Gael	Brendan McCarthy	9.11%	1,384	1,409	1,424	1,552	1,593	1,619	1,674	1,772		
Fianna Fáil	Deirdre Kelly	8.85%	1,344	1,360	1,403	1,424	1,448	1,462	1,495	1,913	1,996	2,092
Independent Ireland	Daniel Sexton	8.41%	1,277	1,318	1,342	1,378	1,470	1,624	1,775	2,031	2,169	2,238
Social Democrats	Isobel Towse	8.23%	1,249	1,335	1,510	1,559	1,701	1,858	2,017	2,145	2,446	2,566
Fianna Fáil	Padraig O'Reilly	7.90%	1,199	1,208	1,233	1,237	1,255	1,377	1,729	1,806	1,926	2,011
Independent	Declan Hurley	6.88%	1,045	1,081	1,109	1,157	1,200	1,269	1,394			
Independent	Humphrey Deegan	5.62%	853	869	895	927	949	1,068				
Independent	Barry O'Mahony	4.26%	647	665	697	719	771					
Independent	Karen Coakley	3.66%	555	577	595							
Sinn Féin	Donnchadh O'Seaghdha	3.64%	552	574	597	640						
Labour	Evie Nevin	2.96%	450	483								
Green	Rory Jackson	1.41%	214									
Aontú	Lorraine Deane	1.23%	187									
Electorate: 27,132 Valid: 15,184 Spoilt: 115 Quota: 2,531 Turnout: 15,299 (56.39%)

== Changes ==
=== Co-options ===
Party	Outgoing	LEA	Reason	Date	Co-optee
Labour	Eoghan Kenny	Mallow	Elected to 34th Dáil at the 2024 general election	20 December 2024	Ronan Sheehan
Fianna Fáil	Séamus McGrath	Carrigaline	Elected to 34th Dáil at the 2024 general election	20 December 2024	Patrick Donovan
Fine Gael	Noel McCarthy	Fermoy	Elected to 34th Dáil at the 2024 general election	20 December 2024	Kay Dawson
Fine Gael	John Paul O'Shea	Kanturk	Elected to 34th Dáil at the 2024 general election	20 December 2024	Aileen Browne
Social Democrats	Liam Quaide	Midleton	Elected to 34th Dáil at the 2024 general election	20 December 2024	Eamonn Horgan
Fine Gael	Eileen Lynch	Macroom	Elected to the 27th Seanad at the 2025 Seanad election	21 April 2025	Kate Lynch
Fine Gael	Noel O'Donovan	Skibbereen–West Cork	Nominated to the 27th Seanad	21 April 2025	Brendan McCarthy
Fianna Fáil	Patrick Gerard Murphy	Bantry–West Cork	Death of councillor	13 September 2025	George Gill
Fine Gael	Michael Creed	Macroom	Death of councillor	3 June 2026	Gerry Healy
Fianna Fáil	Joe Carroll	Skibbereen–West Cork	Death of Councillor	3 June 2026	Alan Dromey

=== Changes in affiliation ===
Name	LEA	Elected as	New affiliation	Date
Peter O'Donoghue	Fermoy	Independent	Aontú	14 January 2026
