= John Haydn =

Anglican priest

John Armour Haydn (5 March 1845 – 21 May 1920) was an Anglican priest in Ireland in the second half of the 19th Century and the first decades of the 20th.

Haydn was born in Tallow, County Waterford. He was educated at Trinity College, Dublin and ordained deacon in 1868, and priest in 1869. After a curacy at St Michael, Limerick he held incumbencies at Chapelrussell and Nantenan. He was Archdeacon of Limerick from 1913 until 1918. He died in Limerick, aged 75.
