= Joanne Collins =

Irish politician

Senator Joanne Collins
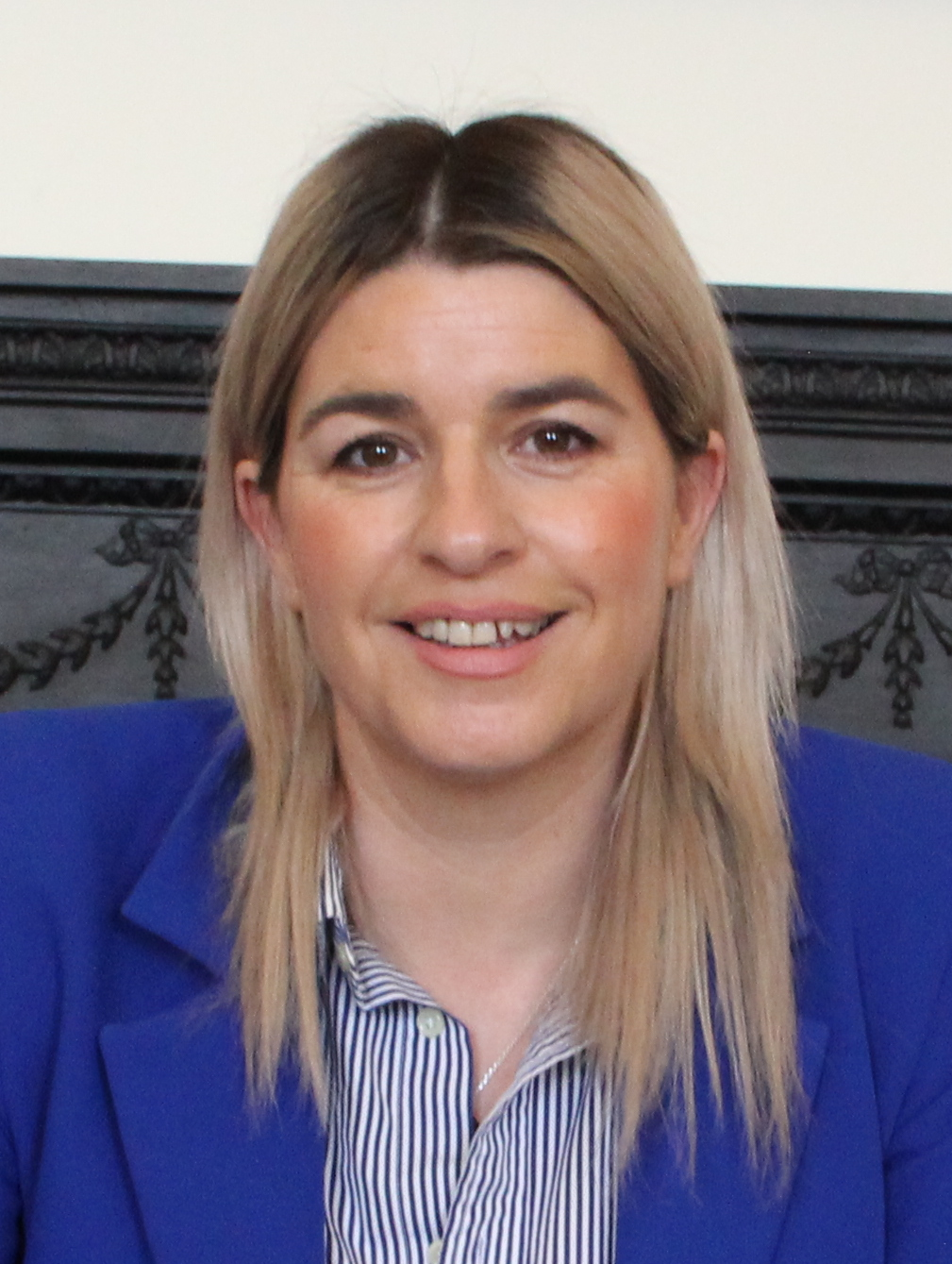
- Collins in 2025

Senator
- Incumbent
- Assumed office January 2025
- Constituency: Agricultural Panel

Personal details
- Born: Cappamore, County Limerick, Ireland
- Party: Sinn Féin
- Children: 4

Joanne Collins is an Irish Sinn Féin politician who has been a senator for the Agricultural Panel since January 2025.

== Personal life ==
She is a qualified Special needs assistant, and lives in Cappagh, County Limerick with her husband and their four children.

== Political career ==
She unsuccessfully contested the 2024 general election for the Limerick County constituency. She was also an unsuccessful candidate at the 2024 Limerick City and County Council election for the Adare–Rathkeale area.
