= Noel O'Donovan =

Noel O'Donovan may refer to:

- Noel O'Donovan (actor)
- Noel O'Donovan (politician)
