= 2025 Seanad election =

Election to the 27th Seanad

- 29–30 January 2025

60 members of the Seanad Éireann 31 seats needed for a majority
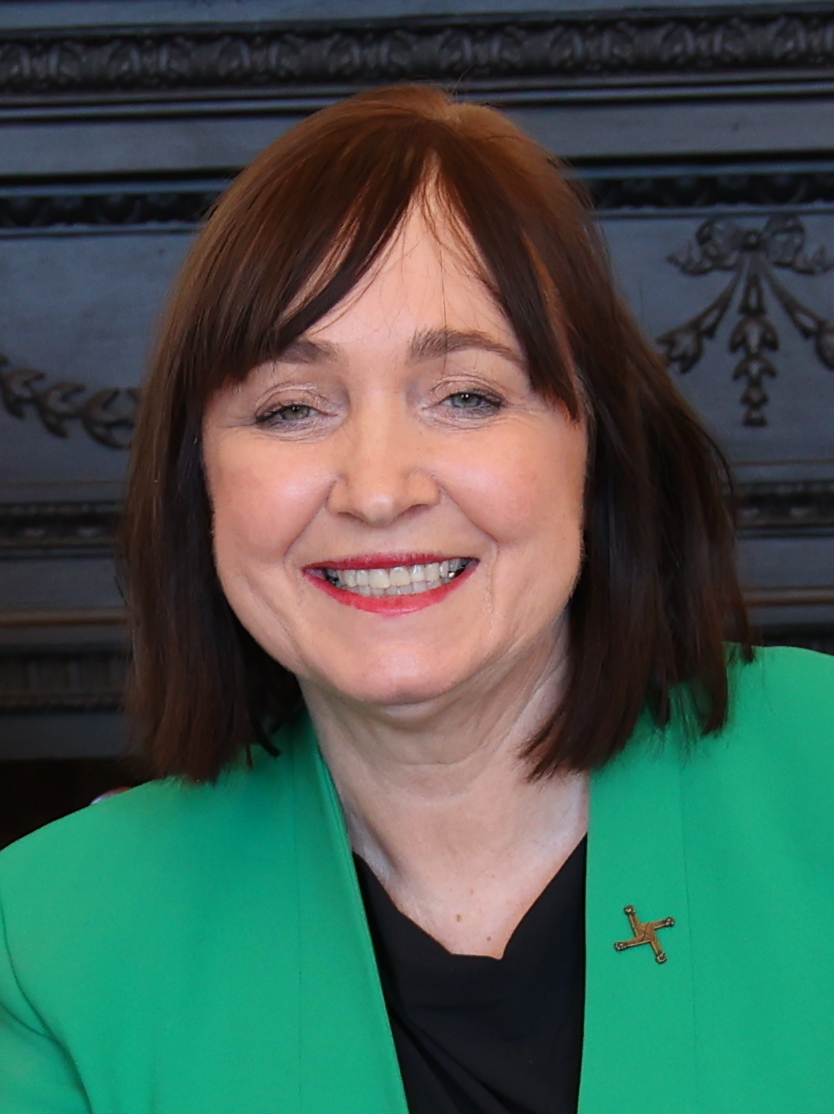

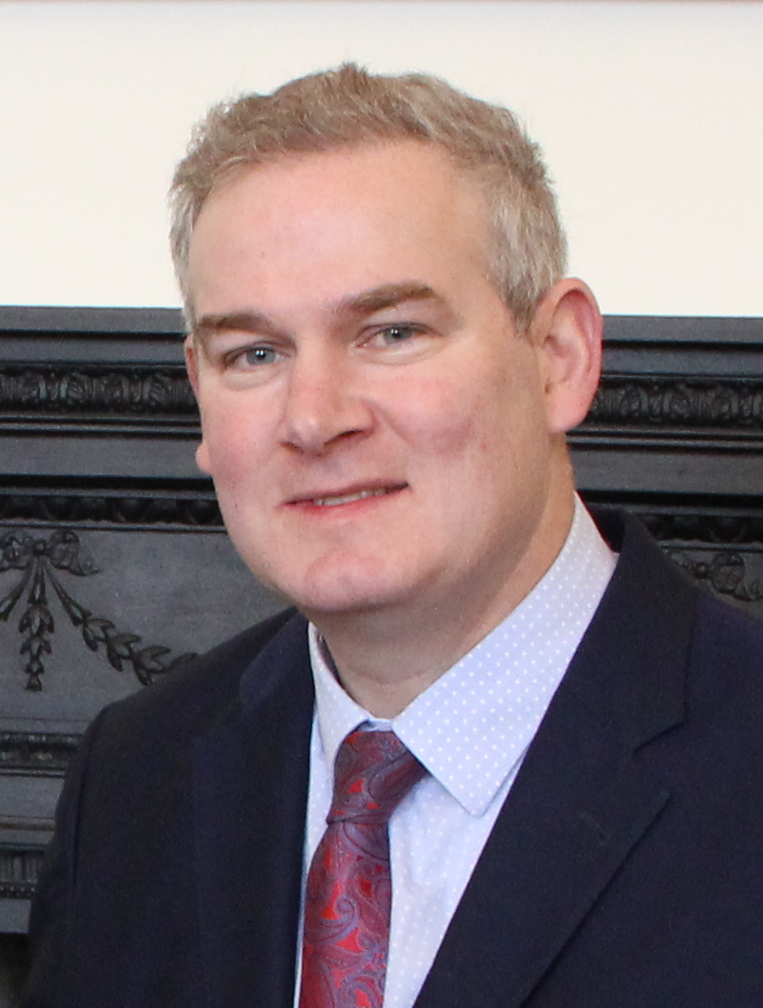

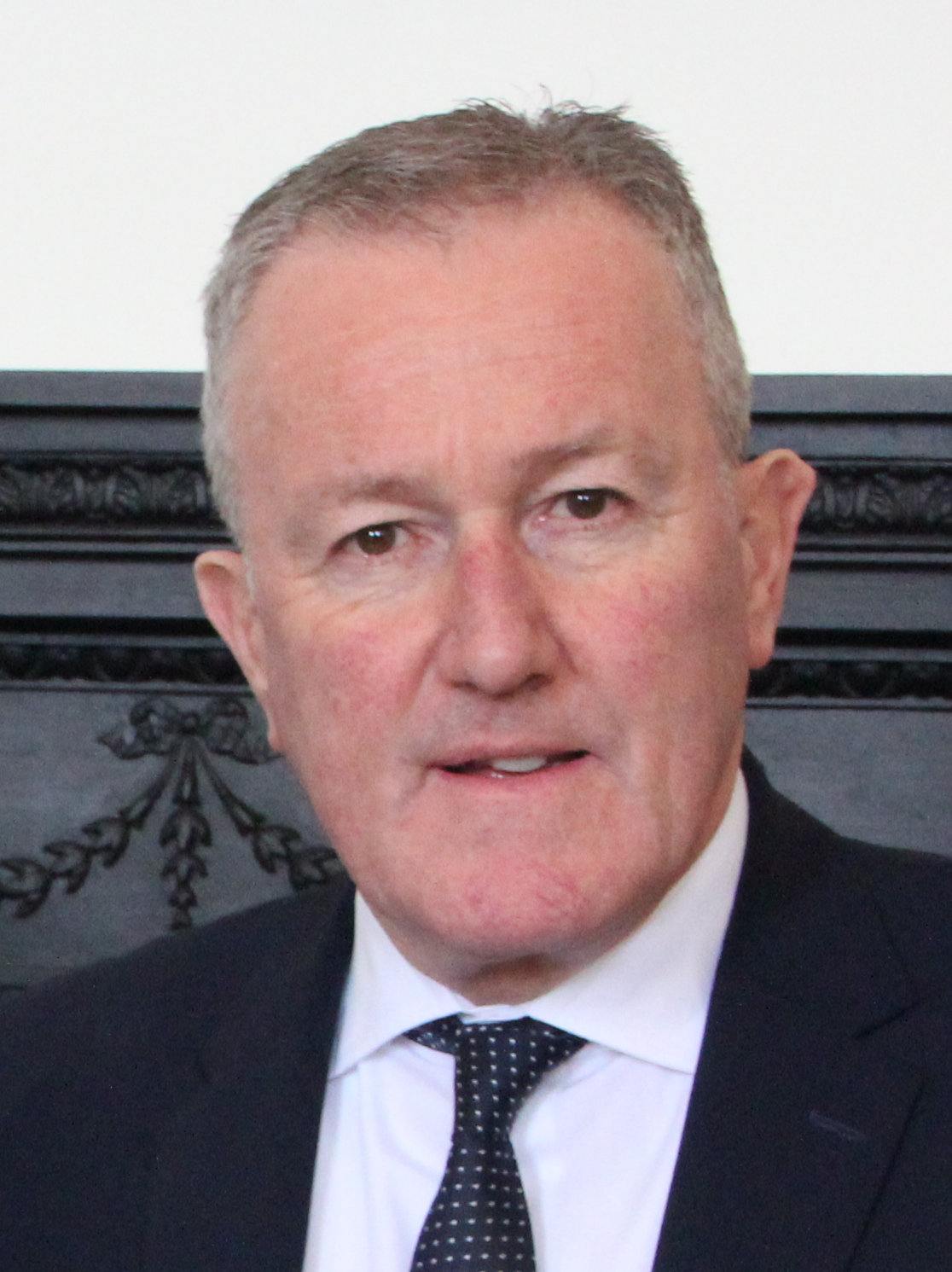

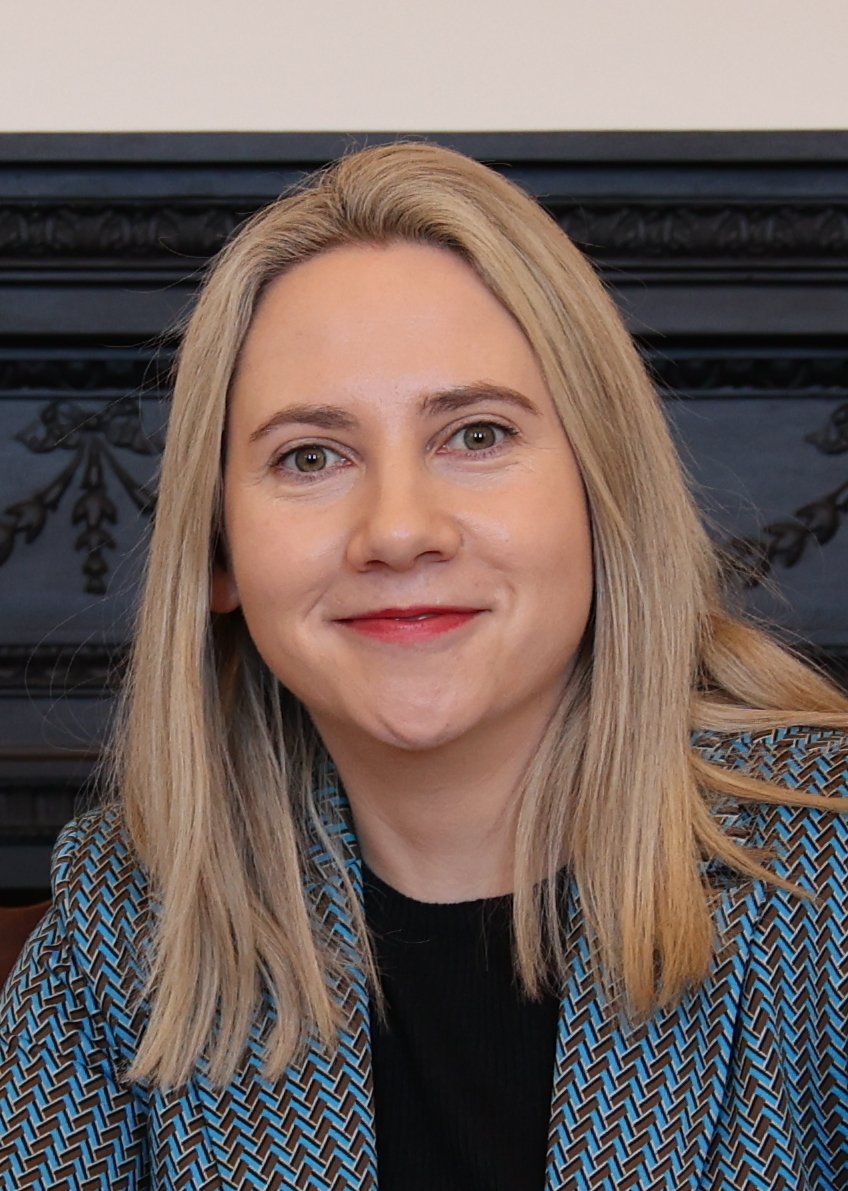

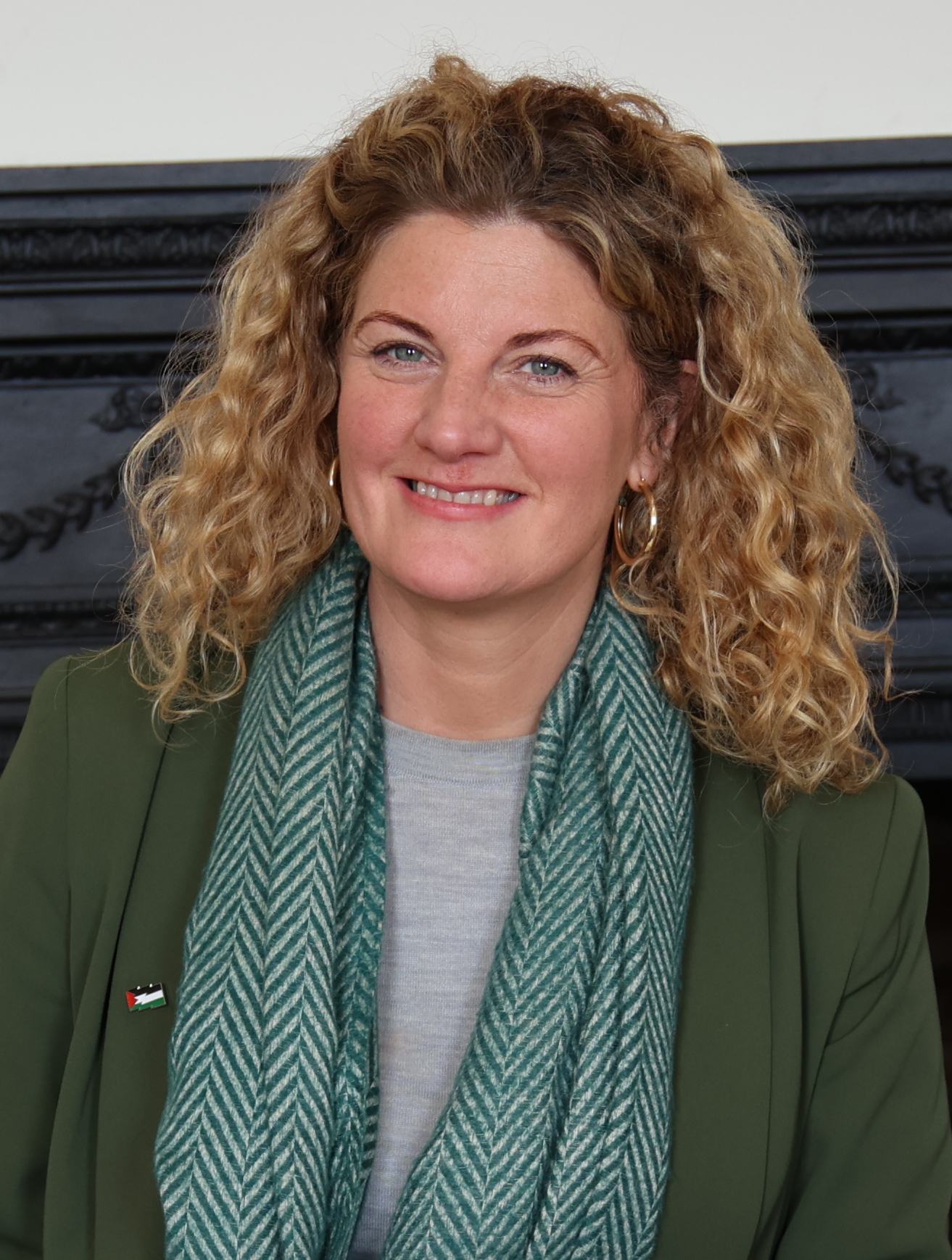

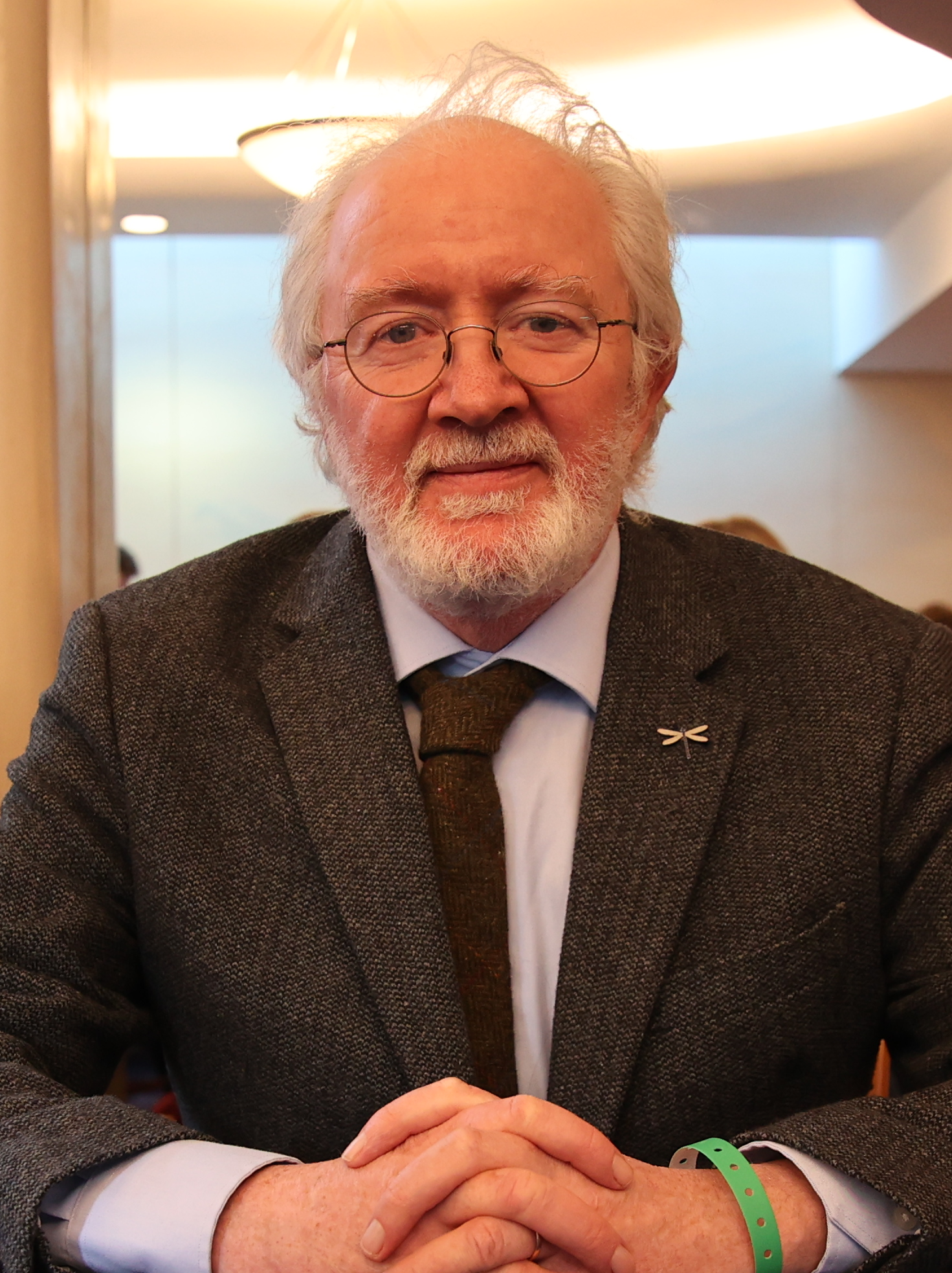

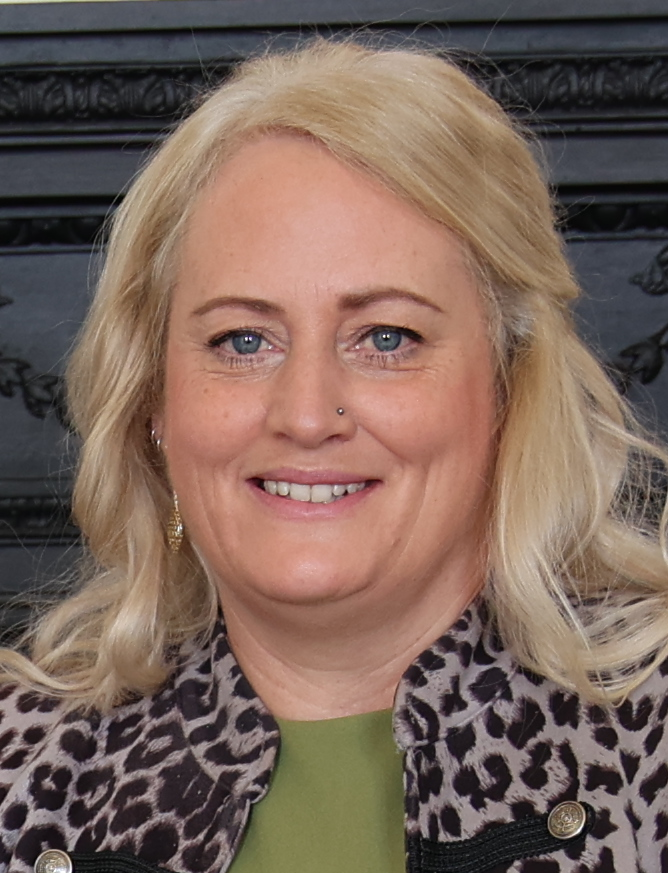

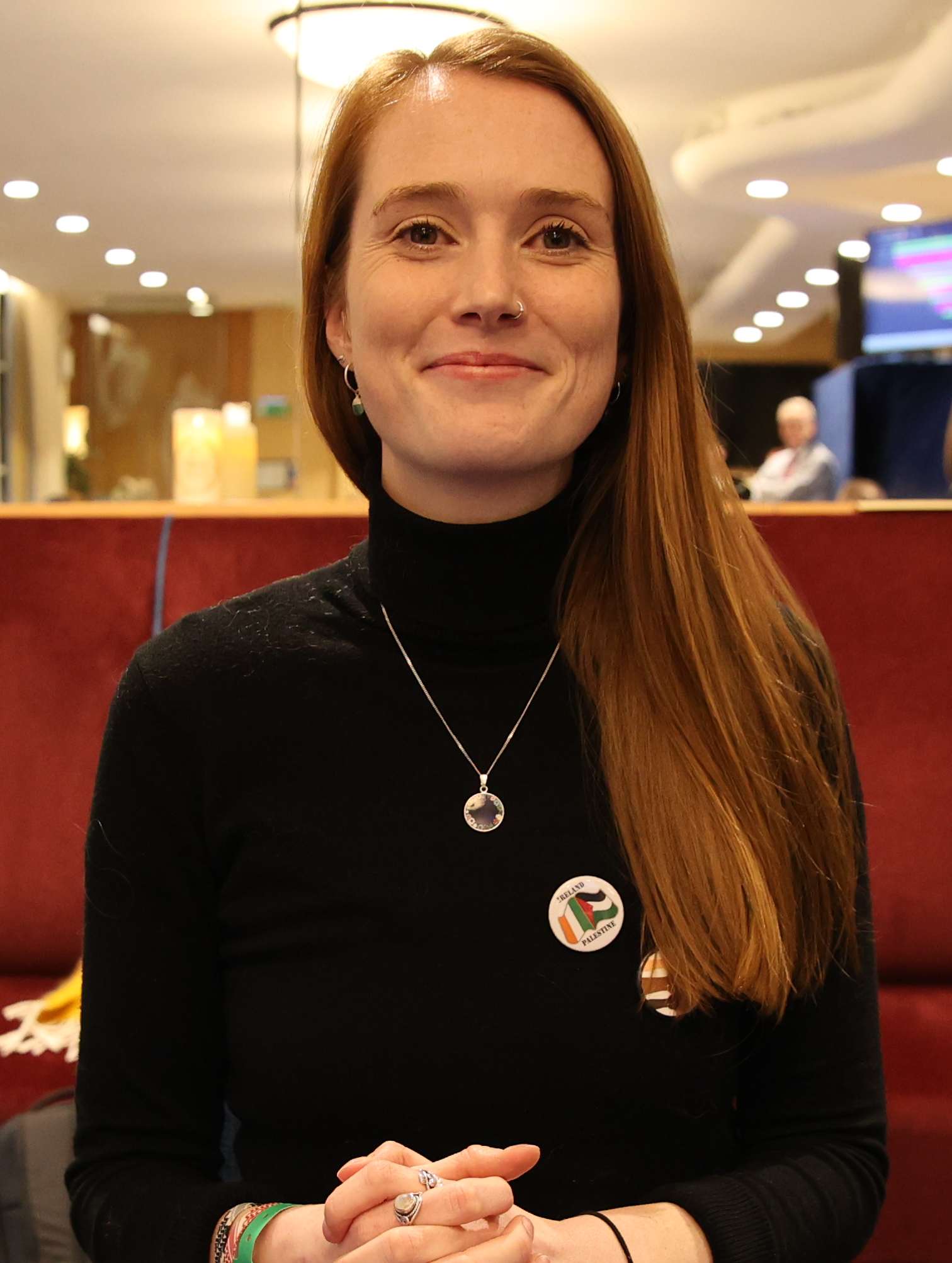
	First party	Second party	Third party
Leader	Fiona O'Loughlin	Seán Kyne	Conor Murphy
Party	Fianna Fáil	Fine Gael	Sinn Féin
Leader's seat	Administrative Panel	Cultural and Educational Panel	Industrial and Commercial Panel
Last election	20 seats	16 seats	5 seats
Seats before	18	12	2
Seats after	19	18	6
Seat change	▼1	▲2	▲1
	Fourth party	Fifth party	Sixth party
Leader	Laura Harmon & Nessa Cosgrove	Malcolm Noonan	Sarah O'Reilly
Party	Labour	Green	Aontú
Leader's seat		Agricultural Panel	Agricultural Panel
Last election	5 seats	4 seats	0 seats
Seats before	2	5	0
Seats after	2	1	1
Seat change	▼3	▼3	▲1
	Seventh party
Leader	Patricia Stephenson
Party	Social Democrats
Leader's seat	Labour Panel
Last election	0 seats
Seats before	0
Seats after	1
Seat change	▲1
Leader of the Seanad before election
Lisa Chambers
Fianna Fáil
Elected Leader of the Seanad
Seán Kyne
Fine Gael

An indirect election to the 27th Seanad took place in January 2025, following the 2024 general election to the 34th Dáil in November 2024. Seanad Éireann is the upper house of the Oireachtas, with Dáil Éireann as its lower house. Polls closed for six senators elected in two university constituencies on 29 January and for 43 senators elected on five vocational panels on 30 January; the remaining 11 senators were nominated by the Taoiseach, Micheál Martin.

The election saw senators from Aontú and the Social Democrats elected for the first time. (Note: Senator James Heffernan joined the Social Democrats in September 2015; he had been elected as a Labour candidate in 2011 and lost the whip in 2012. Heffernan was a Social Democrat Senator for nine months until the 24th Seanad was dissolved in June 2016, but was never elected as a Social Democrat candidate.)

== Background ==
The Constitution of Ireland provides that a Seanad election must take place within 90 days of the dissolution of the Dáil Éireann. The 33rd Dáil was dissolved on 8 November 2024. On 15 November 2024, the Minister for Housing, Local Government and Heritage, Darragh O'Brien, signed an order for the Seanad elections, providing 29 January as the deadline for ballots in the university constituencies and 30 January as the deadline for ballots for the vocational panels.

== Electoral system ==
There are 60 seats in the Seanad, each elected via one of three methods: direct election via voters who are university graduates, indirect election via a body of other previously elected politicians, or appointment by the Taoiseach.

All votes are cast by postal ballot, and are counted using the single transferable vote. Under this system, voters can rank candidates in order of their preference (1 as their first preference, 2 for second preference, and so on). In counting votes for the vocational panels, ballots are initially given a value of 1,000 to allow calculation of quotas where all ballots are distributed in the case of a surplus, rather than taking a representative sample as is done in counting votes for the university constituencies or Dáil elections. The quota for election is given as:

$\left( \frac{\text{total valid poll}}{ \text{seats}+1 } \right) + 1$.

=== University constituencies ===
Six senators are directly elected from two university constituencies: three from the National University constituency and three from the Dublin University (Trinity College Dublin) constituency. This was the last general election from these constituencies: under the Seanad Electoral (University Members) (Amendment) Act 2024, at the next Seanad general election held after 21 March 2025, the two university constituencies will be replaced by a new six-seat Higher Education constituency. This legislation was enacted in response to the judgment of the Supreme Court in Heneghan v Minister for Housing, Planning and Local Government (2023).

=== Vocational panels ===
Forty-three senators are indirectly elected by an electorate of elected politicians, consisting of members of the incoming 34th Dáil, members of the outgoing 26th Seanad, and incumbent city and county councillors, who have ballots for each of the five vocational panels. There are 1,172 electors for the election of panel members. The clerk of the Seanad is ex officio the returning officer for the panel elections and maintains the register of nominating bodies for each panel. Candidates may be nominated by nominating bodies (outside sub-panel) or by members of the Oireachtas (inside sub-panel). In each vocational panel, there is a minimum number who must be elected from either the inside or the outside sub-panel. If the number of candidates nominated for each sub-panel does not exceed by two the maximum number which may be elected from that sub-panel, the Taoiseach shall nominate candidates to fill the deficiency.

Electors for the panels elect:

- Seven seats from the Administrative Panel, with a minimum of three from inside and outside sub-panels: Public administration and social services (including the voluntary sector).
- Eleven seats from the Agricultural Panel, with a minimum of four: Agriculture and the fisheries.
- Five seats from the Cultural and Educational Panel, with a minimum of two: Education, the arts, the Irish language and Irish culture and literature.
- Nine seats from the Industrial and Commercial Panel, with a minimum of three: Industry and commerce (including engineering and architecture).
- Eleven seats from the Labour Panel, with a minimum of four: Labour (organised or otherwise).

=== Appointment ===
The 11 nominated senators are appointed by the Taoiseach. Under the agreement that formed their government, six senators were chosen by Taoiseach Micheál Martin and five were chosen by Tánaiste Simon Harris.

== Campaign ==
On 18 December, it was reported that outgoing Green Party senators Róisín Garvey and Vincent P. Martin, as well as Sinn Féin's Fintan Warfield would not be contesting the elections for the new Seanad. Green Party Minister of State and senator Pippa Hackett and Fine Gael's John McGahon said they would be taking a step back from politics. A fourth Green Party senator Pauline O'Reilly also confirmed she would not be returning to the Seanad. Despite initially ruling himself out of a continued career in politics, Fine Gael senator Seán Kyne later confirmed he would contest the election.

== Members of the outgoing Seanad not seeking election ==
Date confirmed	Constituency	Departing senator	Party	Reason
4 September 2024	Labour Panel	Shane Cassells	Fianna Fáil	Retirement
30 November 2024	Industrial and Commercial Panel	Catherine Ardagh	Fianna Fáil	Elected to 34th Dáil
30 November 2024	Labour Panel	Jerry Buttimer	Fine Gael	Elected to 34th Dáil
30 November 2024	Cultural and Educational Panel	Malcolm Byrne	Fianna Fáil	Elected to 34th Dáil
30 November 2024	Industrial and Commercial Panel	Micheál Carrigy	Fine Gael	Elected to 34th Dáil
30 November 2024	Labour Panel	John Cummins	Fine Gael	Elected to 34th Dáil
30 November 2024	Nominated by the Taoiseach	Emer Currie	Fine Gael	Elected to 34th Dáil
30 November 2024	Nominated by the Taoiseach	Timmy Dooley	Fianna Fáil	Elected to 34th Dáil
30 November 2024	Nominated by the Taoiseach	Erin McGreehan	Fianna Fáil	Elected to 34th Dáil
30 November 2024	Labour Panel	Marie Sherlock	Labour	Elected to 34th Dáil
30 November 2024	Industrial and Commercial Panel	Mark Wall	Labour	Elected to 34th Dáil
30 November 2024	Industrial and Commercial Panel	Barry Ward	Fine Gael	Elected to 34th Dáil
18 December 2024	Nominated by the Taoiseach	Róisín Garvey	Green	Retirement
18 December 2024	Agricultural Panel	Pippa Hackett	Green	Retirement
18 December 2024	Cultural and Educational Panel	John McGahon	Fine Gael	Retirement
18 December 2024	Nominated by the Taoiseach	Vincent P. Martin	Green	Retirement
18 December 2024	Labour Panel	Pauline O'Reilly	Green	Retirement
18 December 2024	Cultural and Educational Panel	Fintan Warfield	Sinn Féin	Retirement
24 December 2024	Agricultural Panel	Paddy Burke	Fine Gael	Retirement
31 December 2024	Administrative Panel	Rebecca Moynihan	Labour	Retirement
31 December 2024	Agricultural Panel	Annie Hoey	Labour	Retirement
31 December 2024	Administrative Panel	Mal O'Hara	Green	Retirement
31 December 2024	Agricultural Panel	Denis O'Donovan	Fianna Fáil	Retirement
2 January 2025	Labour Panel	Ned O'Sullivan	Fianna Fáil	Retirement
7 January 2025	Cultural and Educational Panel	Lisa Chambers	Fianna Fáil	Retirement

== Election process ==
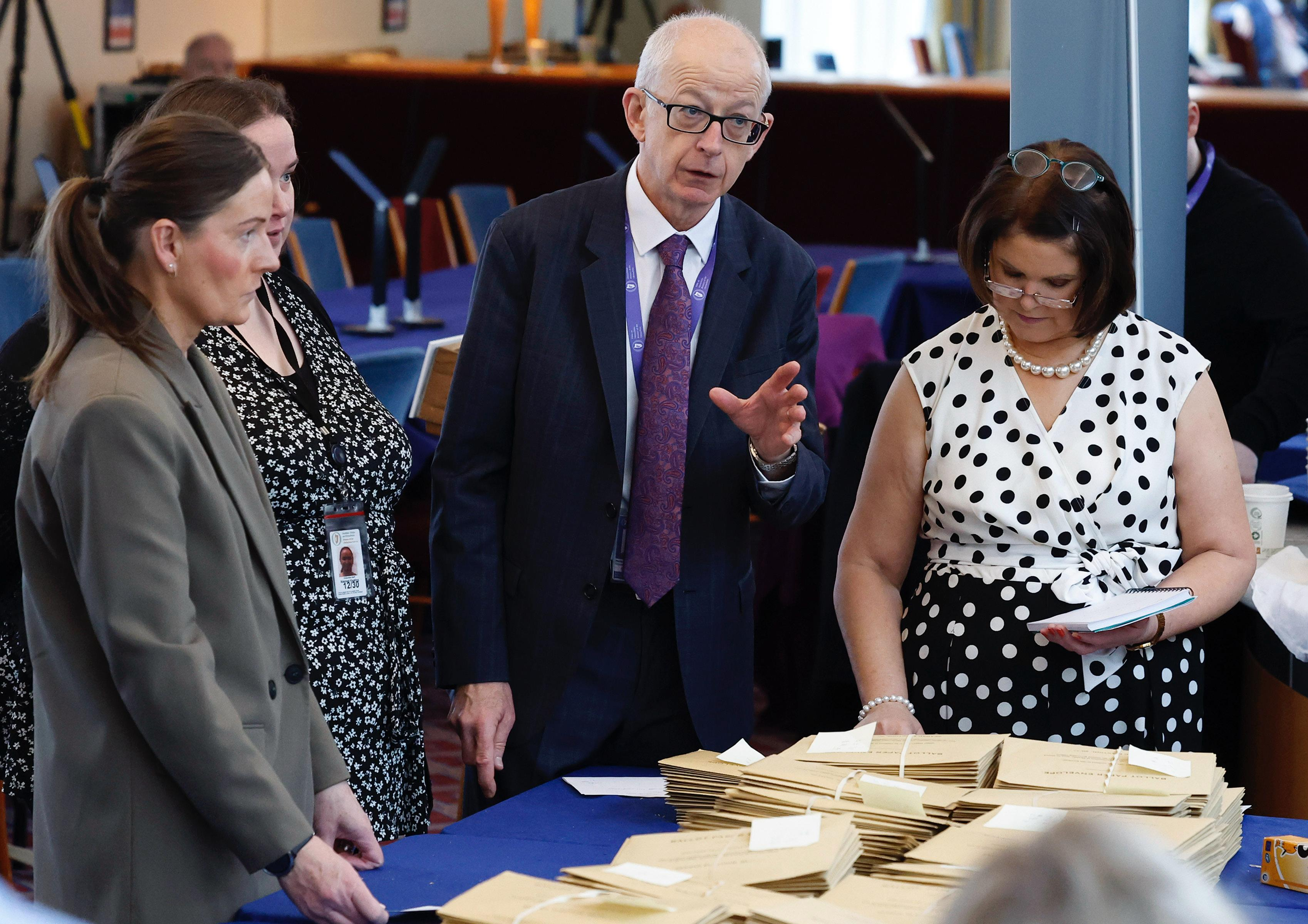
Martin Groves, Clerk of Seanad Éireann, overseeing the counting of ballots

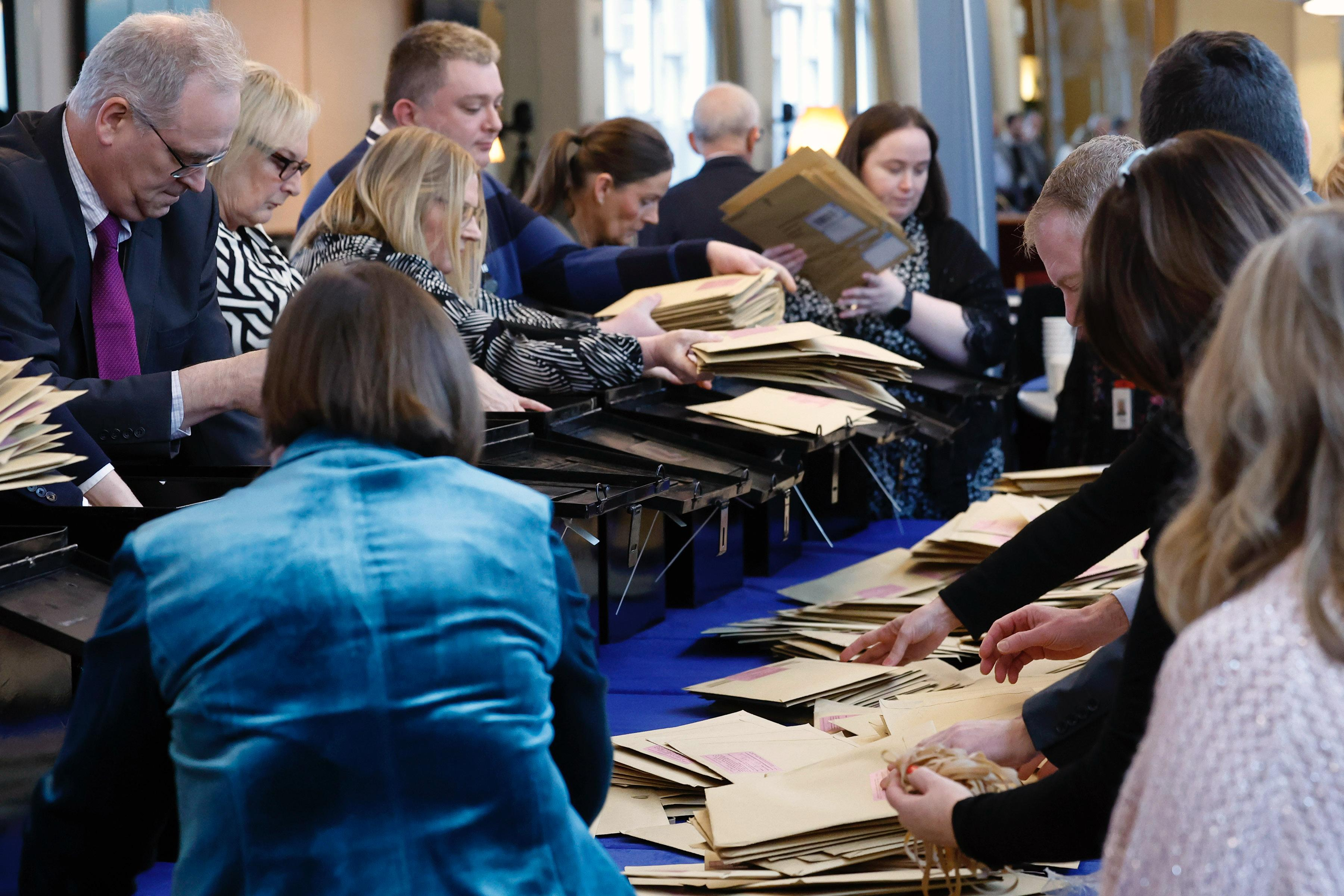
Ballots being counted

Timetable of 2025 Seanad election
Deadline	Universities	Vocational Panel
Nominations close	6 December 2024	18 December 2024 ("outside" panel: nominating bodies — civic society groups); 31 December 2024 ("inside" panel: Oireachtas members)
Completion of panels	—N/a	8 January 2025
Ballot papers distributed	30 December 2024	15 January 2025
Polls close	29 January 2025, 11 a.m.	30 January 2025, 11 a.m.

== Results ==
Election to the 27th Seanad: 29–30 January 2025
Party	Cand. (Note: No party labels appear on ballots for Seanad elections. Party membership is indicated below. Does not include nominated members of Seanad Éireann.)	Seats			
Party	Cand.	2020	Out.	Elected 2025	Change
Fianna Fáil	37	20	18	19	▼1
Fine Gael	35	16	12	18	▲2
Sinn Féin	8	5	2	6	▲1
Labour	5	5	2	2	▼3
Green	4	4	5	1	▼3
Social Democrats	3	0	0	1	▲1
Aontú	1	0	0	1	▲1
Independent Ireland	1	0	0	0	Steady
Independent	47	10	11	12	▲2
Vacant	—N/a		10	—N/a	Steady
Total	141	60			Steady
Source: Oireachtas website

To facilitate the transfer of fractional surpluses, each valid ballot paper for the vocational panels is given a value of 1,000.

=== National University of Ireland ===
National University of Ireland: 3 seats
Party	Candidate	FPv%	Count							
Party	Candidate	FPv%	1	2	3	4	5	6	7	8
Independent	Michael McDowell	31.5	11,390							
Independent	Rónán Mullen	20.6	7,452	8,175	8,259	8,376	8,461	8,643	8,783	9,107
Independent	Alice-Mary Higgins	19.0	6,872	7,350	7,411	7,497	7,560	7,761	7,809	8,822
Green	Eva Dowling	9.0	3,239	3,413	3,445	3,496	3,553	3,647	3,740	4,226
Independent	Rónán Collins	7.2	2,604	2,972	3,031	3,062	3,193	3,303	3,700	4,357
Independent	Linda O'Shea Farren	2.8	1,023	1,174	1,200	1,231	1,293	1,355	1,417	
Independent	Marie Keenan	2.8	1,009	1,108	1,124	1,171	1,206	1,282	1,360	
Independent	Dara Kilmartin	1.9	703	844	863	883	964	1,010		
Independent	Sandra Adams	1.7	597	669	680	715	754			
Independent	Michael O'Doherty	1.2	446	538	559	591				
Independent	Mairead Kenny	1.2	417	455	489					
Independent	Hilary Beirne	1.0	362	387						
Electorate: 112,832 Valid: 36,114 Spoilt: 37 Quota: 9,029 Turnout: 36,151 (32.0%)

=== Dublin University ===
Dublin University: 3 seats
Party	Candidate	FPv%	Count														
Party	Candidate	FPv%	1	2	3	4	5	6	7	8	9	10	11	12	13	14	15
Independent	Lynn Ruane	21.1	3,761	3,769	3,781	3,792	3,803	3,900	3,974	4,042	4,102	4,399	4,806				
Independent	Tom Clonan	19.5	3,473	3,482	3,492	3,503	3,534	3,578	3,626	3,743	3,931	4,090	4,269	4,346	4,938		
Independent	Aubrey McCarthy	10.2	1,814	1,818	1,823	1,839	1,874	1,896	1,926	1,996	2,115	2,205	2,314	2,343	2,630	2,747	3,770
Independent	Hugo MacNeill	9.5	1,684	1,687	1,696	1,721	1,757	1,764	1,792	1,870	1,957	2,057	2,116	2,141	2,359	2,476	
Green	Hazel Chu	8.1	1,450	1,453	1,462	1,471	1,480	1,515	1,573	1,627	1,649	1,803	2,062	2,201	2,962	3,163	3,706
Green	Ossian Smyth	7.8	1,380	1,382	1,385	1,393	1,401	1,419	1,439	1,509	1,524	1,641	1,945	2,029			
Labour	Sadhbh O'Neill	6.1	1,085	1,086	1,088	1,095	1,106	1,161	1,196	1,249	1,305	1,384					
Independent	Katherine Zappone	5.3	950	951	955	956	959	970	1,001	1,018	1,039						
Independent	Laoise De Brún	3.3	593	595	598	604	616	621	640	668							
Independent	Kevin Byrne	2.8	495	500	516	528	557	564	582								
Independent	Ade Oluborode	1.9	339	343	349	363	365	372									
Social Democrats	Paul Mulville	1.7	305	306	309	314	319										
Independent	Marcus Matthews	1.0	186	188	189	198											
Independent	Jack Mulcahy	0.8	140	144	145												
Independent	Derek Byrne	0.5	87	90													
Independent	Abbas Ali O'Shea	0.3	55														
Electorate: 70,000 Valid: 17,797 Spoilt: 24 Quota: 4,450 Turnout: 17,821 (25.5%)

=== Administrative Panel ===
Administrative Panel: 7 seats
Party	Candidate	FPv%	Count													
Party	Candidate	FPv%	1	2	3	4	5	6	7	8	9	10	11	12	13	14
Fianna Fáil	Mark Daly	14.7	169,000													
Sinn Féin	Nicole Ryan	12.2	140,000	140,000	140,000	140,000	140,000	140,000	140,000	140,000	140,000	140,000	140,000	140,000	144,000	
Independent	Eileen Flynn	10.0	115,000	115,302	116,302	121,302	122,453	123,453	130,755	130,755	130,755	130,755	133,755	133,755	153,755	
Fianna Fáil	Fiona O'Loughlin	8.6	99,000	113,647	114,647	114,798	126,251	126,251	129,402	130,402	132,402	132,402	133,402	133,402	142,704	144,262
Labour	Darragh Moriarty	7.8	90,000	90,302	90,302	92,302	92,302	92,302	93,302	93,302	94,302	96,453	96,453	96,978	104,035	107,151
Fianna Fáil	Diarmuid Wilson	7.7	89,000	92,775	93,775	94,775	102,077	102,077	108,077	108,077	108,228	113,228	115,228	115,228	134,983	140,436
Fine Gael	Garret Ahearn	7.1	82,000	82,151	82,151	82,151	82,151	88,151	90,151	103,151	120,151	144,151				
Fine Gael	Martin Conway	6.9	79,000	79,302	81,302	81,302	81,302	84,302	86,302	97,302	111,302	152,453				
Independent	Richie Molloy	4.8	55,000	57,718	60,718	64,718	66,718	69,718	79,020	86,171	86,171	87,171	88,171	88,171		
Fine Gael	Vicki Casserly	4.0	46,000	46,151	46,151	47,151	48,151	53,151	55,302	61,302	78,302					
Fine Gael	Noel O'Donovan	3.6	41,000	41,151	42,151	43,151	43,151	46,151	46,151	52,151						
Fine Gael	Niamh Madden	2.9	33,000	33,000	34,000	36,000	36,000	43,000	45,151							
Independent	Ann Marie Flanagan	2.3	26,000	27,359	32,359	36,510	36,510	36,510								
Fine Gael	Conor Bergin	2.2	25,000	25,000	27,000	28,000	28,000									
Fianna Fáil	Justin Moylan	1.9	22,000	22,755	22,906	22,906										
Independent	Joan Carthy	1.8	21,000	21,302	21,302											
Independent	Cathal Berry	1.5	17,000	17,302												
Electorate: 1,164 Valid: 1,150 Spoilt: 14 Quota: 143,626

=== Agricultural Panel ===
Agricultural Panel: 11 seats
Party	Candidate	FPv%	Count																							
Party	Candidate	FPv%	1	2	3	4	5	6	7	8	9	10	11	12	13	14	15	16	17	18	19	20	21	22	23	24
Green	Malcolm Noonan	9.3	107,000																							
Sinn Féin	Joanne Collins	9.2	106,000																							
Independent	Victor Boyhan	9.1	105,000																							
Fianna Fáil	Paul Daly	7.2	83,000	83,375	83,375	84,563	84,563	84,563	85,761	86,860	87,985	92,985	92,985	93,084	96,084											
Labour	Angela Feeney	5.3	61,000	69,000	69,324	70,512	70,512	70,512	70,512	71,085	71,184	71,184	71,309	71,309	71,309	71,309	71,309	72,309	72,309	72,309	73,309	74,533	74,533	74,533	78,513	
Aontú	Sarah O'Reilly	5.1	58,000	58,250	58,574	59,366	59,366	59,366	59,366	59,366	60,465	61,465	61,465	62,465	62,465	62,465	63,465	66,465	66,465	75,564	76,564	76,861	76,861	76,861	88,608	96,108
Fine Gael	Paraic Brady	4.9	57,000	57,000	57,000	57,198	57,198	58,198	58,198	58,198	58,297	58,297	62,297	64,297	64,297	64,297	75,297	77,297	78,297	82,297	83,297	86,297	86,297	86,297	92,621	95,871
Independent Ireland	Noel Thomas	4.9	57,000	57,000	66,288	66,882	66,882	66,882	66,882	67,981	68,089	68,089	68,089	68,089	68,188	68,188	68,287	69,412	69,412	69,412	70,412	71,412	71,412	71,412		
Fine Gael	Maria Byrne	4.1	47,000	47,000	47,000	47,198	47,198	47,198	48,198	48,297	48,297	48,297	51,297	54,297	54,405	54,405	61,530	61,629	61,629	71,629	71,629	73,629	73,629	73,629	78,629	94,685
Fine Gael	Eileen Lynch	4.0	46,000	46,125	46,115	46,224	46,224	46,224	46,224	46,224	46,224	46,224	49,224	54,224	57,224	57,502	59,502	59,502	64,502	81,601	82,740	87,740	87,740	87,740	93,064	101,064
Fine Gael	P. J. Murphy	4.0	46,000	46,000	46,000	46,459	46,459	48,459	48,459	50,693	50,693	50,693	54,693	59,693	59,693	59,693	68,792	69,792	70,792	75,792	75,792	78,792	78,792	78,792	83,098	92,076
Fianna Fáil	Teresa Costello	3.3	38,000	38,125	38,125	38,224	38,224	38,224	39,224	39,224	39,224	39,224	39,224	39,224	43,224	43,224	43,224	46,224	56,224	56,224	74,224	96,224				
Fianna Fáil	Niall Blaney	3.2	37,000	37,000	37,000	37,792	37,792	37,891	37,891	40,990	45,990	48,115	48,115	48,115	51,115	51,115	51,115	64,115	71,240	71,240	80,339	96,537				
Fianna Fáil	Pat Fitzpatrick	3.1	36,000	36,125	36,125	36,323	38,323	38,323	40,323	40,745	40,745	41,745	42,745	42,745	45,745	45,745	45,745	46,844	55,844	55,943	67,943					
Fine Gael	Tim Lombard	3.0	35,000	35,000	35,000	35,198	35,198	36,198	36,198	36,297	36,297	36,297	40,396	44,396	44,396	44,396	45,396	45,396	45,396							
Fianna Fáil	Paddy O'Rourke	2.3	27,000	27,250	27,250	27,646	27,646	27,646	27,646	27,646	30,646	30,646	30,646	30,646	32,646	32,646	32,646									
Fianna Fáil	Gillian Coughlan	2.2	26,000	26,375	26,483	26,582	27,582	27,582	27,582	27,582	27,582	28,582	28,806	28,806												
Fianna Fáil	Imelda Goldsboro	2.2	26,000	26,125	26,125	26,224	26,224	26,224	27,224	27,224	29,224	35,224	35,224	35,224	38,224	38,224	38,224	42,224	46,363	46,383						
Fine Gael	Tim Durkan	1.9	22,000	22,250	22,250	22,448	22,448	22,448	22,448	22,448	22,448															
Fianna Fáil	Niall Kelleher	1.8	21,000	21,000	21,000	21,000	23,000	23,000	28,000	28,207	28,207	31,207	31,207	31,207	38,207	38,346	38,346	39,471								
Fine Gael	John McNulty	1.7	20,000	20,000	20,000	20,099	20,099	23,099	23,099	23,099	23,099	23,099	24,099													
Fine Gael	Aisling Dolan	1.6	19,000	19,000	19,000	19,000	19,000	21,000	21,000	22,099	25,099	25,224	27,224	31,224	31,573	31,573										
Fianna Fáil	Cillian Keane	1.5	18,000	18,375	18,375	18,375	18,375	18,375	18,375	18,474	19,474															
Independent	Eugene Murphy	1.4	16,000	16,250	16,358	16,556	16,556	16,556	16,556	17,655																
Fianna Fáil	Breandán Fitzgerald	0.9	11,000	11,000	11,108	11,308	11,308	11,308																		
Independent	Matt Dempsey	0.8	9,000	9,625	9,625	11,506	11,506	11,506	11,614																	
Fine Gael	Gerry McMunn	0.8	9,000	9,000	9,000	9,099	9,099																			
Fianna Fáil	Michael D. O'Shea	0.4	5,000	5,000	5,000	5,000																				
Electorate: 1,172 Valid: 1,148,000 Spoilt: 2 Quota: 95,667 Turnout: 98.12%

Returning officer Martin Groves ordered a partial recount (of the 23rd count) because of the narrow margin of victory of Maria Byrne over Angela Feeney (116 notional votes, corresponding to one-ninth of a physical ballot). Feeney sued Groves in the High Court when he refused a full recount (from the first count). The case was heard in July 2025.

=== Cultural and Educational Panel ===
Cultural and Educational Panel: 5 seats
Party	Candidate	FPv%	Count																		
Party	Candidate	FPv%	1	2	3	4	5	6	7	8	9	10	11	12	13	14	15	16	17	18	19
Sinn Féin	Pauline Tully	16.5	189,000	189,000	189,000	190,000	190,000	191,000													
Fine Gael	Cathal Byrne	12.3	141,000	141,000	142,000	142,000	142,000	142,000	142,000	146,000	146,000	155,000	156,000	179,000	179,000	180,000	181,000	214,000			
Fianna Fáil	Shane Curley	6.9	79,000	79,000	79,000	79,000	79,000	79,000	79,000	89,000	89,000	89,000	99,000	99,000	130,000	133,000	142,000	144,000	144,000	184,000	235,000
Fianna Fáil	Lorraine Clifford-Lee	6.6	76,000	76,000	77,000	77,000	78,000	79,000	79,000	81,000	86,000	86,000	99,000	101,000	115,000	119,000	123,000	126,000	126,000	171,000	
Fine Gael	Seán Kyne	6.6	76,000	76,000	76,000	76,000	78,000	78,000	78,000	78,000	79,000	82,000	82,000	100,000	100,000	101,000	108,000	156,000	174,954	180,656	192,656
Independent	Joe Conway	6.5	75,000	75,000	75,000	76,000	81,000	82,000	82,166	82,166	82,166	82,166	84,166	85,166	88,166	111,166	159,166	165,166	168,676	171,676	192,676
Fianna Fáil	Joe Flaherty	6.5	75,000	75,000	75,000	75,000	75,000	75,000	75,000	79,000	81,000	81,000	87,000	89,000	95,000	95,000	97,000	97,000	97,702		
Fine Gael	Shane O'Callaghan	5.9	68,000	68,000	72,000	72,000	72,000	72,000	72,000	72,000	72,000	78,000	80,000	92,000	92,000	92,000	95,000				
Independent	Máirín McGrath	5.5	63,000	63,000	63,000	63,000	64,000	66,000	66,000	66,000	67,000	68,000	69,000	70,000	77,000	89,000					
Fianna Fáil	Mikey Sheehy	4.3	50,000	50,000	50,000	50,000	50,000	50,000	50,000	52,000	53,000	53,000	62,000	62,000							
Independent	Éanna Ní Lamhna	4.2	49,000	49,000	49,000	52,000	53,000	58,000	58,000	58,000	70,000	71,000	71,000	71,000	72,000						
Fine Gael	Carmel Brady	4.1	47,000	47,000	47,000	47,000	47,000	47,000	47,000	47,000	47,000	59,000	59,000								
Fianna Fáil	Gearóid Murphy	3.1	36,000	36,000	36,000	36,000	37,000	37,000	37,000	38,000	43,000	44,000									
Fine Gael	Sharon Tolan	2.8	33,000	33,000	33,000	33,000	33,000	33,000	33,000	33,000	33,000										
Fianna Fáil	Rob Power	2.1	25,000	25,000	25,000	25,000	25,000	25,000	25,000												
Fianna Fáil	Imran Khurshid	1.9	22,000	22,000	22,000	24,000	26,000	26,000	26,000	27,000											
Independent	Liadh Ní Riada	1.2	14,000	14,000	14,000	14,000	14,000														
Independent	Michelle Hayes	1.1	13,000	13,000	13,000	14,000															
Independent	Kensika Monshengwo	0.6	8,000	8,000	8,000																
Fine Gael	Sabina Purcell	0.5	6,000	6,000																	
Independent	Angela Flynn	0	0																		
Electorate: 1,164 Valid: 1,145,000 Spoilt: 14 Quota: 190,834 Turnout: 1,145 (98.4%)

=== Industrial and Commercial Panel ===
Industrial and Commercial Panel: 9 seats
Party	Candidate	FPv%	Count																							
Party	Candidate	FPv%	1	2	3	4	5	6	7	8	9	10	11	12	13	14	15	16	17	18	19	20	21	22	23	24
Independent	Sharon Keogan	9.8	112,000	114,000	114,000	114,000	115,000	114,701																		
Sinn Féin	Conor Murphy	9.8	112,000	112,000	112,000	112,000	112,000	112,000	112,000	112,000	112,000	112,000	112,000	113,000	113,000	113,000	114,000	114,000	114,000	114,000	114,000	114,000	114,000	114,561	114,561	115,561
Independent	Frances Black	8.4	96,000	96,000	97,000	98,000	98,000	98,000	99,000	99,000	99,000	99,000	102,000	104,000	104,000	104,000	105,000	106,000	106,000	106,000	106,000	108,000	113,000	113,561	113,653	151,653
Fianna Fáil	Aidan Davitt	7.8	90,000	90,000	90,000	91,000	91,000	91,000	91,000	94,000	94,000	95,000	98,000	100,000	101,000	106,000	111,000	112,000	117,000							
Labour	Laura Harmon	7.6	87,000	87,000	87,000	87,000	89,000	89,000	89,000	89,000	89,000	89,000	89,000	90,000	90,000	93,000	93,000	93,000	93,000	93,000	93,000	94,000	107,000	112,610	113,622	152,622
Social Democrats	Joan Hopkins	7.2	83,000	83,000	83,000	83,000	83,000	83,000	83,000	83,000	83,000	83,000	84,000	84,000	84,000	85,000	85,000	85,000	86,000	86,000	86,000	87,000	88,000	88,000	88,184	
Fianna Fáil	Ollie Crowe	6.0	69,000	69,000	69,000	69,000	69,000	69,000	70,000	70,000	70,000	70,000	77,000	80,000	80,000	84,000	91,000	91,000	106,000	108,298	108,298	109,298	113,298	113,859	113,859	115,859
Fianna Fáil	Mary Fitzpatrick	4.8	55,000	55,000	56,000	57,000	57,000	57,000	58,000	65,000	65,000	65,000	66,000	66,000	66,000	76,000	89,000	89,000	115,000							
Fine Gael	Garret Kelleher	4.4	51,000	51,000	51,000	51,000	51,000	51,000	51,000	51,000	54,000	60,000	60,000	60,000	63,000	63,000	63,000	75,000	78,000	78,000	78,000	99,000	122,000			
Fine Gael	Danny Byrne	4.3	50,000	50,000	50,000	50,000	50,000	50,000	50,000	50,000	52,000	54,000	54,000	55,000	58,000	58,000	60,000	67,000	67,000	67,000	67,000	82,000				
Fine Gael	Linda Nelson Murray	4.0	46,000	46,000	46,000	46,000	46,000	46,000	46,000	46,000	52,000	56,000	56,000	56,000	62,000	64,000	64,000	73,000	73,000	73,000	73,000	95,000	116,000			
Fine Gael	Declan Burgess	3.9	45,000	45,000	45,000	45,000	45,000	45,000	46,000	46,000	49,000	50,000	50,000	50,000	58,000	58,000	58,000	67,000	67,000	67,000	67,000					
Fianna Fáil	Dee Ryan	3.0	34,000	34,000	34,000	35,000	35,000	35,000	37,000	39,000	39,000	39,000	42,000	45,000	45,000	49,000	52,000	52,000								
Fianna Fáil	Gerry Horkan	2.7	31,000	31,000	31,000	31,000	31,000	31,000	31,000	32,000	32,000	32,000	32,000	33,000	33,000	34,000										
Fine Gael	David Fitzgerald	2.5	29,000	29,000	29,000	29,000	29,000	29,000	30,000	30,000	31,000	31,000	31,000	35,000	39,000	39,000	40,000									
Fianna Fáil	Kate Feeney	2.4	27,000	27,000	27,000	27,000	27,000	27,000	27,000	28,000	29,000	29,000	31,000	32,000	32,000											
Fine Gael	Alan Farrell	1.7	20,000	20,000	20,000	20,000	20,000	20,000	20,000	20,000	21,000	25,000	25,000	25,000												
Fianna Fáil	Michael Naughton	1.7	20,000	20,000	20,000	20,000	20,000	20,000	20,000	20,000	20,000	20,000														
Independent	Matt Shanahan	1.7	20,000	20,000	20,000	20,000	21,000	21,000	22,299	22,299	22,299	22,299	22,299													
Fine Gael	Tony Mulcahy	1.6	18,000	18,000	18,000	18,000	18,000	18,000	18,000	18,000	18,000															
Fine Gael	Mary Seery Kearney	1.5	17,000	17,000	17,000	17,000	18,000	18,000	18,000	18,000																
Fianna Fáil	Sinéad Lucey Brennan	1.2	14,000	14,000	14,000	14,000	14,000	14,000	14,000																	
Independent	Adrian Cummins	0.7	8,000	8,000	8,000	8,000	8,000	8,299																		
Independent	Joe Kelly	0.4	5,000	5,000	5,000	5,000																				
Fianna Fáil	David Pratt	0.3	4,000	4,000	4,000																					
Independent	Vanessa Foran	0.2	2,000	2,000																						
Independent	Donal Kissane	0.2	2,000																							
Electorate: 1,172 Valid: 1,147,000 Spoilt: 3 Quota: 114,701 Turnout: 98.1%

=== Labour Panel ===
Labour Panel: 11 seats
Party	Candidate	FPv%	Count																
Party	Candidate	FPv%	1	2	3	4	5	6	7	8	9	10	11	12	13	14	15	16	17
Fianna Fáil	Robbie Gallagher	10.0	115,000																
Independent	Gerard Craughwell	8.2	95,000	97,016															
Sinn Féin	Chris Andrews	8.1	94,000	94,000	94,210	97,210													
Social Democrats	Patricia Stephenson	8.1	94,000	94,504	94,504	94,504	94,504	97,504											
Sinn Féin	Maria McCormack	7.8	90,000	90,000	90,000	91,000	91,486	95,486	95,486	95,591	95,591	95,591	95,591	95,591	95,591	95,591	95,591	95,591	96,591
Labour	Nessa Cosgrove	6.8	78,000	78,504	78,609	78,609	79,095	80,095	81,263	83,431	83,431	83,431	85,431	86,323	86,323	90,323	91,274	91,274	96,778
Fine Gael	Mark Duffy	6.6	76,000	76,168	76,273	76,273	76,273	76,273	76,273	81,273	91,441	93,441	94,441	94,441	115,441				
Fine Gael	Joe O'Reilly	5.8	67,000	67,672	67,777	67,777	67,777	68,777	68,777	74,777	82,777	83,777	83,945	83,945	95,945				
Fianna Fáil	Margaret Murphy O'Mahony	5.7	66,000	69,696	69,906	69,906	69,906	69,906	69,906	70,242	70,242	82,578	105,578						
Fine Gael	Mike Kennelly	5.0	58,000	58,504	58,504	58,504	58,504	58,504	58,504	62,088	68,088	68,088	70,256	70,702	96,702				
Fianna Fáil	Anne Rabbitte	4.8	55,000	57,184	57,394	57,394	57,394	57,394	57,394	58,394	58,394	65,066	78,410	80,640	82,640	89,640	89,640	89,704	
Fianna Fáil	Bernard Moynihan	4.6	53,000	56,024	56,024	56,024	56,024	56,024	56,024	56,024	56,024	62,192							
Fine Gael	Leonora Carey	4.4	51,000	51,000	51,000	51,000	51,000	52,000	52,000	54,000	63,000	64,000	64,000	64,000					
Fianna Fáil	Pat Casey	4.2	48,000	50,688	50,793	50,793	50,793	50,793	50,793	50,961	50,961	63,465	83,997	90,221	90,221	92,221	92,221	92,349	131,349
Fianna Fáil	Michael Smyth	3.6	41,000	43,352	43,352	43,352	43,352	43,352	43,352	43,352	43,352								
Fine Gael	Anna Grainger	2.6	30,000	30,168	30,273	30,273	30,273	30,273	30,273	33,273									
Fine Gael	Jimmy Kavanagh	2.0	23,000	23,672	23,777	23,777	23,777	23,777	24,631										
Sinn Féin	Paul Gavan	0.8	10,000	10,000	10,000	11,000	11,486												
Sinn Féin	Daithí Doolan	0.4	5,000	5,000	5,000														
Electorate: 1,172 Valid: 1,150,000 Spoilt: 1 Quota: 95,751 Turnout: 98.12%

=== Nominated by the Taoiseach ===
The eleven nominated members were divided among the coalition partners, with 6 Fianna Fáil and 5 Fine Gael members chosen. For the first time since 1989, no Independent senators were nominated.

Nominated by the Taoiseach: 11 seats (uncontested)
Party	Candidate
Fine Gael	Manus Boyle
Fine Gael	Nikki Bradley
Fianna Fáil	Lorraine Clifford-Lee
Fianna Fáil	Alison Comyn
Fianna Fáil	Joe Flaherty
Fianna Fáil	Imelda Goldsboro
Fine Gael	Evanne Ní Chuilinn
Fine Gael	Noel O'Donovan
Fianna Fáil	Anne Rabbitte
Fianna Fáil	Dee Ryan
Fine Gael	Gareth Scahill
