= Annie Hoey =

Irish former politician (born 1988)

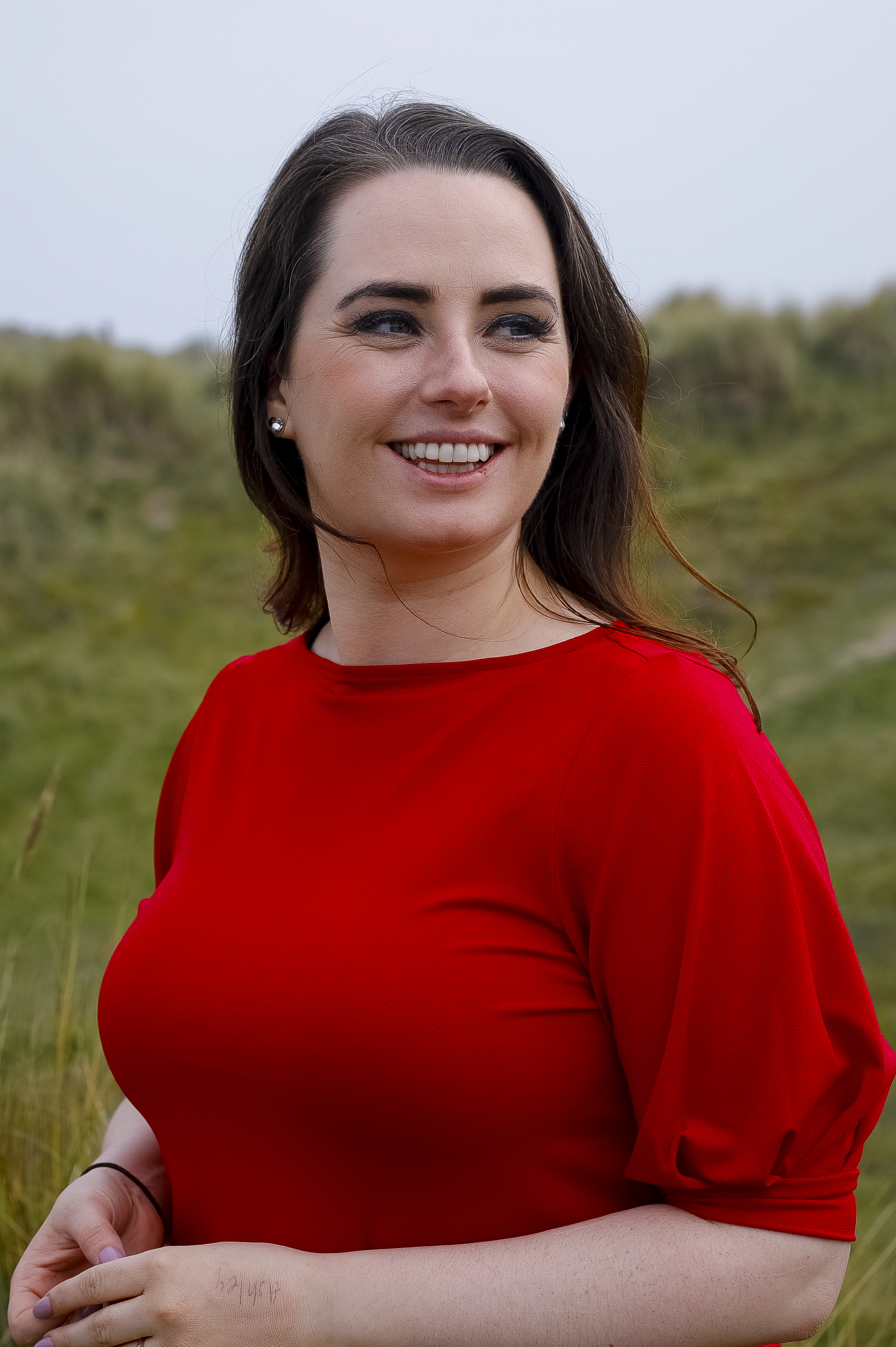
- Hoey in 2019

Senator
- In office 29 June 2020 – 30 January 2025
- Constituency: Agricultural Panel

Personal details
- Born: 3 October 1988 (age 38) Drogheda, County Louth, Ireland
- Party: Labour Party
- Spouse: Dan Waugh
- Education: University College Cork; University of Limerick; Trinity College Dublin
- Website: anniehoey.com

Annie Hoey (born 3 October 1988) is an Irish former Labour Party politician who served as a Senator for the Agricultural Panel from June 2020 until January 2025.

== Early life and education ==
Hoey is from Beamore, Drogheda, a suburb just by the border between County Meath and County Louth.

She graduated with a Bachelor of Arts in Drama and Theatre Studies in 2009, a Master of Arts in Comparative and World Literature in 2012, and a Postgraduate certificate in Women's Studies in 2013, all from University College Cork. Hoey was voted "college society person of the year" in 2013 for her work with Amnesty, as chairperson of the UCC LGBT Society, and for co-founding of a humanist society in Cork. She also co-founded the UCC Feminist Society.

Hoey later studied for a specialist diploma in quality management at the University of Limerick in 2019. She then graduated in 2023 with a Postgraduate Diploma in Social Policy and Practise from Trinity College Dublin.

== Career ==
=== Representative student organisations ===
In 2013, Hoey was elected as the deputy president and campaigns officer for UCC Students' Union.

At the Aontas na Mac Léinn in Éirinn (AMLÉ) congress in April 2014, Hoey was elected as the Vice President for Equality and Citizenship. In March 2015, Hoey was re-elected to the same position.

During 2014 and 2015, in the lead-up to the referendum on the Thirty-fourth Amendment of the Constitution of Ireland, known as the Marriage Equality referendum, Hoey used her role as Vice President for Equality and Citizenship to mobilise students across the country. She organised AMLÉ's flagship Pink Training event in Cork in November 2014.

During Hoey's second term as the AMLÉs Vice President for Equality and Citizenship, she was appointed Deputy President of AMLÉ to President Kevin Donoghue.

Hoey then served as President of AMLÉ from 2016 to 2017. During her tenure as AMLÉ President, an estimated 15,000 students took part in the #EducationIs demonstration in Dublin, to show student opposition to income contingent loan schemes. In March 2017, Hoey presented to the Citizens' Assembly at the fourth meeting of the Citizens' Assembly on the Eighth Amendment of the Constitution.

Hoey was also a board member of the Higher Education Authority.

=== Political work ===
Hoey took up the role as the Education and Training officer for the Coalition to Repeal the Eighth Amendment in 2017. Soon after, Hoey was appointed as the National Canvassing Coordinator and a spokesperson for Together For Yes working for long-time campaigner Ailbhe Smyth.

During the 2018 presidential election, Hoey was appointed Volunteer Director for campaign to re-elect Michael D. Higgins. Shortly after, Hoey was employed as the Women and Youth Development Manager with the Labour Party from 2019 to 2020.

=== Meath County Council ===
In the 2019 local elections Hoey was elected on the 9th count in May 2019 to represent Laytown-Bettystown local electoral area on the Meath County Council with 1,093 first preference votes. She served as a member of Meath County Council from 2019 to 2020.

=== 2020 elections ===
In February 2020, Hoey unsuccessfully contested the 2020 general election as the Labour Party candidate for the Meath East constituency, receiving 874 first preference votes (2.08%).

In March 2020, Hoey successfully contested the 2020 Seanad election as the Labour Party candidate for the Agricultural Panel. Hoey received 63 first preference votes (weighted to a value of 63,000) and was elected on the 20th count with a final weighted vote tally of 94,186. Elaine McGinty was co-opted to Hoey's seat on Meath County Council following her election to the Seanad.

=== Seanad Éireann ===
In June 2020, Hoey became the first out bisexual member of Ireland's national parliament. From 2021 to 2023, she raised topics on LGBTQ+ issues over 25 times inside the Oireachtas, especially on parental matters and trans healthcare. She also championed the Dublin Gay Theatre Festival in 2022 as a “focal supporter in the Oireachtas” and has worked internationally to support LGBTQ+ rights also beyond the Irish borders.

Hoey was one of five Labour senators to seek a High Court ruling to determine whether the Seanad can sit before the eleven Taoiseach's nominees have been chosen. In July 2020, Hoey was appointed party spokesperson on Higher Education, Innovation and Research. She introduced legislation to link student nurses and midwives pay to Health Care Assistants' pay in December 2020 after months of campaigning.

In 2023, she campaigned for the introduction of a LungCheck screening programme, similar to that of BreastCheck or CervicalCheck. Hoey welcomed the news that a pilot would be getting underway when announced in April 2023.

In February 2024, Hoey confronted social media company X executives with sexually abusive and violent posts directed at her on what she called a "hellscape" platform, where she claimed the platform was "doing infinitely more harm”.

She did not contest the 2025 Seanad election.

== Personal life ==
Hoey is bisexual. She is married to Dan Waugh. In 2023, she was nominated for 'LGBTQ+ Person of the Year Award' at the GALAS 2023.
