= Malcolm Noonan =

Irish politician (born 1966)

Senator Malcolm Noonan
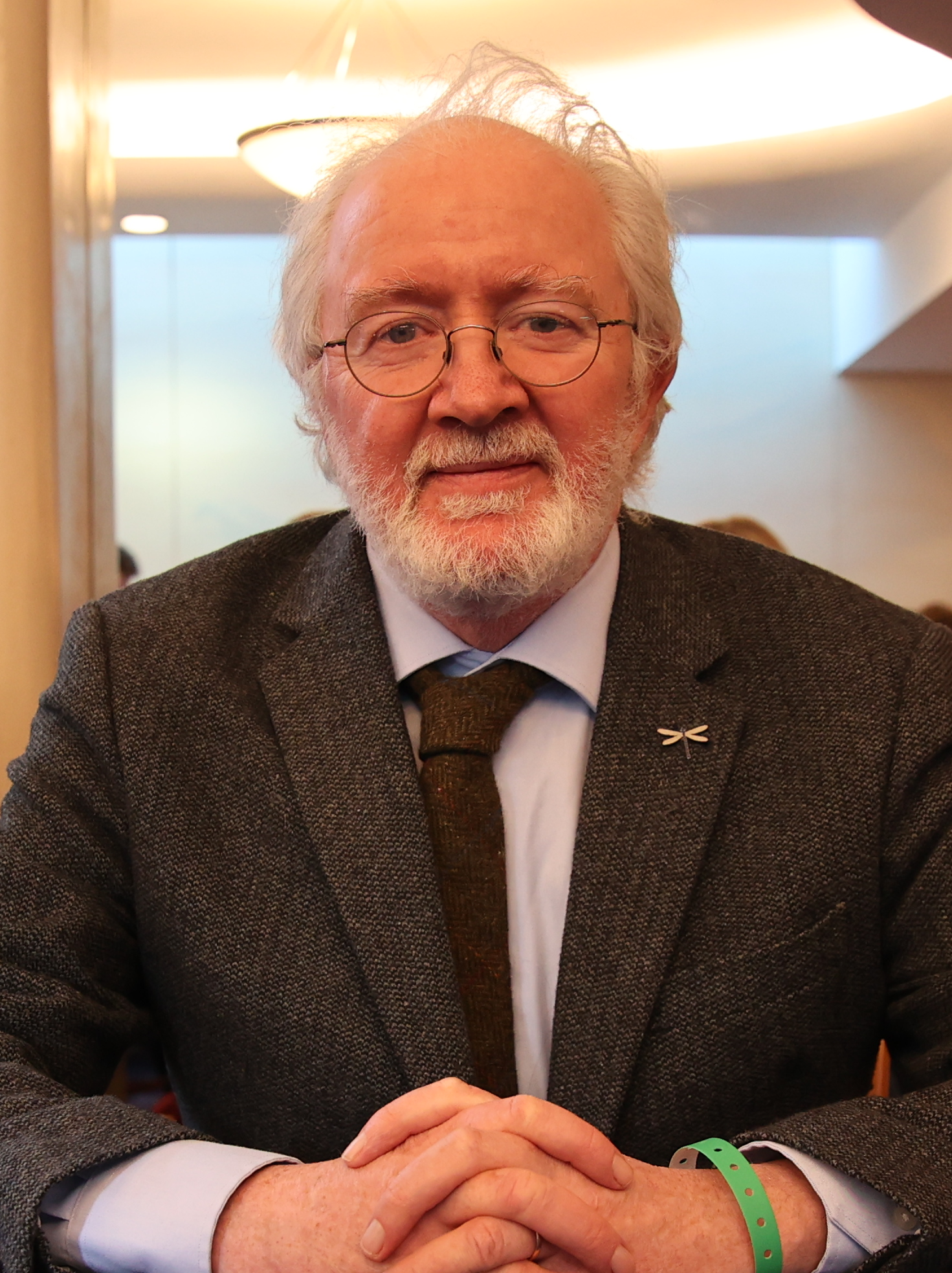
- Noonan in 2025

Senator
- Incumbent
- Assumed office January 2025
- Constituency: Agricultural Panel

Minister of State
- 2020–2025: Housing, Local Government and Heritage

Teachta Dála
- In office February 2020 – November 2024
- Constituency: Carlow–Kilkenny

Personal details
- Born: September 1966 (age 60) Kilkenny, Ireland
- Party: Green Party

Malcolm Noonan (born September 1966) is an Irish Green Party senator who has been a senator for the Agricultural Panel since January 2025. He previously served as a Minister of State from July 2020 to January 2025, and as a Teachta Dála (TD) for the Carlow–Kilkenny constituency from February 2020 to November 2024.

Before entering politics, Noonan worked for twenty years as a community and environmental activist with Friends of the Earth. He was a member of Kilkenny County Council for the Kilkenny local electoral area from 2004 to 2020 and was Mayor of Kilkenny from 2009 to 2010. Maria Dollard was co-opted to Noonan's seat on Kilkenny County Council following his election to the Dáil.

In 2011, Noonan contested the leadership of the Green Party. He was a candidate at the Carlow–Kilkenny by-election and at the 2016 general election.

At the 2020 general election, he won a seat in Carlow–Kilkenny, taking the last of five seats on the tenth count. Noonan had proven transfer-friendly, and told The Irish Times, "for the first time, we didn’t have to sell the climate issue this election. Young people were asking us what we were going to do".

On 1 July 2020, he was appointed by the Fianna Fáil–Fine Gael–Green coalition government as Minister of State at the Department of Housing, Local Government and Heritage with responsibility for Nature, Heritage and Electoral Reform.

Noonan lost his Dáil seat at the 2024 general election. He was elected to Seanad Éireann at the 2025 Seanad election for the Agricultural Panel.

Political offices
Preceded by John Paul Phelan; Damien English as Minister of State at the Department of Housing, Planning and Local Government	Minister of State at the Department of Housing, Local Government and Heritage; 2020–2025; With: Peter Burke	Succeeded by Christopher O'Sullivan

Dáil	Election	Deputy (Party)	Deputy (Party)	Deputy (Party)	Deputy (Party)	Deputy (Party)
2nd	1921	Edward Aylward (SF)	W. T. Cosgrave (SF)	James Lennon (SF)	Gearóid O'Sullivan (SF)	4 seats 1921–1923
3rd	1922	Patrick Gaffney (Lab)	W. T. Cosgrave (PT-SF)	Denis Gorey (FP)	Gearóid O'Sullivan (PT-SF)	4 seats 1921–1923
4th	1923	Edward Doyle (Lab)	W. T. Cosgrave (CnaG)	Denis Gorey (FP)	Michael Shelly (Rep)	Seán Gibbons (CnaG)
4th	1925 by-election	Edward Doyle (Lab)	W. T. Cosgrave (CnaG)	Denis Gorey (FP)	Michael Shelly (Rep)	Thomas Bolger (CnaG)
5th	1927 (Jun)	Edward Doyle (Lab)	W. T. Cosgrave (CnaG)	Denis Gorey (CnaG)	Thomas Derrig (FF)	Richard Holohan (FP)
6th	1927 (Sep)	Edward Doyle (Lab)	W. T. Cosgrave (CnaG)	Peter de Loughry (CnaG)	Thomas Derrig (FF)	Richard Holohan (FP)
6th	1927 by-election	Edward Doyle (Lab)	Denis Gorey (CnaG)	Peter de Loughry (CnaG)	Thomas Derrig (FF)	Richard Holohan (FP)
7th	1932	Francis Humphreys (FF)	Denis Gorey (CnaG)	Desmond FitzGerald (CnaG)	Thomas Derrig (FF)	Seán Gibbons (FF)
8th	1933	James Pattison (Lab)	Richard Holohan (NCP)	Desmond FitzGerald (CnaG)	Thomas Derrig (FF)	Seán Gibbons (FF)
9th	1937	Constituency abolished. See Kilkenny and Carlow–Kildare				

Dáil	Election	Deputy (Party)	Deputy (Party)	Deputy (Party)	Deputy (Party)	Deputy (Party)
13th	1948	James Pattison (NLP)	Thomas Walsh (FF)	Thomas Derrig (FF)	Joseph Hughes (FG)	Patrick Crotty (FG)
14th	1951	Francis Humphreys (FF)	Thomas Walsh (FF)	Thomas Derrig (FF)	Joseph Hughes (FG)	Patrick Crotty (FG)
15th	1954	James Pattison (Lab)	Thomas Walsh (FF)	Thomas Derrig (FF)	Joseph Hughes (FG)	Patrick Crotty (FG)
15th	1956 by-election	James Pattison (Lab)	Martin Medlar (FF)	Thomas Derrig (FF)	Joseph Hughes (FG)	Patrick Crotty (FG)
16th	1957	Francis Humphreys (FF)	Martin Medlar (FF)	Jim Gibbons (FF)	Joseph Hughes (FG)	Patrick Crotty (FG)
16th	1960 by-election	Patrick Teehan (FF)	Martin Medlar (FF)	Jim Gibbons (FF)	Joseph Hughes (FG)	Patrick Crotty (FG)
17th	1961	Séamus Pattison (Lab)	Martin Medlar (FF)	Jim Gibbons (FF)	Desmond Governey (FG)	Patrick Crotty (FG)
18th	1965	Séamus Pattison (Lab)	Tom Nolan (FF)	Jim Gibbons (FF)	Desmond Governey (FG)	Patrick Crotty (FG)
19th	1969	Séamus Pattison (Lab)	Tom Nolan (FF)	Jim Gibbons (FF)	Desmond Governey (FG)	Kieran Crotty (FG)
20th	1973	Séamus Pattison (Lab)	Tom Nolan (FF)	Jim Gibbons (FF)	Desmond Governey (FG)	Kieran Crotty (FG)
21st	1977	Séamus Pattison (Lab)	Tom Nolan (FF)	Jim Gibbons (FF)	Liam Aylward (FF)	Kieran Crotty (FG)
22nd	1981	Séamus Pattison (Lab)	Tom Nolan (FF)	Desmond Governey (FG)	Liam Aylward (FF)	Kieran Crotty (FG)
23rd	1982 (Feb)	Séamus Pattison (Lab)	Jim Gibbons (FF)	Desmond Governey (FG)	Liam Aylward (FF)	Kieran Crotty (FG)
24th	1982 (Nov)	Séamus Pattison (Lab)	M. J. Nolan (FF)	Dick Dowling (FG)	Liam Aylward (FF)	Kieran Crotty (FG)
25th	1987	Séamus Pattison (Lab)	M. J. Nolan (FF)	Martin Gibbons (PDs)	Liam Aylward (FF)	Kieran Crotty (FG)
26th	1989	Séamus Pattison (Lab)	M. J. Nolan (FF)	Phil Hogan (FG)	Liam Aylward (FF)	John Browne (FG)
27th	1992	Séamus Pattison (Lab)	M. J. Nolan (FF)	Phil Hogan (FG)	Liam Aylward (FF)	John Browne (FG)
28th	1997	Séamus Pattison (Lab)	John McGuinness (FF)	Phil Hogan (FG)	Liam Aylward (FF)	John Browne (FG)
29th	2002	Séamus Pattison (Lab)	John McGuinness (FF)	Phil Hogan (FG)	Liam Aylward (FF)	M. J. Nolan (FF)
30th	2007	Mary White (GP)	John McGuinness (FF)	Phil Hogan (FG)	Bobby Aylward (FF)	M. J. Nolan (FF)
31st	2011	Ann Phelan (Lab)	John McGuinness (FF)	Phil Hogan (FG)	John Paul Phelan (FG)	Pat Deering (FG)
31st	2015 by-election	Ann Phelan (Lab)	John McGuinness (FF)	Bobby Aylward (FF)	John Paul Phelan (FG)	Pat Deering (FG)
32nd	2016	Kathleen Funchion (SF)	John McGuinness (FF)	Bobby Aylward (FF)	John Paul Phelan (FG)	Pat Deering (FG)
33rd	2020	Kathleen Funchion (SF)	John McGuinness (FF)	Jennifer Murnane O'Connor (FF)	John Paul Phelan (FG)	Malcolm Noonan (GP)
34th	2024	Natasha Newsome Drennan (SF)	John McGuinness (FF)	Jennifer Murnane O'Connor (FF)	Catherine Callaghan (FG)	Peter "Chap" Cleere (FF)
