= William O'Callaghan (politician) =

Irish politician (1881–1967)

Senator
- In office 18 August 1944 – 14 December 1961
- In office 27 April 1938 – 8 September 1943
- Constituency: Agricultural Panel

Personal details
- Born: 1881 County Cork, Ireland
- Died: 28 January 1967 (aged 85–86) County Cork, Ireland
- Party: Fine Gael
- Spouse: Anna Sheahan
- Children: 4

William O'Callaghan (1881 – 28 January 1967) was an Irish Fine Gael politician. He was the ninth child born to Catherine (née Donovan) and Cornelius O'Callaghan, farmers in Scarragh, Lombardstown, County Cork. He married Anna Sheahan and together they had four children. He bought Longueville House, Mallow in 1938.

He was a member of Seanad Éireann from 1938 to 1943 and from 1944 to 1961. A farmer, he was first elected to the Seanad in 1938 by the Agricultural Panel. He lost his seat at the 1943 election but was re-elected at the 1944 election. He was re-elected at the 1948, 1951, 1954 and 1957 elections. He did not contest the 1961 Seanad election.

He died on 28 January 1967 and is buried in St. Gobnait's Cemetery, Mallow, County Cork.
