= Jack Barrett (politician) =

Irish politician

Senator
- In office 1 June 1973 – 27 October 1977
- Constituency: Agricultural Panel

Personal details
- Party: Fine Gael

Jack Barrett was an Irish Fine Gael politician. A farmer and livestock exporter, he was elected to Seanad Éireann by the Agricultural Panel at the 1973 Seanad election. He did not contest the 1977 Seanad election.
