= Agricultural Panel =

Seanad Éireann constituency

- Seanad Éireann constituency

Current constituency
- Created: 1938
- Seats: 11
- Senators: Niall Blaney (FF); Victor Boyhan (Ind); Paraic Brady (FG); Maria Byrne (FG); Joanne Collins (SF); Teresa Costello (FF); Paul Daly (FF); Eileen Lynch (FG); P. J. Murphy (FG); Malcolm Noonan (GP); Sarah O'Reilly (Aon)

The Agricultural Panel is one of five vocational panels which together elect 43 of the 60 members of Seanad Éireann, the senate of the Oireachtas (the legislature of Ireland). The Agricultural Panel elects eleven senators.

== Election ==
Article 18 of the Constitution of Ireland provides that 43 of the 60 senators are to be elected from five vocational panels. The Agricultural Panel is defined in Article 18.7.1°(v) as "Agriculture and allied interests, and Fisheries". The Seanad returning officer maintains a list of nominating bodies for each of the five panels. Candidates may be nominated either by four members of the Oireachtas or by a nominating body. The electorate consists of city and county councillors and current members of the Oireachtas. As the Seanad election takes place after the election to the Dáil, the Oireachtas members are the members of the incoming Dáil and the outgoing Seanad. Eleven senators are elected on the Agricultural Panel, at least four of whom must have been nominated by Oireachtas members and at least four must have been nominated by nominating bodies.

== Senators ==
Senators for the Agricultural Panel
Key to parties: Aon = Aontú; CnaT = Clann na Talmhan; PDs = Progressive Democrats; FF = Fianna Fáil; FG = Fine Gael; GP = Green; Lab = Labour; SF = Sinn Féin; Ind U = Ind. Unionist; Ind = Independent
Sen	Election	Senator (Party)	Senator (Party)	Senator (Party)	Senator (Party)	Senator (Party)	Senator (Party)	Senator (Party)	Senator (Party)	Senator (Party)	Senator (Party)	Senator (Party)
2nd	1938	John Nassau Greene (Ind.)	Michael Twomey (Ind.)	Patrick Kehoe (FF)	Martin O'Dwyer (Ind.)	William Quirke (Note: Died on 5 March 1955) (FF)	Seán Gibbons (FF)	Pádraic Ó Máille (FF)	Ross McGillycuddy (Ind.)	William O'Callaghan (FG)	William Caffrey (FG)	Patrick Baxter (FG)
3rd	1938	Dominick MacCabe (Ind.)	Neal Blaney (FF)	Patrick Kehoe (FF)	Martin O'Dwyer (Ind.)	William Quirke (FF)	Seán Gibbons (FF)	Michael Colbert (FF)	Ross McGillycuddy (Ind.)	William O'Callaghan (FG)	John Counihan (Ind.)	Patrick Baxter (Note: Died on 3 April 1959) (CnaT)
4th	1943	Dominick MacCabe (Ind.)	Daniel Hogan (FF)	Patrick Kehoe (FF)	Thomas Walsh (FF)	William Quirke (FF)	Seán Gibbons (FF)	Michael Colbert (FF)	Peter Lynch (Ind.)	Gerard Sweetman (FG)	John Counihan (Ind.)	Patrick Baxter (CnaT)
5th	1944	Dominick MacCabe (Ind.)	Daniel Hogan (FF)	Patrick Kehoe (FF)	Patrick O'Reilly (FF)	William Quirke (FF)	Timothy O'Donovan (FG)	William O'Callaghan (FG)	Edmund Horan (CnaT)	Gerard Sweetman (FG)	John Counihan (Ind.)	Patrick Baxter (CnaT)
6th	1948	James Tunney (Lab)	Robert Malachy Burke (Note: Resigned on 6 December 1950) (Lab)	Seán Gibbons (FF)	Patrick O'Reilly (FF)	William Quirke (FF)	Timothy O'Donovan (FG)	William O'Callaghan (FG)	Martin O'Dwyer (Ind.)	Martin Quinn (Ind.)	John Counihan (Ind.)	Patrick Baxter (CnaT)
7th	1951	James Tunney (Lab)	Patrick Gorry (FF)	James Kilroy (Note: Died on 5 January 1954) (FF)	Patrick O'Reilly (FF)	William Quirke (FF)	Timothy O'Donovan (FG)	William O'Callaghan (FG)	Martin O'Dwyer (Ind.)	Michael Óg McFadden (FG)	Bernard Commons (CnaT)	Patrick Baxter (CnaT)
8th	1954	James J. McCrea (Lab)	Timothy O'Sullivan (FF)	Patrick Cogan (Ind.)	Patrick O'Reilly (FF)	William Quirke (FF)	John Mannion Snr (FG)	William O'Callaghan (FG)	John Donnelly Sheridan (Note: Died on 5 April 1963) (Ind.)	Micheál Prendergast (FG)	Bernard Commons (CnaT)	Patrick Baxter (CnaT)
8th	1956	James J. McCrea (Lab)	Timothy O'Sullivan (FF)	Patrick Cogan (Ind.)	Patrick O'Reilly (FF)	Joe Sheridan (Note: Elected to Seanad at a by-election on 14 May 1956) (Ind.)	John Mannion Snr (FG)	William O'Callaghan (FG)	John Donnelly Sheridan (Ind.)	Micheál Prendergast (FG)	Bernard Commons (CnaT)	Patrick Baxter (CnaT)
9th	1957	James Tunney (Lab)	Timothy O'Sullivan (FF)	Daniel Hogan (FF)	Patrick O'Reilly (FF)	Robert Lahiffe (FF)	Paddy Donegan (FG)	William O'Callaghan (FG)	John Donnelly Sheridan (Ind.)	Micheál Prendergast (FG)	Patrick Crowe (FG)	Patrick Baxter (CnaT)
9th	1960	James Tunney (Lab)	Timothy O'Sullivan (FF)	Daniel Hogan (FF)	Patrick O'Reilly (FF)	Robert Lahiffe (FF)	Paddy Donegan (FG)	William O'Callaghan (FG)	John Donnelly Sheridan (Ind.)	Micheál Prendergast (FG)	Patrick Crowe (FG)	Martin O'Dwyer (Note: Elected to Seanad at a by-election on 9 February 1960) (Ind.)
10th	1961	Jack Fitzgerald (Lab)	Timothy O'Sullivan (FF)	Daniel Hogan (FF)	Patrick O'Reilly (FF)	Robert Lahiffe (FF)	William Ryan (FF)	John Mannion Snr (FG)	John Donnelly Sheridan (Ind.)	Micheál Prendergast (FG)	Charles McDonald (FG)	Patrick W. Ryan (Ind.)
10th	1963	Jack Fitzgerald (Lab)	Timothy O'Sullivan (FF)	Daniel Hogan (FF)	Patrick O'Reilly (FF)	Robert Lahiffe (FF)	William Ryan (FF)	John Mannion Snr (FG)	Batt Donegan (FF)	Micheál Prendergast (FG)	Charles McDonald (FG)	Patrick W. Ryan (Ind.)
11th	1965	Jack Fitzgerald (Lab)	Timothy O'Sullivan (FF)	Patrick McGowan (FF)	Patrick O'Reilly (FF)	James Martin (Note: Died on 3 October 1969) (FF)	William Ryan (FF)	John Mannion Snr (FG)	Patrick Malone (FG)	Micheál Prendergast (FG)	Charles McDonald (FG)	Patrick W. Ryan (Ind.)
12th	1969	Jack Fitzgerald (Lab)	John Doyle (FF)	Patrick McGowan (FF)	Andy O'Brien (FG)	James Martin (FF)	William Ryan (FF)	John Mannion Jnr (FG)	Pierce Butler (FG)	Micheál Prendergast (FG)	Charles McDonald (FG)	Patrick W. Ryan (Ind.)
12th	1970	Jack Fitzgerald (Lab)	John Doyle (FF)	Patrick McGowan (FF)	Andy O'Brien (FG)	Cornelius O'Callaghan (Note: Died on 24 January 1974) (FF)	William Ryan (FF)	John Mannion Jnr (FG)	Pierce Butler (FG)	Micheál Prendergast (FG)	Charles McDonald (FG)	Patrick W. Ryan (Ind.)
13th	1973	Jack Fitzgerald (Lab)	Bob Aylward (Note: Died on 18 July 1974) (FF)	Patrick McGowan (FF)	Bernard Cowen (FF)	Cornelius O'Callaghan (FF)	William Ryan (FF)	John Mannion Jnr (FG)	Pierce Butler (FG)	Jack Barrett (FG)	Liam Whyte (FG)	Joe McCartin (FG)
13th	1975	Jack Fitzgerald (Lab)	Michael Ferris (Note: Elected to Seanad at a by-election on 23 April 1975) (Lab)	Patrick McGowan (FF)	Bernard Cowen (FF)	Pat Codd (FG)	William Ryan (FF)	John Mannion Jnr (FG)	Pierce Butler (FG)	Jack Barrett (FG)	Liam Whyte (FG)	Joe McCartin (FG)
14th	1977	Justin Keating (Lab)	John Ellis (FF)	Patrick McGowan (FF)	Rory Kiely (FF)	Martin O'Toole (FF)	William Ryan (FF)	Paul Connaughton Snr (FG)	Pierce Butler (FG)	Gerard Lynch (FG)	Charles McDonald (FG)	Joe McCartin (FG)
15th	1981	Michael Ferris (Lab)	Tom Fitzgerald (FF)	Thomas Hussey (FF)	Rory Kiely (FF)	Martin O'Toole (FF)	William Ryan (FF)	Liam Naughten (FG)	Pierce Butler (FG)	John Mannion Jnr (FG)	Charles McDonald (FG)	Richard Bruton (FG)
16th	1982	Michael Ferris (Lab)	Tom Fitzgerald (FF)	Thomas Hussey (FF)	Michael Smith (FF)	Martin O'Toole (FF)	William Ryan (FF)	Bernard Durkan (FG)	Richard Hourigan (FG)	John Mannion Jnr (FG)	Charles McDonald (FG)	Joseph Lennon (FG)
17th	1983	Michael Ferris (Lab)	Rory Kiely (FF)	Thomas Hussey (FF)	John Ellis (FF)	Martin O'Toole (FF)	William Ryan (FF)	Michael Quealy (FG)	Richard Hourigan (FG)	Ulick Burke (FG)	Charles McDonald (FG)	Joseph Lennon (FG)
18th	1987	Michael Ferris (Lab)	Rory Kiely (FF)	Thomas Hussey (FF)	Tom Fitzgerald (FF)	Martin O'Toole (FF)	William Ryan (FF)	Patrick McGowan (Note: Died on 3 October 1999) (FF)	Paul Bradford (FG)	Pádraic McCormack (FG)	Charles McDonald (FG)	John Connor (FG)
19th	1989	Pat Upton (Lab)	Rory Kiely (FF)	Thomas Hussey (FF)	Tom Fitzgerald (FF)	Francis O'Brien (FF)	Seán McCarthy (FF)	Patrick McGowan (FF)	Liam Naughten (Note: Died on 16 November 1996) (FG)	Richard Hourigan (FG)	Charles McDonald (FG)	Avril Doyle (FG)
20th	1993	Michael Calnan (Lab)	Rory Kiely (FF)	Brendan Daly (FF)	Tom Fitzgerald (FF)	Francis O'Brien (FF)	John V. Farrelly (FG)	Patrick McGowan (FF)	Liam Naughten (FG)	Michael D'Arcy (FG)	Paddy Burke (FG)	John Dardis (PDs)
20th	1997	Michael Calnan (Lab)	Rory Kiely (FF)	Brendan Daly (FF)	Tom Fitzgerald (FF)	Francis O'Brien (FF)	John V. Farrelly (FG)	Patrick McGowan (FF)	Denis Naughten (Note: Elected to Seanad at by-election on 28 January 1997) (FG)	Michael D'Arcy (FG)	Paddy Burke (FG)	John Dardis (PDs)
21st	1997	Kathleen O'Meara (Lab)	Rory Kiely (FF)	Pat Moylan (FF)	Jim Walsh (Note: Resigned the Fianna Fáil whip on 26 March 2015) (FF)	Francis O'Brien (FF)	Peter Callanan (Note: Died on 11 October 2009) (FF)	Patrick McGowan (FF)	Tom Hayes (Note: Elected to Dáil at the Tipperary South by-election on 30 June 2001) (FG)	John Connor (FG)	Paddy Burke (FG)	Avril Doyle (FG)
21st	2000	Kathleen O'Meara (Lab)	Rory Kiely (FF)	Pat Moylan (FF)	Jim Walsh (FF)	Francis O'Brien (FF)	Peter Callanan (FF)	Seán Ó Fearghaíl (Note: Elected to Seanad in a by-election on 2 June 2000) (FF)	Tom Hayes (FG)	John Connor (FG)	Paddy Burke (FG)	Avril Doyle (FG)
21st	2001	Kathleen O'Meara (Lab)	Rory Kiely (FF)	Pat Moylan (FF)	Jim Walsh (FF)	Francis O'Brien (FF)	Peter Callanan (FF)	Seán Ó Fearghaíl (FF)	M. J. Nolan (Note: Elected to the Seanad at a by-election in December 2001) (FF)	John Connor (FG)	Paddy Burke (FG)	Avril Doyle (FG)
22nd	2002	Kathleen O'Meara (Lab)	Rory Kiely (FF)	Eamon Scanlon (FF)	Jim Walsh (FF)	Francis O'Brien (FF)	Peter Callanan (FF)	Martin Mansergh (FF)	John Paul Phelan (FG)	Ulick Burke (FG)	Paddy Burke (FG)	Paul Bradford (Note: Lost the Fine Gael whip on 16 July 2013) (Note: Joined Renua on 13 March 2015.) (FG)
23rd	2007	Alan Kelly (Note: Elected to the European Parliament on 7 June 2009.) (Lab)	Pearse Doherty (Note: Elected to Dáil Éireann in a by-election on 26 November 2010) (SF)	John Carty (FF)	Jim Walsh (FF)	Francis O'Brien (FF)	Peter Callanan (FF)	Pat Moylan (FF)	John Paul Phelan (FG)	Eugene Regan (FG)	Paddy Burke (FG)	Paul Bradford (FG)
23rd	2009	Niall Ó Brolcháin (Note: Elected to Seanad in a by-election on 14 December 2009) (GP)	Pearse Doherty (SF)	John Carty (FF)	Jim Walsh (FF)	Francis O'Brien (FF)	Peter Callanan (FF)	Pat Moylan (FF)	John Paul Phelan (FG)	Eugene Regan (FG)	Paddy Burke (FG)	Paul Bradford (FG)
23rd	2010	Niall Ó Brolcháin (GP)	Pearse Doherty (SF)	John Carty (FF)	Jim Walsh (FF)	Francis O'Brien (FF)	Paschal Mooney (Note: Elected to Seanad in a by-election on 19 January 2010) (FF)	Pat Moylan (FF)	John Paul Phelan (FG)	Eugene Regan (FG)	Paddy Burke (FG)	Paul Bradford (FG)
24th	2011	James Heffernan (Note: Lost the Labour whip on 21 December 2012) (Note: Joined the Social Democrats on 3 September 2015) (Lab)	Trevor Ó Clochartaigh (Note: Resigned the Sinn Féin whip on 30 November 2017) (Note: Resigned from Seanad on 5 March 2018) (SF)	Susan O'Keeffe (Lab)	Jim Walsh (FF)	Denis O'Donovan (FF)	Paschal Mooney (FF)	Brian Ó Domhnaill (Note: Resigned from Fianna Fáil in December 2016) (FF)	Michael Comiskey (FG)	Pat O'Neill (FG)	Paddy Burke (FG)	Paul Bradford (FG)
25th	2016	Denis Landy (Note: Retired on health grounds on 28 November 2017) (Lab)	Trevor Ó Clochartaigh (SF)	Rose Conway-Walsh (Note: Elected to Dáil Éireann on 8 February 2020.) (SF)	Grace O'Sullivan (Note: Elected to the European Parliament on 24 May 2019) (GP)	Denis O'Donovan (FF)	Paul Daly (FF)	Brian Ó Domhnaill (FF)	Victor Boyhan (Ind.)	Maria Byrne (FG)	Paddy Burke (FG)	Tim Lombard (FG)
25th	2018	Ian Marshall (Note: Elected at a by-election on 27 April 2018) (Ind U)	Anthony Lawlor (FG)	Rose Conway-Walsh (SF)	Grace O'Sullivan (GP)	Denis O'Donovan (FF)	Paul Daly (FF)	Brian Ó Domhnaill (FF)	Victor Boyhan (Ind.)	Maria Byrne (FG)	Paddy Burke (FG)	Tim Lombard (FG)
25th	2019	Ian Marshall (Ind U)	Anthony Lawlor (FG)	Rose Conway-Walsh (SF)	Pippa Hackett (Note: Elected unopposed at a by-election on 1 November 2019) (GP)	Denis O'Donovan (FF)	Paul Daly (FF)	Brian Ó Domhnaill (FF)	Victor Boyhan (Ind.)	Maria Byrne (FG)	Paddy Burke (FG)	Tim Lombard (FG)
26th	2020	Annie Hoey (Lab)	Lynn Boylan (Note: Elected to the European Parliament on 7 June 2024) (SF)	Niall Blaney (FF)	Pippa Hackett (GP)	Denis O'Donovan (FF)	Paul Daly (FF)	Eugene Murphy (FF)	Victor Boyhan (Ind.)	Michael W. D'Arcy (Note: Resigned from the Seanad on 28 June 2020.) (FG)	Paddy Burke (FG)	Tim Lombard (FG)
26th	2021	Annie Hoey (Lab)	Lynn Boylan (SF)	Niall Blaney (FF)	Pippa Hackett (GP)	Denis O'Donovan (FF)	Paul Daly (FF)	Eugene Murphy (FF)	Victor Boyhan (Ind.)	Maria Byrne (Note: Elected at a by-election on 21 April 2021) (FG)	Paddy Burke (FG)	Tim Lombard (FG)
27th	2025	Sarah O'Reilly (Aon)	Joanne Collins (SF)	Niall Blaney (FF)	Malcolm Noonan (GP)	Teresa Costello (FF)	Paul Daly (FF)	Eileen Lynch (FG)	Victor Boyhan (Ind.)	Maria Byrne (FG)	Paraic Brady (FG)	P. J. Murphy (FG)

Note: The columns in this table are used only for presentational purposes, and no significance should be attached to the order of columns.

== List of nominating bodies ==
The following bodies are on the register of nominating bodies maintained by the Seanad Returning Officer for the Administrative Panel.

- Agricultural Science Association
- Dairy Executives' Association
- Irish Thoroughbred Breeders' Association
- Irish Co-operative Organisation Society
- Irish Grain and Feed Association
- Irish Greyhound Owners and Breeders' Federation
- Irish South and West Fish Producers Organisation
- Munster Agricultural Society Company
- National Association of Regional Game Councils (NARGC)
- Royal Dublin Society (RDS)
