= Maria Byrne =

Irish politician (born 1967)

Senator Maria Byrne
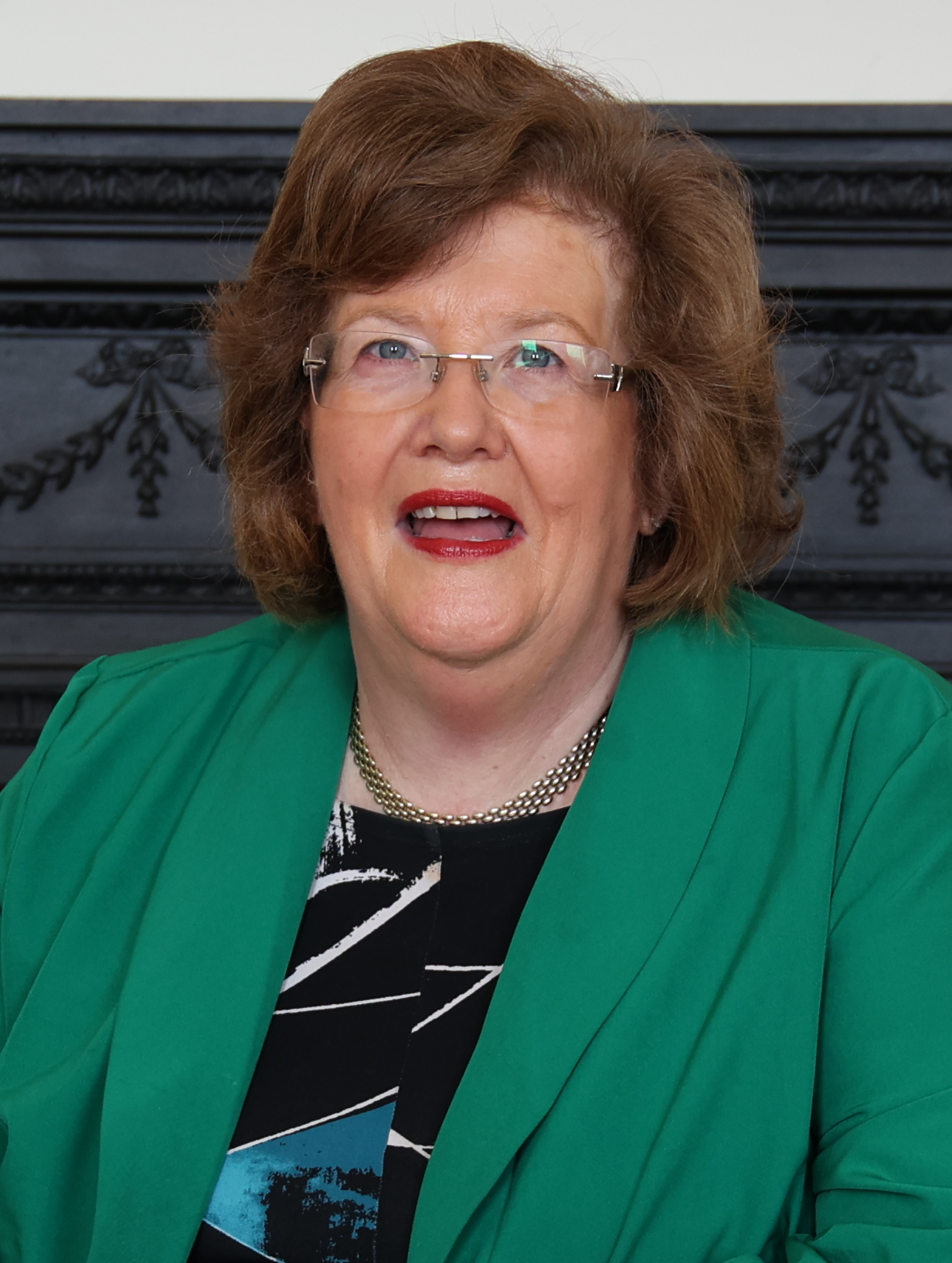
- Byrne in 2025

Leas-Chathaoirleach of Seanad Éireann
- Incumbent
- Assumed office 19 February 2025
- Cathaoirleach: Mark Daly
- Preceded by: Mark Daly

Senator
- Incumbent
- Assumed office 21 April 2021
- In office 8 June 2016 – 29 June 2020
- Constituency: Agricultural Panel

Personal details
- Born: 27 November 1967 (age 58) Limerick, Ireland
- Party: Fine Gael

Maria Byrne (born 27 November 1967) is an Irish Fine Gael politician who has served as Leas-Chathaoirleach of Seanad Éireann since February 2025.

Byrne served as a member of Limerick City and County Council from 1999 up until her election to Seanad Éireann in April 2016. She served as Mayor of Limerick from 2010 to 2011.

She was first elected as a senator on the Agricultural Panel in the 25th Seanad in April 2016. She was the Fine Gael Seanad spokesperson for Education and Skills. At the 2020 general election, she was a Fine Gael candidate for the 33rd Dáil in the Limerick City, but was not elected. She lost her Seanad seat at the 2020 Seanad election, but was a successful candidate at the 2021 Seanad by-elections, for the Agricultural Panel in April 2021. She was re-elected to the 27th Seanad at the 2025 Seanad election on the Agricultural Panel.

She was elected as Leas-Chathaoirleach of Seanad Éireann on 19 February 2025. She also sits as Cathaoirleach of the Committee Selection for the Seanad Éireann.
