= Martin O'Dwyer =

Irish politician (1886–1974)

Senator
- In office 9 February 1960 – 14 December 1961
- In office 21 April 1948 – 22 July 1954
- In office 27 April 1938 – 8 September 1943
- Constituency: Agricultural Panel

Personal details
- Born: 1886
- Died: 18 November 1974 (aged 87–88)
- Political party: Independent

Martin O'Dwyer (1886 – 18 November 1974) was an Irish politician. He was an independent member of Seanad Éireann from 1938 to 1943, 1948 to 1954, and from 1960 to 1961. He was first elected to the 2nd Seanad in April 1938 by the Agricultural Panel, and was re-elected in August 1938.

He lost his seat at the 1943 Seanad election, but was re-elected at the 1948 election, and at the 1951 election. He lost his seat again at the 1954 election. He was elected to 9th Seanad at a by-election on 9 February 1960, replacing Patrick Baxter. He was defeated at the 1961 Seanad election.
