= Victor Boyhan =

Irish politician (born 1961)

Senator Victor Boyhan
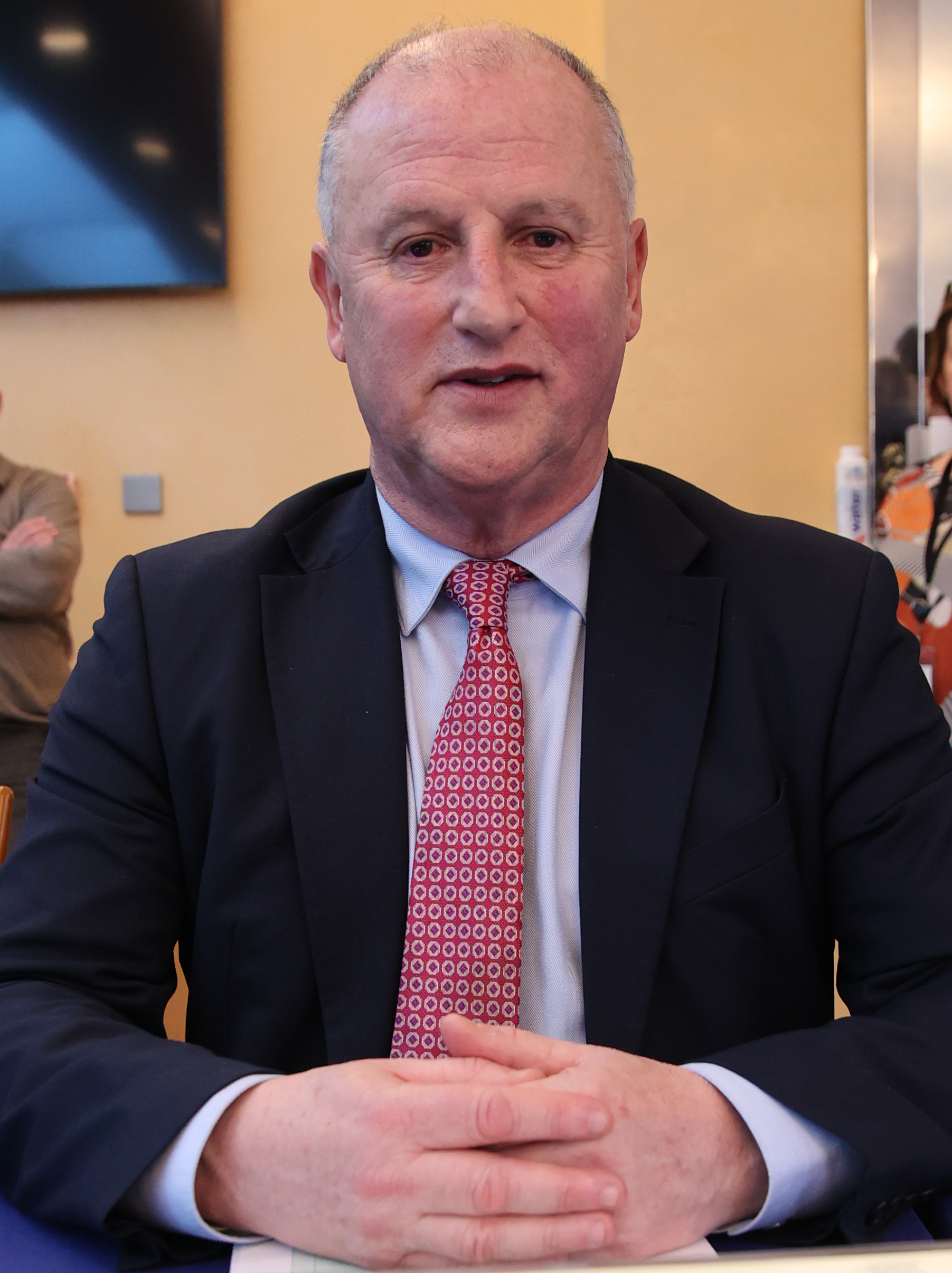
- Boyhan in 2025

Senator
- Incumbent
- Assumed office 8 June 2016
- Constituency: Agricultural Panel

Personal details
- Born: 30 April 1961 (age 65) Dún Laoghaire, Dublin, Ireland
- Party: Independent
- Other political affiliations: Progressive Democrats (1999–2004)
- Website: victorboyhan.ie

Victor Boyhan (born 30 April 1961) is an Irish independent politician who has served as a senator for the Agricultural Panel since April 2016.

He is a former member of Dún Laoghaire–Rathdown County Council. He was first elected to Dún Laoghaire–Rathdown County Council for the Blackrock area at the 1999 local elections as a Progressive Democrats candidate. He lost his seat at the 2004 local elections but was re-elected in 2009 and 2014 as an independent candidate. He previously contested the 2011 general election for the constituency of Dún Laoghaire as an independent candidate and the Cultural and Educational Panel at the 2011 Seanad election, both unsuccessfully.

Boyhan is a close friend of retired Irish soccer international Paul McGrath with whom he grew up in the "Birds Nest" home on York Road in Dún Laoghaire and later down in Monkstown. McGrath mentions him several times in his autobiography Back from the Brink and credits him with becoming one of the most outspoken voices in ensuring that Smyly Trust Homes would be covered under the State Redress Scheme, investigating the abuse of children.
