= Eileen Lynch =

Irish politician

Senator Eileen Lynch
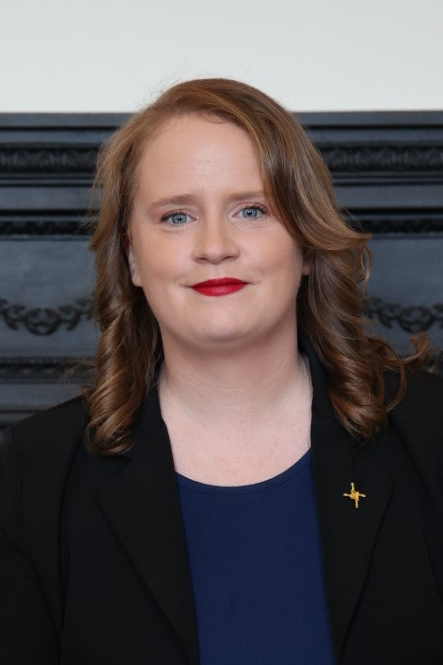
- Lynch in 2025

Senator
- Incumbent
- Assumed office January 2025
- Constituency: Agricultural Panel

Personal details
- Born: County Cork, Ireland
- Party: Fine Gael
- Education: University College Cork

Eileen Lynch is an Irish Fine Gael politician who has been a senator for the Agricultural Panel since January 2025.

She was a member of Cork County Council for the Macroom area from May 2019 to January 2025. She studied Law and Irish at University College Cork, and works as a solicitor in Cork city.

She was formerly Secretary General of Youth EPP, the youth wing of the European People's Party, and was appointed International Secretary of Fine Gael by Party Leader Simon Harris, in 2025.
