= Paul Daly (politician) =

Irish politician (born 1965)

Senator Paul Daly
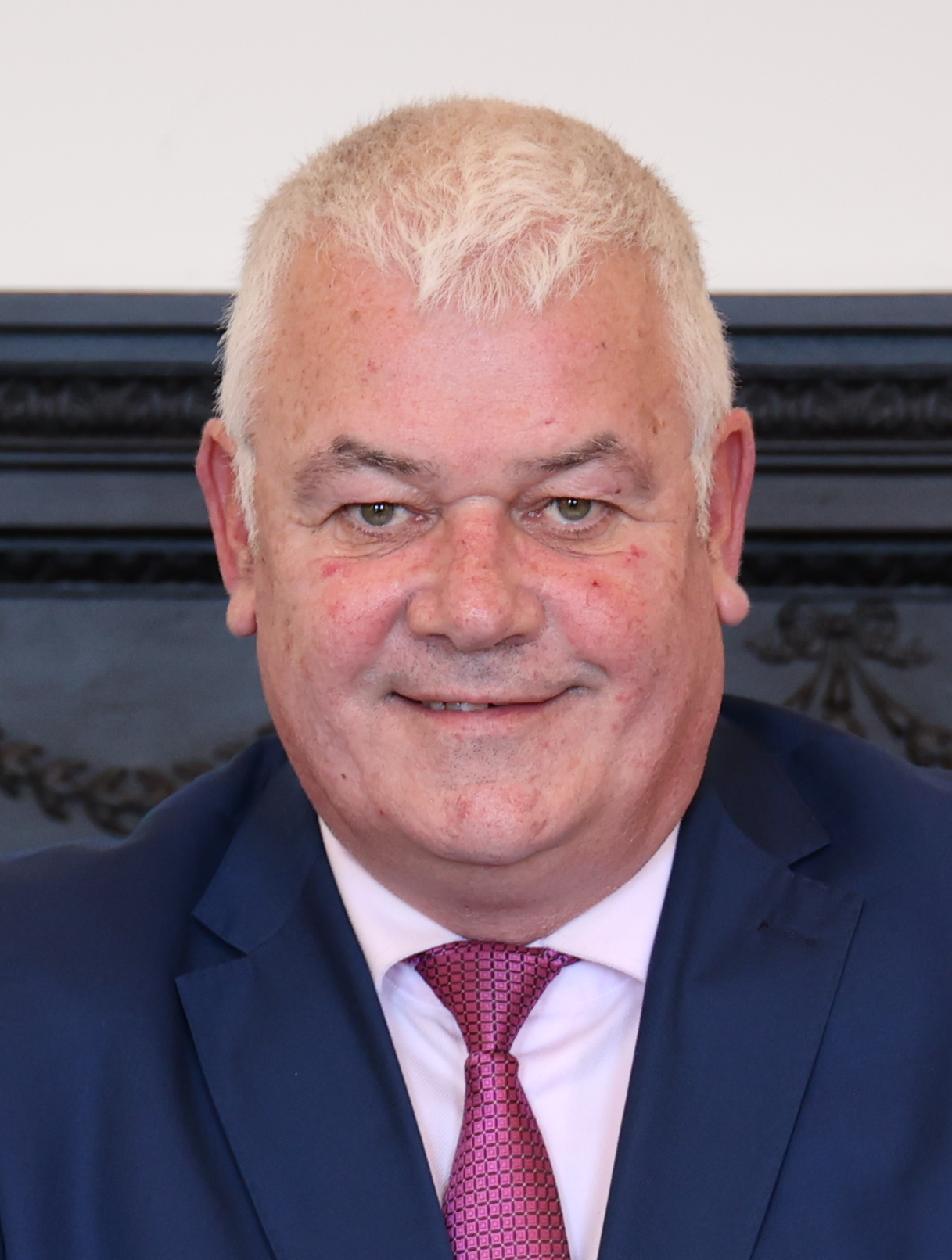
- Daly in 2025

Senator
- Incumbent
- Assumed office 8 June 2016
- Constituency: Agricultural Panel

Personal details
- Born: 26 June 1965 (age 60) Kilbeggan, County Westmeath, Ireland
- Party: Fianna Fáil

Paul Daly (born 26 June 1965) is an Irish Fianna Fáil politician who has served as a senator for the Agricultural Panel since April 2016.

He was a member of Westmeath County Council from 2008 to 2016. Daly served as Chairperson of the council from 2015 to 2016.

He is the Fianna Fáil Seanad spokesperson on Agriculture.

Following his involvement in the Oireachtas Golf Society scandal ("golfgate") in August 2020, Daly was one of six senators who lost the party whip in the Seanad as punishment for their actions.
