= Noel O'Donovan (politician) =

Irish politician

Senator Noel O'Donovan
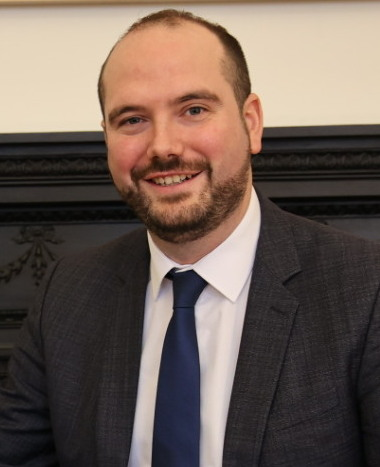
- O'Donovan in 2025

Senator
- Incumbent
- Assumed office 7 February 2025
- Constituency: Nominated by the Taoiseach

Personal details
- Party: Fine Gael

Noel O'Donovan is an Irish Fine Gael politician who has been a senator since February 2025 after being nominated by the Taoiseach.

He was a member of Cork County Council for the Skibbereen–West Cork area from June 2024 to February 2025. He was an unsuccessful candidate for the Cork South-West constituency at the 2024 general election. He contested the 2025 Seanad election for the Administrative Panel but was not elected.
