= Cappagh, County Limerick =

Parish in County Limerick, Ireland

Coordinates: 52°33′30″N 8°53′57″W

Cappagh (Irish: Ceapach) is a parish in west County Limerick, Ireland. The parish was previously known as Connello Lower and Nantenan, with the latter now a townland in the parish. It is surrounded by the parishes of Askeaton and Kilcornan (to the north), Rathkeale (to the south), Croagh (to the east), and Coolcappa (to the west). The patron saint of the parish is St. James.

The parish has no public house, post office, or shop, one of the few parishes in Limerick to be without any of these amenities.

== Community organisations ==
Organisations in the area include the:

- Cappagh GAA club. The club was formed in 1993 and only plays Gaelic football. Generally, most parishioners who play hurling play with neighbouring club Croagh-Kilfinny; similarly, Gaelic footballers in Croagh and Kilfinny play for Cappagh. The GAA field was purchased in 1997 and is now fully playable. At underage level, the club is joined with Rathkeale GAA club.
- LGFA (Ladies Gaelic Football Association) club was formed in 2017 for under 12 and under 14 girls.
- The handball club; the handball alley is located beside the community hall.
- Cappagh Women's Cave
- Cappagh Community Council
- Cappagh Drama Group

A number of now-defunct organisations were also in the parish:

- Cappagh Pipe Band
- Cumann Cultura
- Hurling Club
- ICA
- Muintir na Tíre
- Pioneer Total Abstinence Association
- Pitch and Putt Club

== Amenities and places of interest ==
Historic buildings in the area include:

- Cappagh Castle, which was built by the Normans. It was used in the mid-20th century as a playing venue by the local handball club. The castle is on private property and is not open to the public.
- St. James's National School, which was built in 1866 and is under the auspices of the Roman Catholic Church. The building was extended in 1988 and again in 2007 due to the continued growth in the population of the parish.
- The Parish Community Hall, which is owned by the parishioners.
- Cappagh Community Creche.

There are three churches in the parish:

- St. James' Catholic Church. Mass is held weekly, though there is no longer a parish priest in Cappagh.
- Nantenan Church and Cemetery. The church was used by both the Catholic and Anglican Churches at different stages in time. The cemetery is also mixed and is still open to the public, but the church is no longer in use. Adjacent to the church grounds is St. James's Well.
- The Embury Heck Methodist Church. The Methodist community in Cappagh can largely trace their origins to the German Palatines, who were granted refuge in Ireland by the English Crown in the 18th century, due to oppression in their homeland.

Other historical buildings and houses in the parish:

- Ballingrane Station House
- Ballinvirick House
- Cappagh House
- Curraheen House
- The Forge
- Kilbeha House
- Lee house
- Nantenan Glebe
- Nantenan House
- Old Parochial House
- The Stoney Man
- Stoneville House
