= 1999 Cork County Council election =

Part of the 1999 Irish local elections

- 10 June 1999

All 48 seats to Cork County Council
	First party	Second party	Third party
Party	Fine Gael	Fianna Fáil	Labour
Seats won	21	19	4
Seat change	+1	0	0
	Fourth party	Fifth party	Sixth party
Party	Progressive Democrats	Independent	Workers' Party
Seats won	1	3	0
Seat change	0	0	-1
- Map showing the area of Cork County Council
Council control after election
TBD

An election to Cork County Council took place on 10 June 1999 as part of that year's Irish local elections. 48 councillors were elected from ten local electoral areas on the system of proportional representation by means of the single transferable vote (PR-STV) for a five-year term of office.

== Results by party ==
Party	Seats	±	First Pref. votes	FPv%	±%
Fine Gael	21	+1	50,820	38.26	
Fianna Fáil	19	0	51,147	38.50	
Labour	4	0	13,520	10.18	
Progressive Democrats	1	0	3,406	2.56	
Independent	3	0	9,643	7.26	
Workers' Party	0	-1	N/A	N/A	
Totals	48	0	132,825	100.00	—

== Results by local electoral area ==
=== Bandon ===
Bandon - 3 seats
Party	Candidate	FPv%	Count			
Party	Candidate	FPv%	1	2	3	4
Fianna Fáil	Senator Peter Callanan*	30.98	3,372			
Fine Gael	Kevin Murphy*	20.86	2,271	2,340	2,884	
Fine Gael	Jerry McCarthy	18.27	1,989	2,120	2,391	2,473
Fianna Fáil	Alan Coleman*	16.15	1,758	2,128	2,467	2,547
Labour	Tomas O'Brien	8.87	966	993		
Green	Noel Giles	3.89	423	461		
Independent	Frank Collins	0.97	106	121		
Electorate: 18,853 Valid: 10,885 (57.74%) Spoilt: 167 Quota: 2,722 Turnout: 11,052 (58.62%)

=== Bantry ===
Bantry - 5 seats
Party	Candidate	FPv%	Count							
Party	Candidate	FPv%	1	2	3	4	5	6	7	8
Fianna Fáil	Senator Denis O'Donovan*	24.92	2,407							
Fine Gael	P.J. Sheehan TD*	12.24	1,888							
Fine Gael	Noel Harrington	16.05	1,550	1,595	1,681					
Fine Gael	John P. O'Shea	10.32	997	1,150	1,235	1,287	1,311	1,355	1,392	1,555
Fianna Fáil	Vivian O'Callaghan*	9.47	915	1,235	1,270	1,276	1,287	1,306	1,357	1,467
Fianna Fáil	Kevin O'Neill	9.30	898	1,045	1,057	1,059	1,063	1,132	1,232	1,277
Independent	Liam Ward	3.85	372	460	501	502	531	562	604	
Sinn Féin	Martin Ennis	2.62	253	276	280	281	303	347		
Labour	Michael O'Sullivan	2.17	210	224	235	238	289			
Green	Micky McBrearty	1.73	167	174	178	179				
Electorate: 15,553 Valid: 9,657 (62.09%) Spoilt: 182 Quota: 1,610 Turnout: 9,839 (63.26%)

=== Blarney ===
Blarney - 4 seats
Party	Candidate	FPv%	Count					
Party	Candidate	FPv%	1	2	3	4	5	6
Fianna Fáil	Dan Fleming*	18.34	2,138	2,256	2,312	2,409		
Fine Gael	Tomas Ryan*	16.97	1,978	2,029	2,238	2,539		
Fianna Fáil	Annette McNamara*	14.34	1,672	1,737	1,754	1,916	2,011	2,050
Fine Gael	Gerry Kelly	12.76	1,487	1,637	2,074	2,445		
Fianna Fáil	Tom Joyce	11.22	1,308	1,451	1,622	1,860	1,891	1,965
Labour	Sheila O'Sullivan*	10.46	1,219	1,351	1,510			
Fine Gael	Dan O'Shea	8.95	1,043	1,132				
Progressive Democrats	Michael Burns	6.97	813					
Electorate: 25,346 Valid: 11,658 (46.00%) Spoilt: 201 Quota: 2,332 Turnout: 11,859 (46.79%)

=== Carrigaline ===
Carrigaline - 7 seats
Party	Candidate	FPv%	Count										
Party	Candidate	FPv%	1	2	3	4	5	6	7	8	9	10	11
Fine Gael	Simon Coveney TD	19.94	3,933										
Fianna Fáil	Batt O'Keeffe TD*	15.93	3,141										
Fianna Fáil	Barry Cogan*	11.07	2,183	2,430	2,547								
Fianna Fáil	Deirdre Forde	9.12	1,799	1,884	1,965	1,999	2,084	2,104	2,197	2,293	2,502		
Fine Gael	Derry Canty*	7.02	1,385	1,609	1,739	1,746	1,763	1,974	2,147	2,190	2,313	2,851	
Labour	Paula Desmond*	6.85	1,351	1,593	1,626	1,630	1,683	1,937	2,025	2,187	2,280	2,507	
Progressive Democrats	Peter Kelly	6.66	1,313	1,387	1,404	1,406	1,504	1,519	1,614	1,669	1,720	1,773	1,905
Fianna Fáil	John O'Sullivan	4.34	856	876	983	1,000	1,128	1,138	1,162	1,240	1,453	1,489	1,534
Sinn Féin	Thomas Hanlon	3.68	725	758	775	778	823	837	845				
Fianna Fáil	John Whelton	3.65	719	747	862	869	882	905	917	953			
Fine Gael	Braham Brennan*	3.16	624	875	887	892	915	993	1,115	1,158	1,176		
Labour	Edward Dawson	2.95	581	611	643	645	683						
Independent	Michael O'Hanlon	2.93	578	598	606	606							
Fine Gael	Kate Horgan	2.71	534	747	753	753	776	792					
Electorate: 46,314 Valid: 19,722 (42.58%) Spoilt: 250 Quota: 2,466 Turnout: 19,972 (43.12%)

=== Fermoy ===
Fermoy - 4 seats
Party	Candidate	FPv%	Count				
Party	Candidate	FPv%	1	2	3	4	5
Fianna Fáil	Kevin O'Keeffe*	27.34	3,059				
Fianna Fáil	Frank O'Flynn	21.61	2,418				
Fine Gael	Aileen Pyne*	13.84	1,549	1,715	1,761	1,815	2,348
Fine Gael	James O'Connell	12.50	1,399	1,543	1,568	1,602	1,837
Fine Gael	P.J. Walsh	12.24	1,369	1,690	1,739	1,781	1,936
Independent	John Hussey	6.94	776	868	902	964	
Labour	Tadhg O'Donovan	3.43	384	443	455	476	
Christian Solidarity	Billy Fanning	2.10	235	274	288		
Electorate: 19,255 Valid: 11,189 (58.11%) Spoilt: 162 Quota: 2,238 Turnout: 11,351 (58.95%)

=== Kanturk ===
Kanturk - 5 seats
Party	Candidate	FPv%	Count			
Party	Candidate	FPv%	1	2	3	4
Fine Gael	Patrick Buckley	14.78	2,154	2,313	2,515	
Fine Gael	Gerard Murphy*	14.00	2,039	2,103	2,210	2,381
Fianna Fáil	Marie (The Shamrock) Murphy*	13.87	2,021	2,082	2,290	2,302
Fianna Fáil	Mike Donegan	11.87	1,730	1,784	1,929	2,411
Fianna Fáil	Jack Roche*	10.93	1,592	1,660	1,977	2,009
Fine Gael	Frank Crowley*	10.75	1,566	1,703	1,880	2.542
Fine Gael	Billy Biggane*	10.14	1,477	1,525	1,537	
Fianna Fáil	Laurence Kelly*	7.80	1,136	1,309		
Labour	Bill Cashin	4.70	685			
Natural Law	Patrick Murphy	0.62	91			
Green	Ted Bradley	0.54	78			
Electorate: 22,325 Valid: 14,569 (65.26%) Spoilt: 240 Quota: 2,429 Turnout: 14,809 (66.33%)

=== Macroom ===
Macroom - 3 seats
Party	Candidate	FPv%	Count		
Party	Candidate	FPv%	1	2	3
Fine Gael	Michael Creed TD*	31.28	3,212		
Fianna Fáil	Donal Moynihan TD*	25.87	2,657		
Fine Gael	Frank Metcalfe*	15.13	1,554	1,932	2,348
Labour	Martin Coughlan	14.99	1,539	1,745	2,106
Fianna Fáil	Padraig Murphy	12.74	1,308	1,368	
Electorate: 16,303 Valid: 10,270 (62.99%) Spoilt: 148 Quota: 2,568 Turnout: 10,418 (63.90%)

=== Mallow ===
Mallow - 4 seats
Party	Candidate	FPv%	Count					
Party	Candidate	FPv%	1	2	3	4	5	6
Fine Gael	Paul Bradford TD*	23.55	2,525					
Fianna Fáil	Dan Joe Fitzgerald	22.06	2,366					
Labour	Joe Sherlock*	21.26	2,280					
Fine Gael	Tom Sheahan*	15.75	1,689	1,885	1,921	2,025	2,062	2,358
Fianna Fáil	David Willis	10.53	1,129	1,228	1,382	1,463	1,533	1,615
Independent	Michael Broderick	3.97	426	479	499	548	576	
Green	Mary Sleeman-Power	2.87	308	340	351			
Electorate: 17,923 Valid: 10,723 (59.83%) Spoilt: 146 Quota: 2,145 Turnout: 10,869 (60.64%)

=== Midleton ===
Midleton - 6 seats
Party	Candidate	FPv%	Count									
Party	Candidate	FPv%	1	2	3	4	5	6	7	8	9	10
Labour	John Mulvihill*	15.40	2,821									
Independent	Noel Collins*	11.85	2,171	2,185	2,266	2,309	2,390	2,468	2,663			
Fine Gael	Michael Hegarty*	10.50	1,922	1,935	1,968	1,997	2,038	2,458	3,143			
Fianna Fáil	Maurice Ahern*	10.34	1,894	1,903	1,929	2,200	2,305	2,369	2,457	2,514	2,524	2,820
Fianna Fáil	Art Supple	8.49	1,555	1,555	1,584	1,671	1,780	1,922	1,952	1,980	1,984	2,077
Independent	Ted Murphy	7.04	1,290	1,296	1,347	1,369	1,425	1,494	1,641	1,803	1,829	1,920
Progressive Democrats	J.J. Flavin	6.99	1,280	1,284	1,306	1,327	1,408	1,520	1,550	1,607	1,611	1,671
Fine Gael	George Jeffrey	5.98	1,096	1,103	1,134	1,156	1,172	1,329				
Fine Gael	Mort Murphy	5.91	1,083	1,087	1,110	1,118	1,143					
Independent	Seán O'Connor	5.83	1,068	1,137	1,185	1,366	1,545	1,560	1,579	1,587	1,589	
Sinn Féin	Kieran McCarthy	4.61	845	868	914	960						
Fianna Fáil	Joe Dowling	4.38	803	839	866							
Green	Vincent Keaney	1.26	230	839	866							
Independent	Gerry O'Sullivan	0.86	158	159								
Independent	Christy Carr	0.53	97	99								
Electorate: 32,825 Valid: 18,313 (55.79%) Spoilt: 315 Quota: 2,617 Turnout: 18,628 (56.75%)

=== Skibbereen ===
Skibbereen - 7 seats
Party	Candidate	FPv%	Count							
Party	Candidate	FPv%	1	2	3	4	5	6	7	8
Independent	Christy O'Sullivan	15.86	2,510							
Fine Gael	Maura Cal McCarthy*	15.19	2,404							
Fianna Fáil	Donal O'Rourke*	14.83	2,348							
Fine Gael	Tadhg O'Donovan*	10.49	1,660	1,796	1,860	1,868	1,886	1,922	2,257	
Labour	Michael McCarthy	7.00	1,484	1,524	1,559	1,569	1,657	1,757	1,812	1,847
Fine Gael	John Collins	8.96	1,418	1,457	1,557	1,570	1,596	1,640	1,692	1,724
Fianna Fáil	Tom O'Neill*	7.12	1,127	1,218	1,242	1,356	1,378	1,498	1,869	1,935
Fine Gael	Jim O'Sullivan	6.41	1,015	1,080	1,240	1,331	1,354	1,543	1,574	1,598
Fianna Fáil	Frank Long	5.29	838	928	937	1,001	1,019	1,087		
Sinn Féin	Cionnaith O Suilleabhain	4.69	743	795	819	881	934			
Green	Kieran O'Leary	1.78	282	300	309	318				
Electorate: 24,833 Valid: 15,829 (63.74%) Spoilt: 243 Quota: 1,979 Turnout: 16,072 (64.72%)
