= Flor Crowley =

Irish politician (1934–1997)

Teachta Dála
- In office June 1981 – February 1982
- In office June 1969 – June 1977
- Constituency: Cork South-West
- In office April 1965 – June 1969
- Constituency: Cork Mid

Senator
- In office 13 May 1982 – 23 February 1983
- Constituency: Nominated by the Taoiseach
- In office 27 October 1977 – 11 June 1981
- Constituency: Cultural and Educational Panel

Personal details
- Born: 27 December 1934 Bandon, County Cork, Ireland
- Died: 16 May 1997 (aged 62) County Cork, Ireland
- Party: Fianna Fáil
- Spouse: Sally Crowley
- Children: 6, including Brian

Florence Crowley (27 December 1934 – 16 May 1997) was an Irish Fianna Fáil politician. He was a Teachta Dála (TD) for thirteen years, and a senator for five years.

== Family ==
An auctioneer from Bandon, County Cork, Crowley was an accomplished rugby player in his youth. He and his wife Sally had six children. Their son Brian Crowley served as a Fianna Fáil senator and MEP from 1993 to 2019.

== Political career ==
He stood unsuccessfully as a Fianna Fáil candidate for Dáil Éireann in the Cork Mid constituency at a by-election in March 1965, but won the seat at the 1965 general election in April. After boundary changes for the 1969 general election, he was re-elected in the new Cork South-West constituency, and held the seat at the 1973 general election. Meanwhile, he had been elected in 1967 as a member of both Cork City Council and Cork County Council, and after the 1971 local elections had remained a member only of the County Council.

He lost his seat at the 1977 general election. Fianna Fáil won a landslide victory, but it had fielded three candidates in Cork South-West and won only one seat. Crowley, the sitting TD, was beaten by his party colleague Joe Walsh. He was then elected to the 14th Seanad on the Cultural and Educational Panel, and at the 1981 general he regained his Dáil seat from Walsh. Walsh retook the seat at the February 1982 general election, following which Crowley stood in the Seanad elections on the Cultural and Educational Panel. However, he did not win a seat; at the time Fianna Fáil was deeply divided between supporters and opponents of its leader Charles Haughey, and the Haughey-supporting Crowley was beaten by another Fianna Fáil candidate, Séamus de Brún, who had previously been nominated by the Taoiseach, Jack Lynch to the 14th Seanad. Crowley was then nominated by Haughey to the 16th Seanad.

Crowley did not contest the November 1982 general election. In the subsequent February 1983 Seanad election, he stood as a candidate on the Administrative Panel, but did not win a seat.

== Death ==
Crowley died suddenly at his home in Bandon on 16 May 1997, aged 62.

== See also ==
- Families in the Oireachtas

Dáil	Election	Deputy (Party)	Deputy (Party)	Deputy (Party)	Deputy (Party)	Deputy (Party)
17th	1961	Dan Desmond (Lab)	Seán McCarthy (FF)	Con Meaney (FF)	Denis J. O'Sullivan (FG)	4 seats 1961–1977
17th	1965 by-election	Eileen Desmond (Lab)	Seán McCarthy (FF)	Con Meaney (FF)	Denis J. O'Sullivan (FG)	4 seats 1961–1977
18th	1965	Eileen Desmond (Lab)	Flor Crowley (FF)	Thomas Meaney (FF)	Donal Creed (FG)	4 seats 1961–1977
19th	1969	Philip Burton (FG)	Paddy Forde (FF)	Thomas Meaney (FF)	Donal Creed (FG)	4 seats 1961–1977
19th	1972 by-election	Philip Burton (FG)	Gene Fitzgerald (FF)	Thomas Meaney (FF)	Donal Creed (FG)	4 seats 1961–1977
20th	1973	Eileen Desmond (Lab)	Gene Fitzgerald (FF)	Thomas Meaney (FF)	Donal Creed (FG)	4 seats 1961–1977
21st	1977	Eileen Desmond (Lab)	Gene Fitzgerald (FF)	Thomas Meaney (FF)	Donal Creed (FG)	Barry Cogan (FF)
22nd	1981	Constituency abolished. See Cork North-Central and Cork South-Central				

Dáil	Election	Deputy (Party)	Deputy (Party)	Deputy (Party)
17th	1961	Seán Collins (FG)	Michael Pat Murphy (Lab)	Edward Cotter (FF)
18th	1965	Seán Collins (FG)	Michael Pat Murphy (Lab)	Edward Cotter (FF)
19th	1969	John O'Sullivan (FG)	Michael Pat Murphy (Lab)	Flor Crowley (FF)
20th	1973	John O'Sullivan (FG)	Michael Pat Murphy (Lab)	Flor Crowley (FF)
21st	1977	Jim O'Keeffe (FG)	Michael Pat Murphy (Lab)	Joe Walsh (FF)
22nd	1981	Jim O'Keeffe (FG)	P. J. Sheehan (FG)	Flor Crowley (FF)
23rd	1982 (Feb)	Jim O'Keeffe (FG)	P. J. Sheehan (FG)	Joe Walsh (FF)
24th	1982 (Nov)	Jim O'Keeffe (FG)	P. J. Sheehan (FG)	Joe Walsh (FF)
25th	1987	Jim O'Keeffe (FG)	P. J. Sheehan (FG)	Joe Walsh (FF)
26th	1989	Jim O'Keeffe (FG)	P. J. Sheehan (FG)	Joe Walsh (FF)
27th	1992	Jim O'Keeffe (FG)	P. J. Sheehan (FG)	Joe Walsh (FF)
28th	1997	Jim O'Keeffe (FG)	P. J. Sheehan (FG)	Joe Walsh (FF)
29th	2002	Jim O'Keeffe (FG)	Denis O'Donovan (FF)	Joe Walsh (FF)
30th	2007	Jim O'Keeffe (FG)	P. J. Sheehan (FG)	Christy O'Sullivan (FF)
31st	2011	Jim Daly (FG)	Noel Harrington (FG)	Michael McCarthy (Lab)
32nd	2016	Jim Daly (FG)	Michael Collins (Ind.)	Margaret Murphy O'Mahony (FF)
33rd	2020	Holly Cairns (SD)	Michael Collins (Ind.)	Christopher O'Sullivan (FF)
34th	2024	Holly Cairns (SD)	Michael Collins (II)	Christopher O'Sullivan (FF)
