= Mark Daly (politician) =

Irish politician (born 1973)

Senator Mark Daly
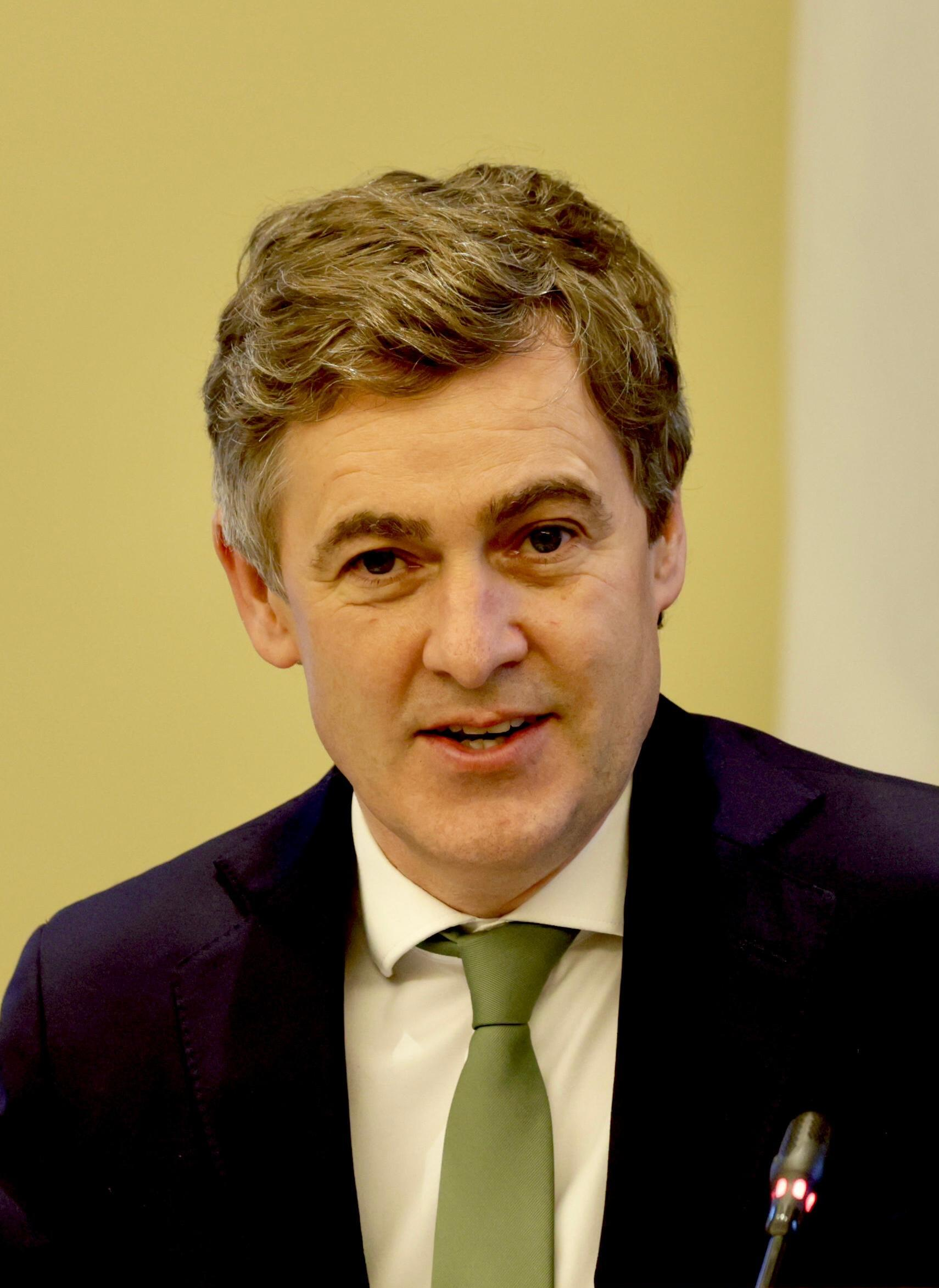
- Daly in 2025

Cathaoirleach of Seanad Éireann
- Incumbent
- Assumed office 12 February 2025
- Deputy: Maria Byrne
- Preceded by: Jerry Buttimer
- In office 29 June 2020 – 16 December 2022
- Deputy: Jerry Buttimer; Joe O'Reilly
- Preceded by: Denis O'Donovan
- Succeeded by: Jerry Buttimer

Leas-Chathaoirleach of Seanad Éireann
- In office 16 December 2022 – 12 February 2025
- Cathaoirleach: Jerry Buttimer
- Preceded by: Joe O'Reilly
- Succeeded by: Maria Byrne

Senator
- Incumbent
- Assumed office 13 September 2007
- Constituency: Administrative Panel

Personal details
- Born: 12 March 1973 (age 53) Cork, Ireland
- Party: Fianna Fáil
- Education: Dublin Institute of Technology; University of Greenwich; Harvard Kennedy School
- Website: senatormarkdaly.org

Mark Daly (born 12 March 1973) is an Irish Fianna Fáil politician who has served as Cathaoirleach of Seanad Éireann since 12 February 2025. He previously served as Leas-Chathaoirleach of Seanad Éireann from December 2022 to February 2025 and as Cathaoirleach of Seanad Éireann from June 2020 to December 2022. He has served as a senator for the Administrative Panel since July 2007.

== Early and personal life ==
Daly was born in Cork in 1973, but is a native of Kenmare, County Kerry. He is a qualified estate agent. He finished third on the RTÉ reality television show Treasure Island in 2002.

== Political career ==
He previously worked as an assistant to MEP Brian Crowley. Daly was previously Seanad spokesperson for Fianna Fáil on Overseas Development and deputy spokesperson on Innovation, Office of Public Works and Youth Affairs. He is also a member of the Joint Oireachtas Foreign Affairs Committee and a member of the Foreign affairs Committee on human rights. He was the spokesperson for Irish Overseas and Diaspora. He is a member of the All-Party Decade of Commemorations working group.

On 30 May 2010, he was one of three Irish politicians who were prevented by authorities from leaving Cyprus to join an international flotilla carrying aid to the besieged Gaza Strip.

In 2011, he was appointed Fianna Fáil Seanad spokesperson on Communications, Energy and Natural Resources.

Daly succeeded in having the Seanad recalled from its 2013 summer recess in an unprecedented debate to discuss an EU directive transposed into Irish law by Minister for Health James Reilly without debate in the Dáil or Seanad. The vote was tied and won by the Government through the casting vote of the Cathaoirleach of the Seanad. Alex White, Minister of State at the Department of Health, told the chamber that no case had been made of any strength why the legislation should be annulled. The government dismissed the recall as a "stunt".

In 2018 Daly travelled with Eamon O Cuiv to Omagh to endorse the campaign of Independent and former Sinn Féin Cllr Sorcha McAnespy who had joined the Fianna Fáil party and who sought to contest the 2019 Fermanagh and Omagh District Council election for the party as an approved candidate. Party President Micheal Martin and Party HQ in Mount Street vehemently opposed this initiative about contesting elections in Northern Ireland and summarily sacked Daly from his position as Deputy Leader in the Seanad as a result. McAnespy later resigned from Fianna Fáil.

In Seanad Eireann Daly has worked to implement the Irish Sign Language Act and from 2017-20 he published 6 Reports on the topic of Uniting Ireland, Brexit and the future of Ireland and Uniting Ireland and its people in peace and prosperity the first such report by a Dáil and Seanad Committee.

Oireachtas
Preceded by Denis O'Donovan	Cathaoirleach of Seanad Éireann; 2020–2022	Succeeded by Jerry Buttimer
