= Christy O'Sullivan =

Irish former politician (born 1948)

Teachta Dála
- In office May 2007 – February 2011
- Constituency: Cork South-West

Personal details
- Born: 27 November 1948 (age 77) Clonakilty, County Cork, Ireland
- Party: Fianna Fáil
- Spouse: Paddi O'Connell
- Children: Christopher O'Sullivan

Christy O'Sullivan (born 27 November 1948) is an Irish former Fianna Fáil politician. He was a Teachta Dála (TD) for the Cork South-West constituency from 2007 to 2011.

From Clonakilty in County Cork, O'Sullivan first stood for public office at the 1999 local elections, when he stood as Independent in the Skibbereen local electoral area and won a seat on Cork County Council. He contested the 2002 general election in Cork South-West as an independent, when he won over 10% of the votes but was not elected.

He was re-elected to the County Council at the 2004 local elections, and in January 2007 he joined Fianna Fáil, and was imposed as a Fianna Fáil candidate for the 2007 general election, without a selection conference. His popularity as a local councillor was hoped to strengthen the party's hopes of retaining the two seats which it had won in the three-seat constituency in 2002, and O'Sullivan was seen as a strong candidate to succeed Joe Walsh, who was retiring after 30 years in Dáil Éireann.

The strategy partly worked. Fianna Fáil increased its share of the vote, with O'Sullivan topping the poll, and he was the first candidate to win a seat. However, his colleague Denis O'Donovan, who had won a seat from Fine Gael in 2002, was defeated after just one term in the Dáil.

Under the Local Government Act 2001, O'Sullivan vacated his council seat when elected to the Dáil. His son Christopher was then co-opted to the County Council in his place. His son then spent half of 2008 travelling the world as a tourist whilst claiming a total of €30,000 in expenses as a councillor.

He was arrested on suspicion of drink driving on 2 June 2008, he has apologised after failing a breath test near Clonakilty. On 4 November 2008, he was banned for driving for 1 year and fined €300 after pleading guilty to a charge of drink driving.

He lost his seat at the 2011 general election. His son Christopher O'Sullivan was elected as a TD for Cork South-West at the 2020 general election.

== See also ==
- Families in the Oireachtas

| Dáil | Election | Deputy (Party) | Deputy (Party) | Deputy (Party) |
|---|---|---|---|---|
| 17th | 1961 | Seán Collins (FG) | Michael Pat Murphy (Lab) | Edward Cotter (FF) |
| 18th | 1965 | Seán Collins (FG) | Michael Pat Murphy (Lab) | Edward Cotter (FF) |
| 19th | 1969 | John O'Sullivan (FG) | Michael Pat Murphy (Lab) | Flor Crowley (FF) |
| 20th | 1973 | John O'Sullivan (FG) | Michael Pat Murphy (Lab) | Flor Crowley (FF) |
| 21st | 1977 | Jim O'Keeffe (FG) | Michael Pat Murphy (Lab) | Joe Walsh (FF) |
| 22nd | 1981 | Jim O'Keeffe (FG) | P. J. Sheehan (FG) | Flor Crowley (FF) |
| 23rd | 1982 (Feb) | Jim O'Keeffe (FG) | P. J. Sheehan (FG) | Joe Walsh (FF) |
| 24th | 1982 (Nov) | Jim O'Keeffe (FG) | P. J. Sheehan (FG) | Joe Walsh (FF) |
| 25th | 1987 | Jim O'Keeffe (FG) | P. J. Sheehan (FG) | Joe Walsh (FF) |
| 26th | 1989 | Jim O'Keeffe (FG) | P. J. Sheehan (FG) | Joe Walsh (FF) |
| 27th | 1992 | Jim O'Keeffe (FG) | P. J. Sheehan (FG) | Joe Walsh (FF) |
| 28th | 1997 | Jim O'Keeffe (FG) | P. J. Sheehan (FG) | Joe Walsh (FF) |
| 29th | 2002 | Jim O'Keeffe (FG) | Denis O'Donovan (FF) | Joe Walsh (FF) |
| 30th | 2007 | Jim O'Keeffe (FG) | P. J. Sheehan (FG) | Christy O'Sullivan (FF) |
| 31st | 2011 | Jim Daly (FG) | Noel Harrington (FG) | Michael McCarthy (Lab) |
| 32nd | 2016 | Jim Daly (FG) | Michael Collins (Ind.) | Margaret Murphy O'Mahony (FF) |
| 33rd | 2020 | Holly Cairns (SD) | Michael Collins (Ind.) | Christopher O'Sullivan (FF) |
| 34th | 2024 | Holly Cairns (SD) | Michael Collins (II) | Christopher O'Sullivan (FF) |
