= Holly Cairns =

Irish politician (born 1989)

Holly Cairns TD
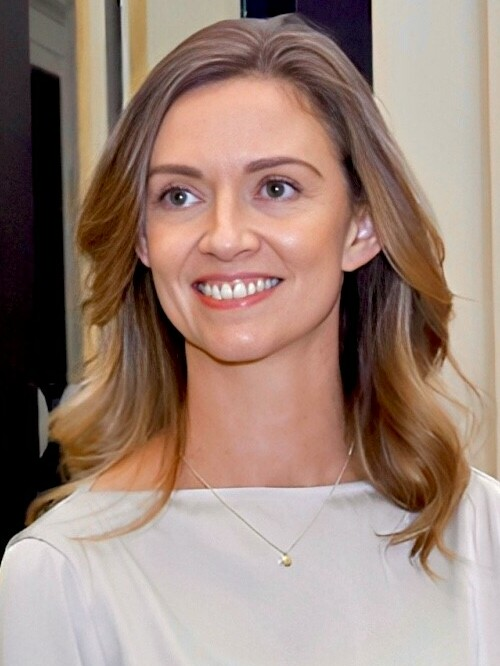
- Cairns in 2023

Leader of the Social Democrats
- Incumbent
- Assumed office 1 March 2023
- Deputy: Cian O'Callaghan
- Preceded by: Róisín Shortall & Catherine Murphy

Teachta Dála
- Incumbent
- Assumed office February 2020
- Constituency: Cork South-West

Personal details
- Born: 4 November 1989 (age 37) Cork, Ireland
- Party: Social Democrats
- Domestic partner: Barry Looney
- Children: 2
- Education: University College Cork

Holly Cairns (born 4 November 1989), also known as Holly McKeever Cairns, is an Irish politician who has been leader of the Social Democrats party since March 2023. She has been a Teachta Dála (TD) for Cork South-West since the 2020 general election. She was a member of Cork County Council for the Bantry local electoral area from 2019 to 2020.

== Early life ==
Born on a farm in West Cork, Cairns is a farmer working in the family business, Brown Envelope Seeds, producing organic seeds. She has a first-class honours MSc in Organic Horticulture from University College Cork. Her mother, Madeline McKeever, contested the 2004 Skibbereen Town Council election as a Green Party candidate. McKeever, described as an environmental activist by Alannah Hopkin in her book West Cork: The People and the Place, was arrested in 2003 alongside Quentin Gargan for selling home produce on the street in Skibbereen. A subsequent court case found that their market stalls were legal, to the benefit of other would-be market traders. Cairns attended Lisheen National School and lives in Turk Head, Aughadown.

During the 2010s Cairns lived abroad, spending some time working in an orphanage in Romania before moving to Malta for four years. There, Cairns worked for a charity organisation called INSPIRE which provides educational, therapeutic and leisure services to children and adults with intellectual, developmental and physical disabilities.

== Early political career ==
Cairns first entered politics as an activist interested in LGBT rights, canvassing on behalf of David Norris during the 2011 Irish presidential election. Following a period living abroad in Malta, Cairns returned to Ireland and joined the Together for Yes campaign during the referendum on repealing the Eighth Amendment, the amendment which forbade abortion in Ireland in almost all circumstances. Cairns' experience during this time prompted her to join the Social Democrats in 2018. She was one of the founding members of the West Cork branch of the party.

=== Cork County Council (2019–2020) ===
Cairns was elected to Cork County Council for the Bantry–West Cork local electoral area in the 2019 local elections, winning the last seat by a single vote, after several rechecks and a recount. She ran on a platform opposing the establishment of a plastics factory in Skibbereen. Following the election she was offered a year as mayor by the Fine Gael party in return for support, which she turned down.

During her time as a councillor, she produced the Inside the Chamber podcast about local government and campaigned for greater transparency in local government. In 2019, she proposed a motion for councillors to receive documents three days before voting, which was passed. She later revealed that Council staff had expressed concerns about the motion's tone. Despite this, she defended her position, criticising the late distribution of documents as hindering the work of councillors. She was supported by Catherine Murphy TD. She was a member of the executive committee of Carbery Housing Association until her election to the Dáil.

== National politics ==
=== TD (2020–present) ===
==== Election ====
Cairns contested the 2020 general election as a candidate in the Cork South West constituency. She was listed by The Irish Mirror as the youngest Social Democrats candidate, being 30 years old. She was reported by The Guardian to be running against her then boyfriend, Christopher O'Sullivan of the Fianna Fáil party, and as saying "I feel a bit like I'm in a badly written rom-com". She was elected, taking the third and final seat, receiving 4,696 (10.59%) first preference votes, the fifth highest amount overall. Heading into the eighth count, Cairns was 2,078 votes behind Fine Gael senator Tim Lombard, but Councillor Paul Hayes of the Sinn Féin party saw 3,023 of his transfers go to her and 393 to Lombard, before being deemed elected with 10,078 votes. Cairns was the only female TD elected in all of Cork City and county. She then became the Social Democrat Spokesperson for Agriculture, Food and the Marine; Further and Higher Education; and Disability.

==== As a TD ====
In March 2020, the family farm organisation, the Irish Creamery Milk Suppliers Association (ICMSA), criticised Cairns for "airy-fairy criticism" of dairy export sectors. Eileen Calnan, Chairperson of the West Cork ICMSA, said that she was "somewhat taken aback" by what she called Deputy Cairns' "lukewarm and half-hearted" support of the local dairy sector in an interview on RTÉ Radio 1's "Countrywide" programme. Cairns replied that as farmers, herself and Ms Calnan had more in common than they had to differ on. "I'm glad that we can agree on the most important thing of all: that farmers must be paid a fair price for their product. What I don't agree with is the notion that it's 'airy-fairy' to acknowledge that there are many aspects of the way we do things right now that are not sustainable. It's unreasonable to think the sector isn't vulnerable and doesn't need more robust support in the face of climate change... before this election, Ms Calnan said farmers didn't want politicians who just told them what they thought they wanted to hear. I am delighted to be able to say that that is a promise I will always be able to keep." Also in March, speaking on the fishing industry, Cairns called on Minister Michael Creed to set up a task force involving all stakeholders, from those fishing to the processors and retailers.

In April 2021, Cairns advocated to the Minister with responsibility for mental health, Mary Butler, on behalf of a constituent who feared she would die unless she could receive in-patient treatment for her anorexia and bulimia. Cairns said she was "begging" the Minister to personally intervene in the matter. Cairns noted that she had previously discovered through parliamentary questions that no funding was allocated under the National Eating Disorder Plan for the year 2020 and that none of the €1.6 million allocated for 2019 was spent at all. Cairns called on the government to remedy this, while her Social Democrats colleague Gary Gannon tabled a motion to ensure that funds already allocated for treating eating disorders are ring-fenced for that purpose and not siphoned off to other areas.

In May 2021, she questioned the taoiseach, Micheál Martin, after he publicly encouraged An Taisce to withdraw an appeal against the construction of a €140 million cheese factory in County Kilkenny. Cairns suggested that the factory would be a means for the Dutch to keep profiting from dairy products while cutting their herd numbers to meet environmental standards, using Ireland as a proxy; "I presume you're aware Glanbia is in partnership with a Dutch company. And in the past few years, Holland has reduced its herd by 190,000, while we have increased ours by half a million. It seems Holland has actively found a country with low environmental standards and low milk prices. You have framed this development of profits going abroad as a positive step for Irish agriculture. [Irish] Farmers deserve more respect". Cairns also pointed out that in a previous exchange in the Dáil, Martin had told Cairns it was inappropriate for government members to intervene in planning issues when she suggested a development on the site of the mother and baby home at Bessborough, County Cork. Martin responded that "politicians every day of the week write to planning authorities. They are entitled to make observations. That's a fact."

==== Mother and Baby Homes legislation ====
In October 2020, Cairns criticised the Commission of Investigation (Mother and Baby Homes and certain related Matters) Records, and another Matter, Bill 2020 proposed by the government. The bill was criticised for not facilitating access by survivors of the institutions to their personal data and maintaining the thirty-year seal of records from the commission's investigations. Cairns raised the issues with the sealing of the archive in the Dáil. She was especially critical of the Government's unwillingness to take on any of the amendments from the oppositions, especially as the minister had not engaged with the Collaborative Forum for Survivors. After the Dáil voted in favour of the legislation, she commented that "I am sick to my stomach that the State has let the survivors down yet again ... The amount of emails, phone calls, and letters I have had on the Mother and Baby Homes Records is overwhelming. People want justice and accountability for the survivors of these horrific institutions." After the bill was enacted, she received a commitment from the taoiseach, Micheál Martin, that survivors would be able to get access to their records.

==== Greyhound debate ====
In November 2020, Cairns opposed a parliamentary motion to allocate state funding to the greyhound racing industry. Wayne McCarthy, a board member of Greyhound Racing Ireland, referred to her as an "ignorant little girl" on Twitter. His Twitter post was then "liked" by Joe Carey, who later apologised to Cairns, saying he was wrong to like the tweet. Minister for Agriculture, Food and the Marine, Charlie McConalogue, described McCarthy's remarks as "sexist and offensive" and "not acceptable". Speaking in the Dáil, Cairns said that she did not want to use her Dáil speaking time to address what she called "this everyday sexism", but that it cannot be ignored, and she invited McCarthy to a public debate in relation to funding the greyhound racing industry. Despite Cairns' lobbying, in 2021 the Fianna Fáil Minister for Agriculture Charlie McConalogue committed €19.2 million in taxpayer money to funding greyhound racing.

=== Leader of the Social Democrats (2023–present) ===
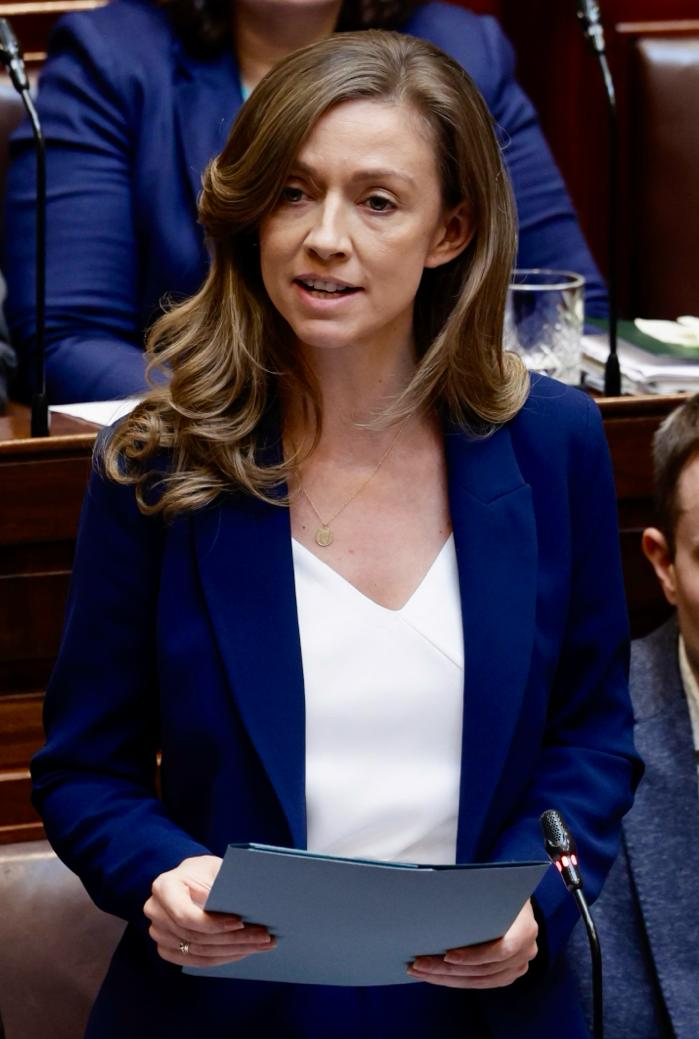
Cairns speaking in the Dáil in 2024

Cairns announced on 26 February 2023, that she would run for leader of Social Democrats. Nominations were due to close on 1 March, but none of the other TDs within the party chose to run in the election and as result she was announced as the new leader. She took over leadership of the party on 1 March 2023. Upon her promotion, she reiterated that the Social Democrats have no interest in merging with the Labour Party, and that housing and Sláintecare would be red line issues for the Social Democrats in any coalition talks with any party. The first poll taken after she was elected leader showed that the party's support had more than doubled to 9%.

Cairns was re-elected at the 2024 general election with an increased voteshare of 19.9%. She was the only woman elected in any Cork constituency at that election. Under her leadership, the Social Democrats almost doubled its number of TDs, going from 6 to 11, tying with Labour to become the fourth-largest party in Ireland. She took a maternity leave for a short period after the election before returning to her position as TD and party leader on 17 September 2025.

== Political views ==
Cairns is a proponent of Sláintecare, aiming for an "Irish NHS" to address the failures of the current healthcare system. She advocates for decisive action on climate change, asserting that the existential threat it poses must not be ignored. Cairns has called housing in Ireland a "national crisis" and supports policies such as a significant hike in Vacant House Tax to address the housing shortage.

=== Social policy ===
Cairns is an advocate of secularism in education and advocates for separating religion from schools, calling for fact-based sex education rather than religiously influenced teachings. Cairns supports the idea of the church being held financially responsible for its historical wrongdoings, including using its land assets to compensate victims of clerical abuse and fund housing projects. Cairns is critical of Direct Provision, acknowledging the necessity of adjusting the system due to the influx of refugees, but urging the government to set clear new targets. She has equated Direct Provision with Magdalene laundries, stressing the urgent need for reform. When discussing protests against refugees, Cairns has acknowledged the rise of far-right sentiments in Ireland. She advocates for dispelling misinformation while promoting empathy for asylum seekers.

Cairns has stated that she supports the decriminalisation of drugs, emphasising the need for a compassionate approach to addiction. Cairns is a proponent of gender quotas in politics, believing women face structural barriers when entering political office. She believes in inclusive politics, engaging with marginalised communities, including Travellers and disabled people, and has stressed the importance of ensuring that politics is accessible to all. Cairns supports transgender rights, advocating for self-identification and tailored approaches to issues like prison placement for trans individuals.

=== Defence and foreign policy ===
Cairns believes in maintaining Ireland's neutrality but has called for better investment in the defence forces, particularly for peacekeeping missions. She has also called for improved pay and conditions for the Irish military to better support their work.

Cairns has expressed support for Palestine, accusing Israel of committing war crimes and encouraging Western leaders to call for a ceasefire. In the aftermath of the Israeli invasion of the Gaza Strip, the Social Democrats called for the expulsion of the Israeli ambassador to Ireland, Dana Erlich. Cairns called the European Union's response to the war "despicable" and has accused the Irish government of being complicit in genocide by allowing military aircraft carrying bombs to pass through Irish airspace and maintaining normal diplomatic and trade relations with Israel. She has criticised the government's refusal to call Israel's actions in Gaza a genocide and its failure to take stronger actions, such as imposing sanctions. Cairns believes Ireland should not facilitate violence and must adopt, in her view, a more principled stance in line with its neutrality and moral obligations.

== Harassment ==
In January 2023, she disclosed that for six months the previous year, she received harassment from an online stalker that eventually escalated to the stalker showing up at her home in West Cork on multiple occasions. She made the disclosure after a number of other Irish women in politics such as Jennifer Carroll MacNeill stated that they had been harassed for being women in the public eye, including being stalked in person as well.

== Personal life ==
Cairns's brother Sam died from a drug overdose in 2019, six weeks after her election to Cork County Council. She later stated that she had been unaware of the issues her brother was dealing with.

She was in a relationship with fellow Cork TD Christopher O'Sullivan of Fianna Fáil but the couple ended their relationship in 2020. She stated that social media pressure for Cairns and O'Sullivan to answer for each other's political decisions had affected their relationship.

On 15 June 2024, she announced that she and her partner, hotelier Barry Looney, were expecting a baby girl. She stated that she was "overjoyed", having had two miscarriages the previous year. She announced that the Social Democrats' deputy leader, Cian O'Callaghan, would lead the party during her maternity leave. She also criticised the lack of formal arrangements for TDs to take maternity leave. She gave birth to a girl on 29 November 2024, the day of voting in the 2024 Irish general election. On 4 June 2026, Cairns announced that she and Looney were expecting their second child. She gave birth to a boy on 20 November 2026.

Dáil	Election	Deputy (Party)	Deputy (Party)	Deputy (Party)
17th	1961	Seán Collins (FG)	Michael Pat Murphy (Lab)	Edward Cotter (FF)
18th	1965	Seán Collins (FG)	Michael Pat Murphy (Lab)	Edward Cotter (FF)
19th	1969	John O'Sullivan (FG)	Michael Pat Murphy (Lab)	Flor Crowley (FF)
20th	1973	John O'Sullivan (FG)	Michael Pat Murphy (Lab)	Flor Crowley (FF)
21st	1977	Jim O'Keeffe (FG)	Michael Pat Murphy (Lab)	Joe Walsh (FF)
22nd	1981	Jim O'Keeffe (FG)	P. J. Sheehan (FG)	Flor Crowley (FF)
23rd	1982 (Feb)	Jim O'Keeffe (FG)	P. J. Sheehan (FG)	Joe Walsh (FF)
24th	1982 (Nov)	Jim O'Keeffe (FG)	P. J. Sheehan (FG)	Joe Walsh (FF)
25th	1987	Jim O'Keeffe (FG)	P. J. Sheehan (FG)	Joe Walsh (FF)
26th	1989	Jim O'Keeffe (FG)	P. J. Sheehan (FG)	Joe Walsh (FF)
27th	1992	Jim O'Keeffe (FG)	P. J. Sheehan (FG)	Joe Walsh (FF)
28th	1997	Jim O'Keeffe (FG)	P. J. Sheehan (FG)	Joe Walsh (FF)
29th	2002	Jim O'Keeffe (FG)	Denis O'Donovan (FF)	Joe Walsh (FF)
30th	2007	Jim O'Keeffe (FG)	P. J. Sheehan (FG)	Christy O'Sullivan (FF)
31st	2011	Jim Daly (FG)	Noel Harrington (FG)	Michael McCarthy (Lab)
32nd	2016	Jim Daly (FG)	Michael Collins (Ind.)	Margaret Murphy O'Mahony (FF)
33rd	2020	Holly Cairns (SD)	Michael Collins (Ind.)	Christopher O'Sullivan (FF)
34th	2024	Holly Cairns (SD)	Michael Collins (II)	Christopher O'Sullivan (FF)
