= Michael McCarthy (Irish politician) =

Irish former politician (born 1976)

Teachta Dála
- In office February 2011 – February 2016
- Constituency: Cork South-West

Senator
- In office 12 September 2002 – 25 February 2011
- Constituency: Labour Panel

Personal details
- Born: 15 November 1976 (age 49) Dunmanway, County Cork, Ireland
- Party: Labour Party
- Spouse: Nollagh McCarthy (m. 2007)
- Children: 2
- Relatives: Michael Calnan (cousin)
- Education: Cork Institute of Technology

Michael McCarthy (born 15 November 1976) is an Irish former Labour Party politician who served as a Teachta Dála (TD) for the Cork South-West constituency from 2011 to 2016. He was a Senator for the Labour Panel from 2002 to 2011 and previously served as a local councillor on Cork County Council from 1999 to 2003.

He was the Labour Party spokesperson on Marine, and in the Seanad served as spokesperson on Agriculture, Community and Rural Affairs, as well as Communications, Marine and Natural Resources.

== Early life ==
McCarthy grew up in Dunmanway. He is a graduate of Cork Institute of Technology. At the time of the 1999 local elections, he was employed at the Schering Plough pharmaceutical plant in Brinny, West Cork.

== Political career ==
=== County councillor ===
He was elected to Cork County Council in 1999 for the Skibbereen area, serving until 2003, having to resign as a sitting Oireachtas member as a result of the abolition of the dual mandate.

=== Oireachtas ===
McCarthy was an unsuccessful Labour candidate for the Cork South-West constituency in both the 2002 and 2007 general elections. He was elected to Seanad Éireann in 2002 by the Labour Panel, becoming the only Labour candidate elected from that panel. He was re-elected in 2007 and served in the Seanad until 2011. He was elected to the Dáil at the 2011 general election with 14% of the first-preference votes.

In 2012, he chaired a joint committee on the Environment, Culture and Gaeltacht. In 2013, McCarthy opposed the Government's referendum to abolish the Seanad, despite Labour's role in the coalition and risked losing the party whip as a result.

As chair of the Oireachtas environment committee, he oversaw discussions on proposed climate change legislation. The committee was divided over whether the legislation should include binding targets for emissions reductions by 2050. The draft report, prepared with input from the National Economic and Social Council, received public attention before its official publication.

In 2014, McCarthy contested the deputy leadership of the Labour Party, but Alan Kelly was elected to the position.

During this period, McCarthy chaired both the Local Government Efficiency Review (LGER) and its Implementation Group, and also served as chair of the Oireachtas committee on housing. In December 2014, he was among a number of Labour TDs who missed a Dáil vote on a bill to repeal the 8th Amendment.

McCarthy lost his seat at the 2016 general election, after his vote dropped from 14% in 2011 to 7% in 2016. Reflecting on his political career, he told The Irish Times that "longevity in politics was no longer guaranteed", and later confirmed to The Southern Star that he had left public life. In 2016, as chair of the Joint Committee on Environment, Culture and the Gaeltacht, he supported a project to establish a library at the London Irish Centre, which resulted in the donation of over 10,000 books and publications.

=== After politics ===
After leaving electoral politics, McCarthy held several roles in the renewable energy, housing and public policy sectors. In 2017, he became CEO of the Irish Solar Energy Association. He later joined the board of Sophia Housing, a national charity. In 2018, he was appointed chair of the National Oversight and Audit Commission. Since 2021, he has served as director of Cloud Infrastructure Ireland, a trade association within the employer group Ibec.

Dáil	Election	Deputy (Party)	Deputy (Party)	Deputy (Party)
17th	1961	Seán Collins (FG)	Michael Pat Murphy (Lab)	Edward Cotter (FF)
18th	1965	Seán Collins (FG)	Michael Pat Murphy (Lab)	Edward Cotter (FF)
19th	1969	John O'Sullivan (FG)	Michael Pat Murphy (Lab)	Flor Crowley (FF)
20th	1973	John O'Sullivan (FG)	Michael Pat Murphy (Lab)	Flor Crowley (FF)
21st	1977	Jim O'Keeffe (FG)	Michael Pat Murphy (Lab)	Joe Walsh (FF)
22nd	1981	Jim O'Keeffe (FG)	P. J. Sheehan (FG)	Flor Crowley (FF)
23rd	1982 (Feb)	Jim O'Keeffe (FG)	P. J. Sheehan (FG)	Joe Walsh (FF)
24th	1982 (Nov)	Jim O'Keeffe (FG)	P. J. Sheehan (FG)	Joe Walsh (FF)
25th	1987	Jim O'Keeffe (FG)	P. J. Sheehan (FG)	Joe Walsh (FF)
26th	1989	Jim O'Keeffe (FG)	P. J. Sheehan (FG)	Joe Walsh (FF)
27th	1992	Jim O'Keeffe (FG)	P. J. Sheehan (FG)	Joe Walsh (FF)
28th	1997	Jim O'Keeffe (FG)	P. J. Sheehan (FG)	Joe Walsh (FF)
29th	2002	Jim O'Keeffe (FG)	Denis O'Donovan (FF)	Joe Walsh (FF)
30th	2007	Jim O'Keeffe (FG)	P. J. Sheehan (FG)	Christy O'Sullivan (FF)
31st	2011	Jim Daly (FG)	Noel Harrington (FG)	Michael McCarthy (Lab)
32nd	2016	Jim Daly (FG)	Michael Collins (Ind.)	Margaret Murphy O'Mahony (FF)
33rd	2020	Holly Cairns (SD)	Michael Collins (Ind.)	Christopher O'Sullivan (FF)
34th	2024	Holly Cairns (SD)	Michael Collins (II)	Christopher O'Sullivan (FF)
