= Michael Calnan =

Irish politician (died 2025)

Senator
- In office 17 February 1993 – 17 September 1997
- Constituency: Agricultural Panel

Personal details
- Born: County Cork, Ireland
- Died: 21 October 2025 Cork, Ireland
- Party: Labour Party
- Children: 2
- Relatives: Michael McCarthy (cousin)
- Education: University College Cork

Michael Calnan (died 21 October 2025) was an Irish Labour Party politician from County Cork. He was a senator from 1993 to 1997.

A teacher and vice principal of the Maria Immaculata Secondary school in Dunmanway, he attended University College Cork where he obtained a B.A, H.dip Ed, and a master's degree. He was a long-serving member of Cork County Council for the Skibbereen electoral area. He was chairman of the council from 1988 to 1989 and 1992 to 1993, and stepped down at the 1999 local elections.

Calnan stood unsuccessfully as a candidate for Dáil Éireann in the Cork South-West constituency on three occasions, at the February 1982, 1992, and 1997 general elections. After his 1992 defeat, he stood in the 1993 elections to the 20th Seanad, winning a seat on the Agricultural Panel. He did not contest the 1997 Seanad elections.

His cousin is the former Labour TD for Cork South-West Michael McCarthy.

Calnan died on 21 October 2025.
