= Cork South-West =

Irish parliamentary constituency (1961–present)

- Dáil constituency
- Location of Cork South-West within Ireland
- Interactive map of constituency boundaries since the 2024 general election
- Major settlements: Bandon; Bantry; Castletownbere; Clonakilty; Dunmanway; Kinsale; Skibbereen

Current constituency
- Created: 1961
- Seats: 3
- TDs: Holly Cairns (SD); Michael Collins (II); Christopher O'Sullivan (FF)
- Local government area: County Cork
- EP constituency: South

Cork South-West is a parliamentary constituency represented in Dáil Éireann, the lower house of the Irish parliament or Oireachtas. The constituency elects three deputies (Teachtaí Dála, commonly known as TDs) on the system of proportional representation by means of the single transferable vote (PR-STV).

== History and boundaries ==
It is a largely rural constituency within County Cork, running from Dursey Island in the west to Ringabella in the east, with many medium-sized towns, including Bandon, Bantry, Castletownbere, Clonakilty, Kinsale and Skibbereen.

It was first used at the 1961 general election. The Electoral (Amendment) (Dáil Constituencies) Act 2017 defines the constituency as:

"The county of Cork, except the parts thereof which are comprised in the constituencies of Cork East, Cork North-Central, Cork North-West and Cork South-Central."

The Constituency Review Report 2023 of the Electoral Commission recommended that no change be made at the 2024 general election.

Changes to the Cork South-West constituency
Years	TDs	Boundaries	Notes
1961–1969	3	In County Cork, the district electoral divisions of Bengour, in the former Rural District of Bandon; Ahil, Bantry Rural, Bantry Urban, Douce, Durrus East, Durrus West, Glanlough, Glengarrif, Kealkill, Kil-caskan, Mealagh, Scart, Seefin, Sheepshead, Whiddy, in the former Rural District of Bantry; Adrigole, Bear, Goulagh, Curryglass, Kilcatherine, Killaconenagh, Kilna-managh, in the former Rural District of Castletown; Ardfield, Argideen, Cahermore, Castleventry, Clonakilty Rural, Coolcraheen, Derry, Kilkerranmore, Kilmoylerane, Kilnagross, Knocks, Rathbarry, Rosscarbery, Rossmore, in the former Rural District of Clonakilty; Aultagh, Ballingurteen, Ballymoney, Bealanagarry, Bealock, Carrigboy, Castletown, Coolmountain, Drinagh, Dunmanway North, Dunmanway South, Garrown, Kinneigh, Manch, Milane, Teerelton, in the former Rural District of Dunmanway; Bealanageary, Candroma, Cleanrath, Derryfineen, Gortnatubbrid, Greenville, Inchigeelagh, Kilnamartery, Macloneigh, Mashanaglass, Slievereagh, Ullanes, in the former Rural District of Macroom; Aghadown North, Aghadown South, Bredagh, Caheragh, Cape Clear, Carrigbaun, Castlehaven North, Castlehaven South, Cloghdonnell, Cloonkeen, Drinagh, Dromdaleague North, Dromdaleague South, Garranes, Gortnascreeny, Kilfaughnabeg, Killeenleagh, Knockskagh, Myross, Shreelane, Skibbereen Rural, Tullagh, Woodfort, in the former Rural District of Skibbereen; Ballybane, Ballydehob, Coolagh, Crookhaven, Dunbeacon, Dunmanus, Goleen, Kilcoe, Lowertown, Skull, Toormore, in the former Rural District of Skull; and the urban districts of Clonakilty, Macroom and Skibbereen.	Created from Cork West and Cork North.
1969–1977	3	In County Cork, the district electoral divisions of Ballinadee, Ballymodan, Ballymurphy, Bandon, Baurleigh, Bengour, Boulteen, Brinny, Cashel, Inishannon, Kilbrittain, Kilbrogan, Knockavilly, Knockroe, Murragh, Rathclarin, Teadies, Templemartin, in the former Rural District of Bandon; Bantry Rural, Bantry Urban, Durrus East, Durrus West, Glanlough, Glengarriff, Kealkill, Kilcaskan, Mealagh, Scart, Seefin, Sheepshead, Whiddy, in the former Rural District of Bantry; Adrigole, Bear, Curryglass, Killaconenagh, in the former Rural District of Castletown; Abbeymahon, Ardfield, Argideen, Butlerstown, Cahermore, Castleventry, Clonakilty Rural, Coolcraheen, Courtmacsherry, Derry, Kilkerranmore, Kilmaloda East, Kilmaloda West, Kilmoylerane, Kilnagross, Knocks, Rathbarry, Rosscarbery, Rossmore, Templeomalus, Timoleague, in the former Rural District of Clonakilty; Ballingurteen, Ballymoney, Castletown, Drinagh, Dunmanway North, Dunmanway South, Kinneigh, Manch, Milane, in the former Rural District of Dunmanway; Ballinspittle, Ballymackean, Coolmain, Kinsale Rural, Laherne, in the former Rural District of Kinsale; Aghadown North, Aghadown South, Bredagh, Caheragh, Cape Clear, Carrigbaun, Castlehaven North, Castlehaven South, Cloghdonnell, Cloonkeen, Drinagh, Dromdaleague North, Dromdaleague South, Garranes, Gortnascreeny, Kilfaughnabeg, Killeenleagh, Knockskagh, Myross, Shreelane, Skibbereen Rural, Tullagh, Woodfort, in the former Rural District of Skibbereen; Ballybane, Ballydehob, Coolagh, Crookhaven, Dunbeacon, Dunmanus, Goleen, Kilcoe, Lowertown, Skull, Toormore, in the former Rural District of Skull; and the urban districts of Clonakilty, Kinsale and Skibbereen.	Transfer of the urban district of Kinsale and DEDs in the former Rural District of Bandon from Cork Mid; transfer of the urban district of Macroom to Cork Mid; transfer of Coulagh, Kilcatherine, Kilnamanagh, in the former Rural District of Castletown to Kerry South.
1977–1981	3	In County Cork, the district electoral divisions of Ballinadee, Ballymodan, Ballymurphy, Bandon, Baurleigh, Bengour, Boulteen, Brinny, Cashel, Inishannon, Kilbrittain, Kilbrogan, Knockavilly, Knockroe, Murragh, Rathclarin, Teadies, Templemartin, in the former Rural District of Bandon; Bantry Rural, Bantry Urban, Durrus East, Durrus West, Glanlough, Glengarriff, Kealkill, Kilcaskan, Mealagh, Scart, Seefin, Sheepshead, Whiddy, in the former Rural District of Bantry; Adrigole, Curryglass, in the former Rural District of Castletown; Abbeymahon, Ardfield, Argideen, Butlerstown, Cahermore, Castleventry, Clonakilty Rural, Coolcraheen, Courtmacsherry, Derry, Kilkerranmore, Kilmaloda East, Kilmaloda West, Kilmoylerane, Kilnagross, Knocks, Rathbarry, Rosscarbery, Rossmore, Templeomalus, Timoleague, in the former Rural District of Clonakilty; Ballingurteen, Ballymoney, Castletown, Drinagh, Dunmanway North, Dunmanway South, Kinneigh, Manch, Milane, in the former Rural District of Dunmanway; Ballinspittle, Ballymackean, Coolmain, Kinsale Rural, Laherne, in the former Rural District of Kinsale; Aghadown North, Aghadown South, Bredagh, Caheragh, Cape Clear, Carrigbaun, Castlehaven North, Castlehaven South, Cloghdonnell, Cloonkeen, Drinagh, Dromdaleague North, Dromdaleague South, Garranes, Gortnascreeny, Kilfaughnabeg, Killeenleagh, Knockskagh, Myross, Shreelane, Skibbereen Rural, Tullagh, Woodfort, in the former Rural District of Skibbereen; Ballybane, Ballydehob, Coolagh, Crookhaven, Dunbeacon, Dunmanus, Goleen, Kilcoe, Lowertown, Skull, Toormore, in the former Rural District of Skull; and the urban districts of Clonakilty, Kinsale and Skibbereen.	Transfer of Bear, Killaconenagh, in the former Rural District of Castletown to Kerry South.
1981–1992	3	In County Cork, the district electoral divisions of Ballinadee, Ballymodan, Bandon, Baurleigh, Boulteen, Cashel, Inishannon, Kilbrittain, Kilbrogan, Knockroe, Rathclarin, in the former Rural District of Bandon; Bantry Rural, Bantry Urban, Durrus East, Durrus West, Glanlough, Glengarriff, Kealkill, Kilcaskan, Mealagh, Scart, Seefin, Sheepshead, Whiddy, in the former Rural District of Bantry; Adrigole, Bear, Coulagh, Curryglass, Kilcatherine, Kilaconenagh, Kilnamanagh in the former Rural District of Castletown; Abbeymahon, Ardfield, Argideen, Butlerstown, Cahermore, Castleventry, Clonakilty Rural, Coolcraheen, Courtmacsherry, Derry, Kilkerranmore, Kilmaloda East, Kilmaloda West, Kilmoylerane, Kilnagross, Knocks, Rathbarry, Rosscarbery, Rossmore, Templeomalus, Timoleague, in the former Rural District of Clonakilty; Ballingurteen, Ballymoney, Drinagh, Dunmanway North, Dunmanway South, Milane, in the former Rural District of Dunmanway; Ballinspittle, Ballymackean, Coolmain, Kinsale Rural, Laherne, Leighmoney, in the former Rural District of Kinsale; Aghadown North, Aghadown South, Bredagh, Caheragh, Cape Clear, Carrigbaun, Castlehaven North, Castlehaven South, Cloghdonnell, Cloonkeen, Drinagh, Dromdaleague North, Dromdaleague South, Garranes, Gortnascreeny, Kilfaughnabeg, Killeenleagh, Knockskagh, Myross, Shreelane, Skibbereen Rural, Tullagh, Woodfort, in the former Rural District of Skibbereen; Ballybane, Ballydehob, Coolagh, Crook-haven, Dunbeacon, Dunmanus, Goleen, Kilcoe, Lowertown, Skull, Toormore, in the former Rural District of Skull; and the urban districts of Clonakilty, Kinsale and Skibbereen.	Transfer of Bear, Coulagh, Kilcatherine, Killaconenagh, Kilnamanagh, in the former Rural District of Castletown, from Kerry South.
1992–1997	3	In County Cork, the district electoral divisions of Ballinadee, Ballymodan, Bandon, Baurleigh, Boulteen, Cashel, Inishannon, Kilbrittain, Kilbrogan, Knockroe, Rathclarin, in the former Rural District of Bandon; Bantry Rural, Bantry Urban, Durrus East, Durrus West, Glanlough, Glengarriff, Kealkill, Kilcaskan, Mealagh, Scart, Seefin, Sheepshead, Whiddy, in the former Rural District of Bantry; Adrigole, Bear, Coulagh, Curryglass, Kilcatherine, Killaconenagh, Kilnamanagh in the former Rural District of Castletown; Abbeymahon, Ardfield, Argideen, Butlerstown, Cahermore, Castleventry, Clonakilty Rural, Coolcraheen, Courtmacsherry, Derry, Kilkerranmore, Kilmaloda East, Kilmaloda West, Kilmoylerane, Kilnagross, Knocks, Rathbarry, Rosscarbery, Rossmore, Templeomalus, Timoleague, in the former Rural District of Clonakilty; Ballingurteen, Ballymoney, Drinagh, Dunmanway North, Dunmanway South, Milane, in the former Rural District of Dunmanway; Ballinspittle, Ballymackean, Ballymartle, Coolmain, Kinsale Rural, Laherne, Leighmoney, Templemichael, in the former Rural District of Kinsale; Aghadown North, Aghadown South, Bredagh, Caheragh, Cape Clear, Carrigbaun, Castlehaven North, Castlehaven South, Cloghdonnell, Cloonkeen, Drinagh, Dromdaleague North, Dromdaleague South, Garranes, Gortnascreeny, Kilfaughnabeg, Killeenleagh, Knockskagh, Myross, Shreelane, Skibbereen Rural, Tullagh, Woodfort, in the former Rural District of Skibbereen; Ballybane, Ballydehob, Coolagh, Crookhaven, Dunbeacon, Dunmanus, Goleen, Kilcoe, Lowertown, Skull, Toormore, in the former Rural District of Skull; and the urban districts of Clonakilty, Kinsale and Skibbereen.	District electoral divisions of Ballymartle and Templemichael in the former Rural District of Kinsale transferred from Cork South-Central.
1997–2007	3	In County Cork, the electoral divisions of Ballinadee, Ballymodan, Bandon, Baurleigh, Boulteen, Cashel, Inishannon, Kilbrittain, Kilbrogan, Knockroe, Rathclarin, in the former Rural District of Bandon; Ahil, Bantry Rural, Bantry Urban, Douce, Durrus East, Durrus West, Glanlough, Glengarriff, Kealkill, Kilcaskan, Mealagh, Scart, Seefin, Sheepshead, Whiddy, in the former Rural District of Bantry; Adrigole, Bear, Coulagh, Curryglass, Kilcatherine, Killaconenagh, Kilnamanagh in the former Rural District of Castletown; Abbeymahon, Ardfield, Argideen, Butlerstown, Cahermore, Castleventry, Clonakilty Rural, Coolcraheen, Courtmacsherry, Derry, Kilkerranmore, Kilmaloda East, Kilmaloda West, Kilmoylerane, Kilnagross, Knocks, Rathbarry, Rosscarbery, Rossmore, Templeomalus, Timoleague, in the former Rural District of Clonakilty; Ballingurteen, Ballymoney, Drinagh, Dunmanway North, Dunmanway South, Milane, in the former Rural District of Dunmanway; Ballinspittle, Ballymackean, Ballymartle, Coolmain, Kinsale Rural, Laherne, Leighmoney, Templemichael, in the former Rural District of Kinsale; Aghadown North, Aghadown South, Bredagh, Caheragh, Cape Clear, Carrigbaun, Castlehaven North, Castlehaven South, Cloghdonnell, Cloonkeen, Drinagh, Dromdaleague North, Dromdaleague South, Garranes, Gortnascreeny, Kilfaughnabeg, Killeenleagh, Knockskagh, Myross, Shreelane, Skibbereen Rural, Tullagh, Woodfort, in the former Rural District of Skibbereen; Ballybane, Ballydehob, Coolagh, Crookhaven, Dunbeacon, Dunmanus, Goleen, Kilcoe, Lowertown, Skull, Toormore, in the former Rural District of Skull; and the urban districts of Clonakilty, Kinsale and Skibbereen.	Electoral divisions of Ahil and Douce in the former Rural District of Bantry transferred from Cork North-West.
2007–	3	County Cork, except the parts in the constituencies of Cork East, Cork North-Central, Cork North-West and Cork South-Central.	Electoral divisions of Dunderrow in the former Rural District of Cork and Ballyfeard, Ballyfoyle, Cullen, Farranbrien, Kilmonoge, Kinure and Nohaval in the former Rural District of Kinsale transferred from Cork South-Central.

== TDs ==
Teachtaí Dála (TDs) for Cork South-West 1961–
Key to parties: FF = Fianna Fáil; FG = Fine Gael; Lab = Labour; II = Independent Ireland; SD = Social Democrats; Ind. = Independent
Dáil	Election	Deputy (Party)	Deputy (Party)	Deputy (Party)
17th	1961	Seán Collins (FG)	Michael Pat Murphy (Lab)	Edward Cotter (FF)
18th	1965	Seán Collins (FG)	Michael Pat Murphy (Lab)	Edward Cotter (FF)
19th	1969	John O'Sullivan (FG)	Michael Pat Murphy (Lab)	Flor Crowley (FF)
20th	1973	John O'Sullivan (FG)	Michael Pat Murphy (Lab)	Flor Crowley (FF)
21st	1977	Jim O'Keeffe (FG)	Michael Pat Murphy (Lab)	Joe Walsh (FF)
22nd	1981	Jim O'Keeffe (FG)	P. J. Sheehan (FG)	Flor Crowley (FF)
23rd	1982 (Feb)	Jim O'Keeffe (FG)	P. J. Sheehan (FG)	Joe Walsh (FF)
24th	1982 (Nov)	Jim O'Keeffe (FG)	P. J. Sheehan (FG)	Joe Walsh (FF)
25th	1987	Jim O'Keeffe (FG)	P. J. Sheehan (FG)	Joe Walsh (FF)
26th	1989	Jim O'Keeffe (FG)	P. J. Sheehan (FG)	Joe Walsh (FF)
27th	1992	Jim O'Keeffe (FG)	P. J. Sheehan (FG)	Joe Walsh (FF)
28th	1997	Jim O'Keeffe (FG)	P. J. Sheehan (FG)	Joe Walsh (FF)
29th	2002	Jim O'Keeffe (FG)	Denis O'Donovan (FF)	Joe Walsh (FF)
30th	2007	Jim O'Keeffe (FG)	P. J. Sheehan (FG)	Christy O'Sullivan (FF)
31st	2011	Jim Daly (FG)	Noel Harrington (FG)	Michael McCarthy (Lab)
32nd	2016	Jim Daly (FG)	Michael Collins (Ind.)	Margaret Murphy O'Mahony (FF)
33rd	2020	Holly Cairns (SD)	Michael Collins (Ind.)	Christopher O'Sullivan (FF)
34th	2024	Holly Cairns (SD)	Michael Collins (II)	Christopher O'Sullivan (FF)

Note: The columns in this table are used only for presentational purposes, and no significance should be attached to the order of columns. For details of the order in which seats were won at each election, see the detailed results of that election.

== Elections ==
*: Outgoing TD

=== 2024 general election ===
2024 general election: Cork South-West
Party	Candidate	FPv%	Count										
Party	Candidate	FPv%	1	2	3	4	5	6	7	8	9	10	11
Independent Ireland	Michael Collins	23.3	11,002	11,113	11,125	11,140	11,185	11,605	11,721	12,295			
Social Democrats	Holly Cairns	19.9	9,421	9,438	9,601	9,782	10,039	10,085	10,214	11,170	11,720	11,962	
Fianna Fáil	Christopher O'Sullivan	19.3	9,115	9,118	9,147	9,159	9,206	9,261	9,305	9,396	10,090	10,135	11,959
Fine Gael	Noel O'Donovan	12.9	6,122	6,127	6,161	6,162	6,207	6,248	6,266	6,307	6,510	6,533	9,856
Fine Gael	Tim Lombard	10.6	5,003	5,010	5,035	5,036	5,078	5,135	5,146	5,185	5,836	5,853	
Independent	Alan Coleman	4.6	2,191	2,213	2,219	2,227	2,248	2,344	2,361	2,537			
Sinn Féin	Claire O'Callaghan	3.1	1,448	1,458	1,462	1,523	1,552	1,586	2,152				
Sinn Féin	Donnchadh Ó Seaghdha	1.8	835	845	847	875	891	925					
Aontú	Mairead Ruane	1.5	707	791	801	810	821						
Labour	Evie Nevin	0.9	436	443	494	533							
PBP–Solidarity	Zoe Laplaud (Note: Laplaud is a member of People Before Profit.)	0.7	349	357	369								
Green	Mary Ryder	0.7	349	352									
The Irish People	Deborah O'Driscoll	0.6	287										
Independent	John O'Leary	0.1	29										
Electorate: 74,364 Valid: 47,294 Spoilt: 215 Quota: 11,824 Turnout: 47,509 (63.9%)

=== 2020 general election ===
2020 general election: Cork South-West
Party	Candidate	FPv%	Count							
Party	Candidate	FPv%	1	2	3	4	5	6	7	8
Independent	Michael Collins	26.4	11,712							
Fianna Fáil	Christopher O'Sullivan	14.1	6,262	6,400	6,503	6,602	6,960	7,228	10,273	11,262
Fine Gael	Tim Lombard	13.2	5,865	5,917	5,982	6,170	6,669	8,557	9,133	9,526
Sinn Féin	Paul Hayes	10.8	4,777	4,881	5,075	5,229	5,462	5,542	5,832	
Social Democrats	Holly Cairns	10.6	4,696	4,808	5,008	5,994	6,280	6,593	7,055	10,078
Fianna Fáil	Margaret Murphy O'Mahony	9.2	4,077	4,163	4,274	4,352	4,761	4,863		
Fine Gael	Karen Coakley	5.7	2,526	2,577	2,595	2,698	2,747			
Independent	Alan Coleman	4.1	1,801	1,843	1,950	2,025				
Green	Bernadette Connolly	3.7	1,647	1,663	1,765					
Aontú	Mairéad Ruane	1.1	515	531						
Solidarity–PBP	Kevin O'Connor (Note: O'Connor was a member of People Before Profit.)	1.0	427	435						
Independent	Sean O'Leary	0.1	33	35						
Electorate: 69,127 Valid: 44,338 Spoilt: 288 Quota: 11,085 Turnout: 44,626 (64.6%)

=== 2016 general election ===
2016 general election: Cork South-West
Party	Candidate	FPv%	Count				
Party	Candidate	FPv%	1	2	3	4	5
Fianna Fáil	Margaret Murphy O'Mahony	19.6	8,482	8,845	9,228	10,020	11,962
Fine Gael	Jim Daly	17.0	7,370	7,633	8,523	8,774	9,799
Independent	Michael Collins	15.6	6,765	7,347	7,793	9,258	11,063
Fine Gael	Noel Harrington	14.9	6,433	6,574	7,377	7,544	8,208
Independent	Alan Coleman	11.5	4,955	5,272	5,634	6,405	
Sinn Féin	Rachel McCarthy	8.5	3,656	3,993	4,260		
Labour	Michael McCarthy	7.0	3,035	3,397			
Green	Johnny O'Mahony	1.7	752				
Independent	Gillian Powell	1.6	701				
Catholic Democrats	Theresa Heaney	1.6	686				
Independent	Fiona O'Leary	1.0	423				
Electorate: 63,583 Valid: 43,258 Spoilt: 331 Quota: 10,815 Turnout: 43,589 (68.6%)

=== 2011 general election ===
2011 general election: Cork South-West
Party	Candidate	FPv%	Count					
Party	Candidate	FPv%	1	2	3	4	5	6
Fine Gael	Jim Daly	19.4	8,878	9,255	9,696	10,508	13,242	
Fine Gael	Noel Harrington	15.1	6,898	7,212	7,479	7,668	9,568	11,104
Labour	Michael McCarthy	14.3	6,533	7,257	8,709	9,212	10,539	10,754
Fine Gael	Kevin Murphy	14.0	6,386	6,665	6,917	7,212		
Fianna Fáil	Denis O'Donovan	13.1	5,984	6,208	6,481	9,453	10,079	10,155
Fianna Fáil	Christy O'Sullivan	10.5	4,803	4,958	5,215			
Sinn Féin	Paul Hayes	7.3	3,346	3,743				
Independent	John Kearney	1.7	772					
Green	Kevin McCaughey	1.7	765					
New Vision	Dave McInerney (Note: New Vision was an electoral alliance of independent non-party candidates and did not appear on the ballot.)	1.1	493					
Independent	Edmund Butler	0.7	330					
New Vision	Paul Doonan	0.5	239					
Independent	Michael O'Sullivan	0.5	231					
Electorate: 62,174 Valid: 45,658 Spoilt: 390 (0.9%) Quota: 11,415 Turnout: 46,048 (74.1%)

=== 2007 general election ===
2007 general election: Cork South-West
Party	Candidate	FPv%	Count			
Party	Candidate	FPv%	1	2	3	4
Fianna Fáil	Christy O'Sullivan	24.3	10,333			
Fianna Fáil	Denis O'Donovan	18.3	7,760	8,008	8,417	9,420
Fine Gael	P. J. Sheehan	18.2	7,739	7,976	8,387	10,126
Fine Gael	Jim O'Keeffe	17.8	7,560	7,813	8,471	10,667
Labour	Michael McCarthy	9.6	4,095	4,471	5,912	
Green	Quentin Gargan	6.7	2,860	3,293		
Sinn Féin	Cionnaith Ó Súilleabháin	5.1	2,150			
Electorate: 61,577 Valid: 42,497 Spoilt: 410 (0.9%) Quota: 10,625 Turnout: 42,907 (69.7%)

=== 2002 general election ===
2002 general election: Cork South-West
Party	Candidate	FPv%	Count						
Party	Candidate	FPv%	1	2	3	4	5	6	7
Fianna Fáil	Denis O'Donovan	20.4	7,695	7,774	7,862	8,277	8,863	10,179	
Fianna Fáil	Joe Walsh	19.1	7,187	7,271	7,395	7,706	8,119	8,997	9,387
Fine Gael	Jim O'Keeffe	16.9	6,358	6,476	6,622	6,835	7,724	8,496	8,591
Fine Gael	P. J. Sheehan	15.5	5,831	5,864	5,932	6,156	6,987	8,287	8,556
Independent	Christy O'Sullivan	9.6	3,609	3,684	3,849	4,303	5,144		
Labour	Michael McCarthy	9.1	3,442	3,505	3,636	4,030			
Sinn Féin	Cionnaith Ó Súilleabháin	3.5	1,308	1,329	1,372				
Sinn Féin	Anne O'Leary	2.4	899	908	945				
Independent	Theresa Heaney	1.9	748	864					
Independent	Edmund Butler	1.6	621						
Electorate: 54,274 Valid: 37,698 Spoilt: 434 (1.1%) Quota: 9,425 Turnout: 38,132 (70.3%)

=== 1997 general election ===
1997 general election: Cork South-West
Party	Candidate	FPv%	Count		
Party	Candidate	FPv%	1	2	3
Fine Gael	P. J. Sheehan	22.9	8,008	8,233	9,545
Fianna Fáil	Joe Walsh	21.7	7,586	7,783	8,516
Fine Gael	Jim O'Keeffe	21.3	7,454	7,802	9,128
Fianna Fáil	Denis O'Donovan	17.4	6,081	6,285	7,082
Labour	Michael Calnan	6.8	2,361	2,716	
National Party	Theresa Heaney	5.1	1,792	2,036	
Green	Paula Giles	3.5	1,221		
Independent	Áine Ní Chonaill	0.8	293		
Independent	Sean Ahern	0.6	199		
Electorate: 49,382 Valid: 34,995 Spoilt: 319 (0.9%) Quota: 8,749 Turnout: 35,314 (71.5%)

=== 1992 general election ===
1992 general election: Cork South-West
Party	Candidate	FPv%	Count							
Party	Candidate	FPv%	1	2	3	4	5	6	7	8
Fianna Fáil	Joe Walsh	28.2	9,376							
Fine Gael	P. J. Sheehan	21.4	7,113	7,243	7,262	7,286	7,322	7,439	7,760	9,222
Fine Gael	Jim O'Keeffe	19.1	6,345	6,491	6,531	6,564	6,589	6,638	6,957	8,388
Fianna Fáil	Denis O'Donovan	12.8	4,268	4,923	4,941	4,970	5,086	5,192	5,361	5,975
Labour	Michael Calnan	11.3	3,757	3,807	3,821	3,828	3,881	3,917	4,508	
Green	Mary O'Donnell	4.3	1,424	1,452	1,494	1,525	1,581	1,646		
Independent	Timothy O'Donovan	1.1	379	409	415	427	456			
Sinn Féin	Ann O'Leary	1.0	330	336	338	344				
Independent	Kathleen Dwyer	0.5	158	160	165					
Independent	Andrew Dillon	0.5	149	153						
Electorate: 45,769 Valid: 33,299 Spoilt: 623 (1.8%) Quota: 8,325 Turnout: 33,922 (74.1%)

=== 1989 general election ===
1989 general election: Cork South-West
Party	Candidate	FPv%	Count	
Party	Candidate	FPv%	1	2
Fine Gael	P. J. Sheehan	26.3	8,525	
Fianna Fáil	Joe Walsh	25.7	8,319	
Fine Gael	Jim O'Keeffe	24.3	7,861	8,223
Fianna Fáil	Denis O'Donovan	18.7	6,042	6,084
Progressive Democrats	Neilus Barry	3.9	1,259	1,275
Independent	Stephen O'Neill	1.0	309	312
Independent	William Fitzsimon	0.3	88	89
Electorate: 43,548 Valid: 32,403 Quota: 8,101 Turnout: 74.4%

=== 1987 general election ===
1987 general election: Cork South-West
Party	Candidate	FPv%	Count			
Party	Candidate	FPv%	1	2	3	4
Fianna Fáil	Joe Walsh	28.4	9,488			
Fine Gael	Jim O'Keeffe	23.4	7,814	9,414		
Fine Gael	P. J. Sheehan	20.2	6,752	7,794	7,972	8,897
Fianna Fáil	Denis O'Donovan	16.9	5,644	6,352	7,311	7,449
Progressive Democrats	Ray O'Neill	10.7	3,570			
Ind. Unionist	Stan Gebler Davies	0.4	134			
Electorate: 42,956 Valid: 33,402 Quota: 8,351 Turnout: 77.7%

=== November 1982 general election ===
November 1982 general election: Cork South-West
Party	Candidate	FPv%	Count			
Party	Candidate	FPv%	1	2	3	4
Fine Gael	Jim O'Keeffe	26.4	8,704			
Fianna Fáil	Joe Walsh	25.5	8,432			
Fine Gael	P. J. Sheehan	23.5	7,756	8,149	8,184	8,320
Fianna Fáil	Flor Crowley	16.2	5,340	5,368	5,488	5,540
Independent	John O'Sullivan	7.5	2,468	2,490	2,509	2,622
Independent	Elizabeth Ryder	1.0	319	325	328	
Electorate: 41,235 Valid: 33,019 Quota: 8,255 Turnout: 80.1%

=== February 1982 general election ===
February 1982 general election: Cork South-West
Party	Candidate	FPv%	Count			
Party	Candidate	FPv%	1	2	3	4
Fianna Fáil	Joe Walsh	21.8	7,145	7,323	7,561	8,748
Fine Gael	Jim O'Keeffe	20.9	6,868	7,808	8,561	
Fine Gael	P. J. Sheehan	20.8	6,834	7,626	8,451	
Fianna Fáil	Flor Crowley	15.1	4,940	5,024	5,289	6,660
Fianna Fáil	D. F. O'Sullivan	8.1	2,640	2,677	2,831	
Labour	Michael Calnan	6.7	2,215	2,346		
Fine Gael	John McCarthy	6.6	2,179			
Electorate: 40,969 Valid: 32,821 Spoilt: 208 (0.6%) Quota: 8,206 Turnout: 33,029 (80.6%)

=== 1981 general election ===
1981 general election: Cork South-West
Party	Candidate	FPv%	Count					
Party	Candidate	FPv%	1	2	3	4	5	6
Fine Gael	Jim O'Keeffe	24.5	8,266	8,409	8,490			
Fianna Fáil	Flor Crowley	18.0	6,085	6,403	6,708	7,569	7,801	8,510
Fianna Fáil	Joe Walsh	15.8	5,317	5,463	6,030	6,537	6,794	7,246
Fine Gael	P. J. Sheehan	13.1	4,417	4,503	4,715	4,761	6,441	8,410
Labour	Philip Murphy	9.6	3,244	3,371	3,429	3,506	3,934	
Fine Gael	John McCarthy	7.7	2,597	2,650	2,657	2,729		
Fianna Fáil	Peter Callanan	4.4	1,485	1,547	1,629			
Fianna Fáil	Eithne O'Mahony	3.7	1,256	1,334				
Independent	Seán Kelleher	3.3	1,097					
Electorate: 40,969 Valid: 33,764 Quota: 8,442 Turnout: 82.4%

=== 1977 general election ===
1977 general election: Cork South-West
Party	Candidate	FPv%	Count				
Party	Candidate	FPv%	1	2	3	4	5
Fianna Fáil	Joe Walsh	20.4	6,789	6,892	7,932	8,831	
Labour	Michael Pat Murphy	20.3	6,768	7,455	7,942	8,973	
Fianna Fáil	Flor Crowley	17.6	5,863	5,952	7,561	7,761	7,880
Fine Gael	Jim O'Keeffe	12.7	4,229	5,041	5,269	7,880	8,404
Fine Gael	John O'Sullivan	11.4	3,786	4,350	4,410		
Fianna Fáil	Vivian Callaghan	10.2	3,387	3,537			
Fine Gael	P. J. Sheehan	7.4	2,473				
Electorate: 40,689 Valid: 33,295 Quota: 8,324 Turnout: 81.8%

=== 1973 general election ===
1973 general election: Cork South-West
Party	Candidate	FPv%	Count		
Party	Candidate	FPv%	1	2	3
Fianna Fáil	Flor Crowley	23.8	7,251	7,362	7,499
Labour	Michael Pat Murphy	21.7	6,597	7,846	
Fine Gael	John O'Sullivan	21.1	6,420	8,754	
Fianna Fáil	Terence Sullivan	19.7	5,989	6,374	6,564
Fine Gael	P. J. Sheehan	13.8	4,204		
Electorate: 38,285 Valid: 30,461 Quota: 7,616 Turnout: 79.6%

=== 1969 general election ===
1969 general election: Cork South-West
Party	Candidate	FPv%	Count			
Party	Candidate	FPv%	1	2	3	4
Fianna Fáil	Flor Crowley	22.9	6,941	7,082	10,204	
Labour	Michael Pat Murphy	21.9	6,647	7,042	7,614	
Fine Gael	John O'Sullivan	15.3	4,654	6,373	6,582	6,953
Fine Gael	P. J. Sheehan	15.0	4,562	5,346	5,617	5,969
Fianna Fáil	John Cahalane	14.3	4,352	4,439		
Fine Gael	Seán Collins	10.6	3,216			
Electorate: 38,219 Valid: 30,372 Quota: 7,594 Turnout: 79.5%

=== 1965 general election ===
1965 general election: Cork South-West
Party	Candidate	FPv%	Count		
Party	Candidate	FPv%	1	2	3
Labour	Michael Pat Murphy	28.9	7,971		
Fianna Fáil	Edward Cotter	26.6	7,323		
Fine Gael	Seán Collins	18.8	5,180	5,647	6,162
Fine Gael	John O'Sullivan	14.3	3,942	4,281	5,059
Fianna Fáil	Michael Finn	11.4	3,144	3,418	
Electorate: 35,075 Valid: 27,560 Quota: 6,891 Turnout: 78.6%

=== 1961 general election ===
1961 general election: Cork South-West
Party	Candidate	FPv%	Count			
Party	Candidate	FPv%	1	2	3	4
Labour	Michael Pat Murphy	25.4	7,381			
Fianna Fáil	Edward Cotter	19.3	5,591	7,847		
Fine Gael	Seán Collins	17.6	5,117	5,296	5,363	8,003
Independent	Florence Wycherley	13.3	3,873	4,250	4,688	5,620
Fine Gael	John L. O'Sullivan	12.8	3,718	4,078	4,158	
Fianna Fáil	Michael Finn	11.6	3,367			
Electorate: 36,332 Valid: 29,047 Quota: 7,262 Turnout: 80.0%

== See also ==
- Elections in the Republic of Ireland
- Politics of the Republic of Ireland
- List of Dáil by-elections
- List of political parties in the Republic of Ireland
