= P. J. Sheehan =

Irish politician (1933–2020)

Teachta Dála
- In office May 2007 – February 2011
- In office June 1981 – May 2002
- Constituency: Cork South-West

Personal details
- Born: 1 March 1933 Goleen, County Cork, Ireland
- Died: 10 August 2020 (aged 87) Cork, Ireland
- Party: Fine Gael
- Spouse: Frances Collins (m. 1961; died 2020)
- Children: 4

Patrick Joseph Sheehan (1 March 1933 – 10 August 2020) was an Irish Fine Gael politician who served as a Teachta Dála (TD) for the Cork South-West constituency from 1981 to 2002 and 2007 to 2011.

== Career ==
Before entering politics, Sheehan worked as an auctioneer, merchant, and farmer, and used his experiences in these fields to establish his political base. He was involved in politics for more than 50 years. In 1967, he was elected to Cork County Council for the first time. He was a prominent campaigner for rural rights. He once clashed with Taoiseach Charles Haughey in Dáil Éireann.

Sheehan was first elected to the Dáil at the 1981 general election, and retained his Cork South-West seat until losing it at the 2002 general election. He regained his seat at the 2007 general election at the age of 74. He served as Fine Gael's deputy spokesperson on Agriculture with special responsibility for Forestry until 2010. He and fellow Fine Gael TD Jim O'Keeffe were noted for their cooperation within their constituency that successfully foiled Fianna Fáil's efforts to garner another seat in west Cork. Sheehan's support base was concentrated in Goleen, which is approximately 400 km away from the Dáil. Because of this, he would quip that he was the TD "furthest from the Dáil and nearest to the White House".

Sheehan retired from politics at the 2011 general election.

On 20 September 2010, Sheehan resigned his position as Fine Gael's deputy spokesperson on Agriculture and apologised for being under the influence of alcohol and threatening a Garda officer after she prevented him from driving while leaving Leinster House in July 2010. He was reported to have threatened her career if she disrupted him. His party leader, Enda Kenny, told a sergeant to "ignore what Sheehan had said".

== Personal life ==
Sheehan was married to Frances Collins. Together they had four children.

He died on 10 August 2020, aged 87, one week after his wife died.

Dáil	Election	Deputy (Party)	Deputy (Party)	Deputy (Party)
17th	1961	Seán Collins (FG)	Michael Pat Murphy (Lab)	Edward Cotter (FF)
18th	1965	Seán Collins (FG)	Michael Pat Murphy (Lab)	Edward Cotter (FF)
19th	1969	John O'Sullivan (FG)	Michael Pat Murphy (Lab)	Flor Crowley (FF)
20th	1973	John O'Sullivan (FG)	Michael Pat Murphy (Lab)	Flor Crowley (FF)
21st	1977	Jim O'Keeffe (FG)	Michael Pat Murphy (Lab)	Joe Walsh (FF)
22nd	1981	Jim O'Keeffe (FG)	P. J. Sheehan (FG)	Flor Crowley (FF)
23rd	1982 (Feb)	Jim O'Keeffe (FG)	P. J. Sheehan (FG)	Joe Walsh (FF)
24th	1982 (Nov)	Jim O'Keeffe (FG)	P. J. Sheehan (FG)	Joe Walsh (FF)
25th	1987	Jim O'Keeffe (FG)	P. J. Sheehan (FG)	Joe Walsh (FF)
26th	1989	Jim O'Keeffe (FG)	P. J. Sheehan (FG)	Joe Walsh (FF)
27th	1992	Jim O'Keeffe (FG)	P. J. Sheehan (FG)	Joe Walsh (FF)
28th	1997	Jim O'Keeffe (FG)	P. J. Sheehan (FG)	Joe Walsh (FF)
29th	2002	Jim O'Keeffe (FG)	Denis O'Donovan (FF)	Joe Walsh (FF)
30th	2007	Jim O'Keeffe (FG)	P. J. Sheehan (FG)	Christy O'Sullivan (FF)
31st	2011	Jim Daly (FG)	Noel Harrington (FG)	Michael McCarthy (Lab)
32nd	2016	Jim Daly (FG)	Michael Collins (Ind.)	Margaret Murphy O'Mahony (FF)
33rd	2020	Holly Cairns (SD)	Michael Collins (Ind.)	Christopher O'Sullivan (FF)
34th	2024	Holly Cairns (SD)	Michael Collins (II)	Christopher O'Sullivan (FF)
