= John O'Sullivan (Cork politician) =

Irish politician (1901–1990)

Teachta Dála
- In office June 1969 – June 1977
- Constituency: Cork South-West

Senator
- In office 22 July 1954 – 14 December 1961
- Constituency: Administrative Panel

Personal details
- Born: 8 June 1901 County Cork, Ireland
- Died: 28 February 1990 (aged 88) County Cork, Ireland
- Party: Fine Gael
- Spouse: Bridie O'Sullivan (m. 1940)
- Children: 6

John L. O'Sullivan (8 June 1901 – 28 February 1990) was an Irish Fine Gael politician and farmer from West Cork who was a Senator for 7 years and later a Teachta Dála (TD) for 8 years. He was a member of the IRA during the war of independence.

O'Sullivan was an unsuccessful Fine Gael candidate for Dáil Éireann at the 1937 general election in the Cork West constituency, was defeated again at four further general elections before finally being elected to the 19th Dáil nearly thirty years later.

After his defeat in Cork West at the 1954 general election, O'Sullivan won a seat in the 1954 Administrative Panel elections to the 8th Seanad, and was re-elected in 1957 to the 9th Seanad. He did not contest the 1957 general election.

He was first returned to the Dáil at the age of 68 at the 1969 general election, as the only Fine Gael TD in the 19th Dáil for the 3-seat Cork South-West constituency. He was re-elected at the 1973 general election, but lost his seat at the 1977 general election.

Party political offices
| New post | Chair of the Fine Gael parliamentary party 1970–1977 | Succeeded by Kieran Crotty |

| Dáil | Election | Deputy (Party) | Deputy (Party) | Deputy (Party) |
|---|---|---|---|---|
| 17th | 1961 | Seán Collins (FG) | Michael Pat Murphy (Lab) | Edward Cotter (FF) |
| 18th | 1965 | Seán Collins (FG) | Michael Pat Murphy (Lab) | Edward Cotter (FF) |
| 19th | 1969 | John O'Sullivan (FG) | Michael Pat Murphy (Lab) | Flor Crowley (FF) |
| 20th | 1973 | John O'Sullivan (FG) | Michael Pat Murphy (Lab) | Flor Crowley (FF) |
| 21st | 1977 | Jim O'Keeffe (FG) | Michael Pat Murphy (Lab) | Joe Walsh (FF) |
| 22nd | 1981 | Jim O'Keeffe (FG) | P. J. Sheehan (FG) | Flor Crowley (FF) |
| 23rd | 1982 (Feb) | Jim O'Keeffe (FG) | P. J. Sheehan (FG) | Joe Walsh (FF) |
| 24th | 1982 (Nov) | Jim O'Keeffe (FG) | P. J. Sheehan (FG) | Joe Walsh (FF) |
| 25th | 1987 | Jim O'Keeffe (FG) | P. J. Sheehan (FG) | Joe Walsh (FF) |
| 26th | 1989 | Jim O'Keeffe (FG) | P. J. Sheehan (FG) | Joe Walsh (FF) |
| 27th | 1992 | Jim O'Keeffe (FG) | P. J. Sheehan (FG) | Joe Walsh (FF) |
| 28th | 1997 | Jim O'Keeffe (FG) | P. J. Sheehan (FG) | Joe Walsh (FF) |
| 29th | 2002 | Jim O'Keeffe (FG) | Denis O'Donovan (FF) | Joe Walsh (FF) |
| 30th | 2007 | Jim O'Keeffe (FG) | P. J. Sheehan (FG) | Christy O'Sullivan (FF) |
| 31st | 2011 | Jim Daly (FG) | Noel Harrington (FG) | Michael McCarthy (Lab) |
| 32nd | 2016 | Jim Daly (FG) | Michael Collins (Ind.) | Margaret Murphy O'Mahony (FF) |
| 33rd | 2020 | Holly Cairns (SD) | Michael Collins (Ind.) | Christopher O'Sullivan (FF) |
| 34th | 2024 | Holly Cairns (SD) | Michael Collins (II) | Christopher O'Sullivan (FF) |
