= Stan Gebler Davies =

Irish journalist (1943–1994)

Stanley Gebler Davies (16 July 1943 – 23 June 1994) was an Irish journalist with the Irish Independent as well as with various British magazines (including Punch, The Evening Standard, The Daily Telegraph and The Spectator).

Of part-Polish and part-Jewish ancestry, Davies born in Dublin, and was known for his eccentric views and for his exceptional alcohol intake. In the late 1970s the Evening Standard printed his pithy, 50-word apercus among their longer items; he was also permitted to call Hans Keller a 'twat' on the letters pages of The Spectator. As well as his writing (which included a book on James Joyce), he engaged in political activity, having been a Unionist candidate for the constituency of Cork South-West, coming last with 134 votes.

Davies had no time for any of the versions of the Irish Republican Army, least of all the Provisional IRA. He railed against them in his occasional Evening Standard column. He also wrote about the extent to which journalists from major London newspapers were often biased in favour of both Sinn Fein and the IRA. He went as far as suggesting that the Republic of Ireland would be better off reintegrating with the United Kingdom.

He died of lung cancer in Dalkey, Ireland, after a long illness.
