= Margaret Murphy O'Mahony =

Irish politician (born 1969)

Senator Margaret Murphy O'Mahony
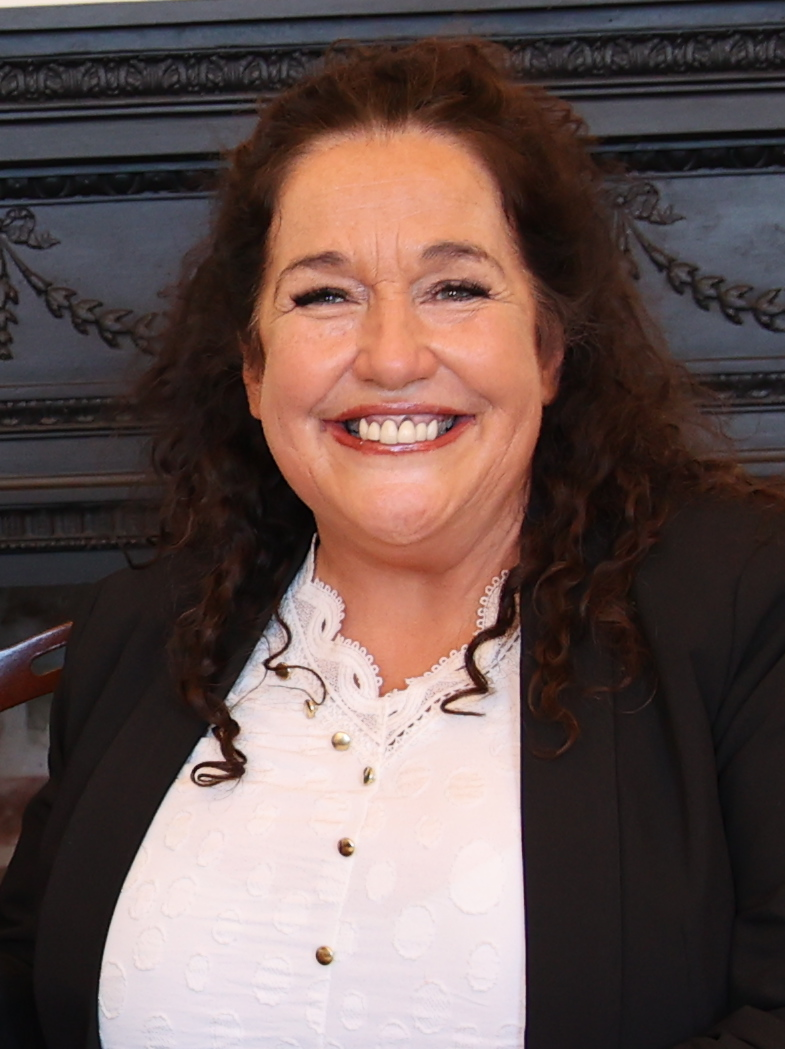
- Murphy O'Mahony in 2025

Senator
- Incumbent
- Assumed office January 2025
- Constituency: Labour Panel

Teachta Dála
- In office February 2016 – February 2020
- Constituency: Cork South-West

Personal details
- Born: Margaret Murphy; 3 April 1969 (age 57) Bandon, County Cork, Ireland
- Party: Fianna Fáil
- Spouse: Paddy O'Mahony
- Children: 2
- Education: Cork Institute of Technology

Margaret Murphy O'Mahony (born 3 April 1969) is an Irish Fianna Fáil politician who has served as a senator for the Labour Panel since January 2025. She previously served as a Teachta Dála (TD) for the Cork South-West constituency from 2016 to 2020.

She had been a member of Cork County Council for the Bandon-Kinsale local electoral area from 2014 to 2016. She served on the now abolished Bandon Town Council from 2004 to 2014.

She is anti-abortion and did not support the repeal of the eighth amendment. She was the Fianna Fáil spokesperson on Disability from 2016 to 2020.

She lost her Dáil seat at the 2020 general election, and then unsuccessfully contested the 2020 Seanad election. She was an unsuccessful candidate at the 2024 local elections for the Bandon-Kinsale area of Cork County council. She was elected to the Seanad at the 2025 Seanad election.

Dáil	Election	Deputy (Party)	Deputy (Party)	Deputy (Party)
17th	1961	Seán Collins (FG)	Michael Pat Murphy (Lab)	Edward Cotter (FF)
18th	1965	Seán Collins (FG)	Michael Pat Murphy (Lab)	Edward Cotter (FF)
19th	1969	John O'Sullivan (FG)	Michael Pat Murphy (Lab)	Flor Crowley (FF)
20th	1973	John O'Sullivan (FG)	Michael Pat Murphy (Lab)	Flor Crowley (FF)
21st	1977	Jim O'Keeffe (FG)	Michael Pat Murphy (Lab)	Joe Walsh (FF)
22nd	1981	Jim O'Keeffe (FG)	P. J. Sheehan (FG)	Flor Crowley (FF)
23rd	1982 (Feb)	Jim O'Keeffe (FG)	P. J. Sheehan (FG)	Joe Walsh (FF)
24th	1982 (Nov)	Jim O'Keeffe (FG)	P. J. Sheehan (FG)	Joe Walsh (FF)
25th	1987	Jim O'Keeffe (FG)	P. J. Sheehan (FG)	Joe Walsh (FF)
26th	1989	Jim O'Keeffe (FG)	P. J. Sheehan (FG)	Joe Walsh (FF)
27th	1992	Jim O'Keeffe (FG)	P. J. Sheehan (FG)	Joe Walsh (FF)
28th	1997	Jim O'Keeffe (FG)	P. J. Sheehan (FG)	Joe Walsh (FF)
29th	2002	Jim O'Keeffe (FG)	Denis O'Donovan (FF)	Joe Walsh (FF)
30th	2007	Jim O'Keeffe (FG)	P. J. Sheehan (FG)	Christy O'Sullivan (FF)
31st	2011	Jim Daly (FG)	Noel Harrington (FG)	Michael McCarthy (Lab)
32nd	2016	Jim Daly (FG)	Michael Collins (Ind.)	Margaret Murphy O'Mahony (FF)
33rd	2020	Holly Cairns (SD)	Michael Collins (Ind.)	Christopher O'Sullivan (FF)
34th	2024	Holly Cairns (SD)	Michael Collins (II)	Christopher O'Sullivan (FF)
