= Jim O'Keeffe =

Irish former politician (born 1941)

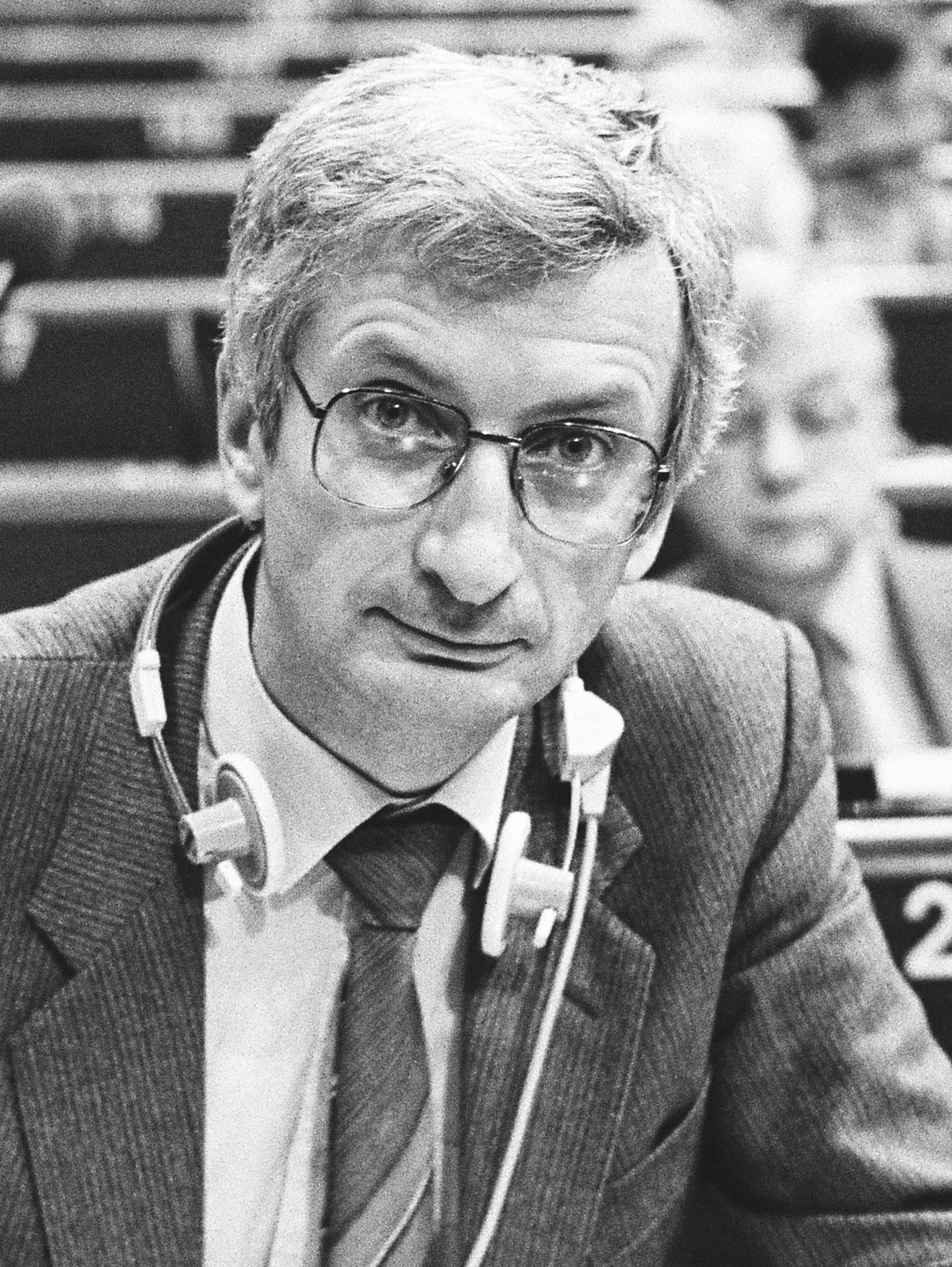
- O'Keeffe in 1984

Minister of State
- 1986–1987: Public Service
- 1982–1986: Foreign Affairs
- 1981–1982: Foreign Affairs

Teachta Dála
- In office June 1977 – February 2011
- Constituency: Cork South-West

Personal details
- Born: 31 March 1941 (age 85) Ireland
- Party: Fine Gael
- Education: University College Cork; University College Dublin

Jim O'Keeffe (born 31 March 1941) is an Irish former Fine Gael politician who served as Minister of State from 1981 to 1982 and again from 1982 to 1987. He served as a Teachta Dála (TD) for the Cork South-West constituency from 1977 to 2011.

O'Keeffe was born in 1941. He was educated at St. Fachtna's High School, Skibbereen; University College Cork; University College Dublin and the Incorporated Law School of the Incorporated Law Society. He practised as a solicitor before entering public office. O'Keeffe was first elected to Dáil Éireann at the 1977 general election as a Fine Gael TD for Cork South-West and retained his seat at each general election until his retirement in 2011.

In June 1981, he was appointed as Minister of State at the Department of Foreign Affairs with responsibility for overseas development by the Fine Gael–Labour Party government led by Garret FitzGerald. This government lasted until March 1982. After a brief period in opposition, the two parties formed a new coalition government in December 1982. O'Keeffe was appointed to the same position. In a reshuffle in February 1986, he was moved and appointed as Minister of State at the Department of the Public Service. He retained this position until March 1987, when Fine Gael returned to opposition.

He held numerous Opposition Front Bench portfolios including Foreign Affairs; Social, Community and Family Affairs; Social Welfare; Agriculture and Health; and Justice, Equality and Law Reform. In 1996–97, he was the first chair of the All-Party Oireachtas Committee on the Constitution. He is a former vice-chairperson of the Joint Oireachtas Committee on the Constitution.

O'Keeffe retired from politics at the 2011 general election.

He was a member of the Standards in Public Office Commission from 11 February 2014 until 10 February 2020.

Political offices
Vacant	Minister of State at the Department of Foreign Affairs; 1981–1982	Vacant
Vacant	Minister of State at the Department of Foreign Affairs; 1982–1986	Succeeded by George Birmingham
Vacant	Minister of State at the Department of the Public Service; 1986–1987	Office abolished

Dáil	Election	Deputy (Party)	Deputy (Party)	Deputy (Party)
17th	1961	Seán Collins (FG)	Michael Pat Murphy (Lab)	Edward Cotter (FF)
18th	1965	Seán Collins (FG)	Michael Pat Murphy (Lab)	Edward Cotter (FF)
19th	1969	John O'Sullivan (FG)	Michael Pat Murphy (Lab)	Flor Crowley (FF)
20th	1973	John O'Sullivan (FG)	Michael Pat Murphy (Lab)	Flor Crowley (FF)
21st	1977	Jim O'Keeffe (FG)	Michael Pat Murphy (Lab)	Joe Walsh (FF)
22nd	1981	Jim O'Keeffe (FG)	P. J. Sheehan (FG)	Flor Crowley (FF)
23rd	1982 (Feb)	Jim O'Keeffe (FG)	P. J. Sheehan (FG)	Joe Walsh (FF)
24th	1982 (Nov)	Jim O'Keeffe (FG)	P. J. Sheehan (FG)	Joe Walsh (FF)
25th	1987	Jim O'Keeffe (FG)	P. J. Sheehan (FG)	Joe Walsh (FF)
26th	1989	Jim O'Keeffe (FG)	P. J. Sheehan (FG)	Joe Walsh (FF)
27th	1992	Jim O'Keeffe (FG)	P. J. Sheehan (FG)	Joe Walsh (FF)
28th	1997	Jim O'Keeffe (FG)	P. J. Sheehan (FG)	Joe Walsh (FF)
29th	2002	Jim O'Keeffe (FG)	Denis O'Donovan (FF)	Joe Walsh (FF)
30th	2007	Jim O'Keeffe (FG)	P. J. Sheehan (FG)	Christy O'Sullivan (FF)
31st	2011	Jim Daly (FG)	Noel Harrington (FG)	Michael McCarthy (Lab)
32nd	2016	Jim Daly (FG)	Michael Collins (Ind.)	Margaret Murphy O'Mahony (FF)
33rd	2020	Holly Cairns (SD)	Michael Collins (Ind.)	Christopher O'Sullivan (FF)
34th	2024	Holly Cairns (SD)	Michael Collins (II)	Christopher O'Sullivan (FF)
