= Brian Crowley =

Irish politician (1964–2026)

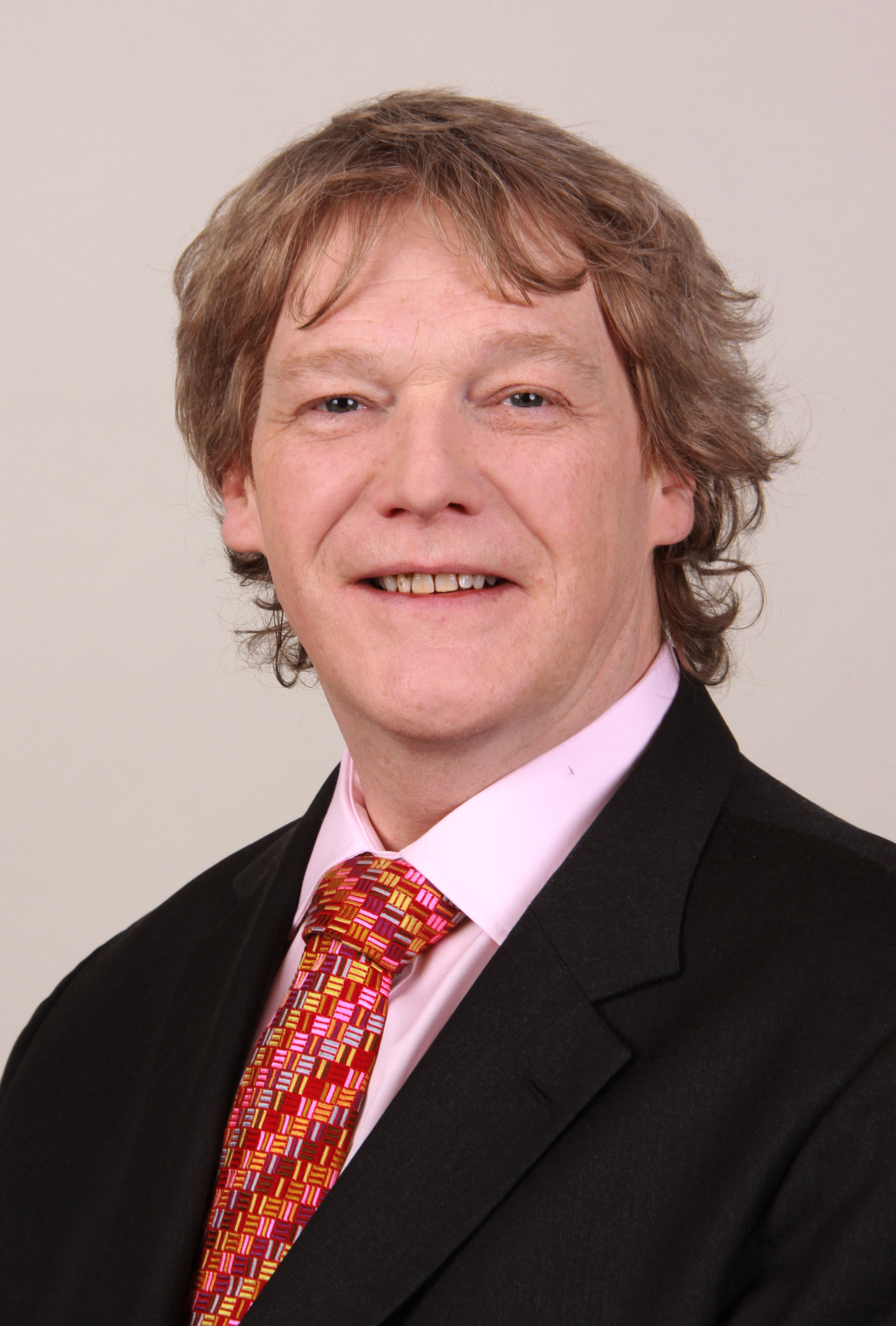
- Crowley in 2014

Member of the European Parliament
- In office 24 June 2004 – 24 May 2019
- Constituency: South
- In office 1 July 1994 – 24 June 2004
- Constituency: Munster

Senator
- In office 17 February 1993 – 31 August 1994
- Constituency: Nominated by the Taoiseach

Personal details
- Born: 4 March 1964 Blackrock, Dublin, Ireland
- Died: 23 January 2026 (aged 61) Cork, Ireland
- Party: Fianna Fáil
- Other political affiliations: ECR
- Parent: Flor Crowley (father)
- Education: University College Cork

Brian Crowley (4 March 1964 – 23 January 2026) was an Irish Fianna Fáil politician who served as a Member of the European Parliament (MEP) for the Munster and South constituencies from 1994 to 2019. He served as a Senator from 1993 to 1994, after being nominated by the Taoiseach.

== Background ==
Crowley was born in Blackrock, Dublin in 1964, but was raised in Bandon, County Cork, where he attended Hamilton High School. He received a diploma in law in 1993 from University College Cork (UCC). His father, Flor Crowley, served as a TD for various Cork constituencies for most of the period between the 1965 general election and the February 1982 election.

Crowley was a wheelchair-user as a result of an accident at age 16.

== Political career ==
In 1993, he was nominated by the Taoiseach Albert Reynolds to the 20th Seanad while he was still a second year law student in UCC.

At the 1994 European Parliament election he was elected to the European Parliament for the Munster constituency. He retained his seat at the three subsequent elections. He was a member of Ireland's Council of State from 1997 to 2004, Committee on Industry, Research and Energy and the delegation for relations with the United States. Crowley also served as a substitute member of the Committee on Legal Affairs.

Crowley stated in an interview with The Irish Times on 29 September 2008 that he would like to run for President of Ireland at the 2011 presidential election.

On 12 February 2009, the Committee on Legal Affairs of the European Parliament approved a report drafted by Brian Crowley to extend the copyright term of music recordings from 50 years to 95 years.

He was co-president of the Union for Europe of the Nations until 2009, when Fianna Fáil joined the Alliance of Liberals and Democrats for Europe group (ALDE) group. He was a member of the ALDE group in the European Parliament from 2009 to 2014.

In June 2011, Crowley refused to release details of his expense and allowance claims as a member of the European Parliament.

Again in July 2011, Crowley declared to Fianna Fáil party colleagues, that he was available to run for the presidency, but had been advised by party colleague Fianna Fáil TD Willie O'Dea not to seek his party's nomination.

Party leader Micheál Martin opted not to run any candidate but preferred to focus on rebuilding the party after the general election earlier that year which saw the party lose 58 seats. In the context of failure to be nominated for the presidential election by his party, Crowley withdrew his candidature for the nomination.

From 2011 to 2013, Crowley had trouble with sores on his legs arising from his paralysis. These required repeated treatment which kept him out of the public eye. In July 2013, he said his health was improved and he intended to run for re-election in 2014.

In June 2014, he joined the European Conservatives and Reformists group in the European Parliament, against the wishes of the Fianna Fáil leadership. He lost the Fianna Fáil party whip on 24 June 2014. Fianna Fáil stated that the principles of the ECR group were incompatible with the party.

In December 2015, concerns were raised about Crowley's frequent absence from the European Parliament due to ill health. A news report in May 2016 stated that Crowley had failed to attend any votes since being re-elected over two years previously. In March 2018, Politico Europe included him in their list of "The 20 MEPs who matter, for the wrong reasons". In June 2018, the Irish Examiner reported that Crowley had not voted in the Parliament since his re-election on 2014. He did not cast a single vote in the 2014 to 2019 session.

On 17 January 2019, Crowley announced at a news conference that he would not seek re-election in the European elections in May 2019, and would be retiring from public life.

== Death ==
Crowley died on 23 January 2026, at the age of 61.

== See also ==
- Families in the Oireachtas
