= Tim Lombard =

Irish politician (born 1976)

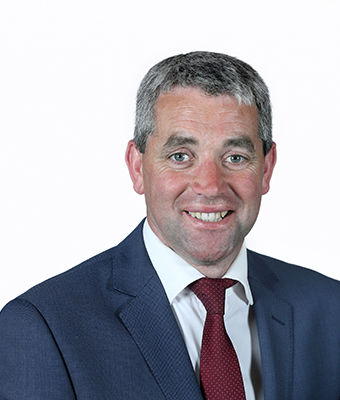
- Lombard in 2016

Senator
- In office 8 June 2016 – 31 January 2025
- Constituency: Agricultural Panel

Personal details
- Born: 17 February 1976 (age 50) Cork, Ireland
- Party: Fine Gael
- Spouse: Catherine Lombard (m. 2003)
- Children: 4
- Education: University College Cork
- Website: timlombard.ie

Tim Lombard (born 17 February 1976) is an Irish Fine Gael politician who served as a Senator for the Agricultural Panel from April 2016 to January 2025.

He was a member of Cork County Council from 2009 to 2016. He was Mayor of County Cork from 2011 to 2012, being the then youngest ever mayor.

He was the Fine Gael Seanad spokesperson on Communications, Climate Action and the Environment. He was an unsuccessful candidate for the Cork South-West constituency at the 2020 and 2024 general elections.

He lost his seat at the 2025 Seanad election.
