= Denis O'Donovan =

Irish politician (born 1955)

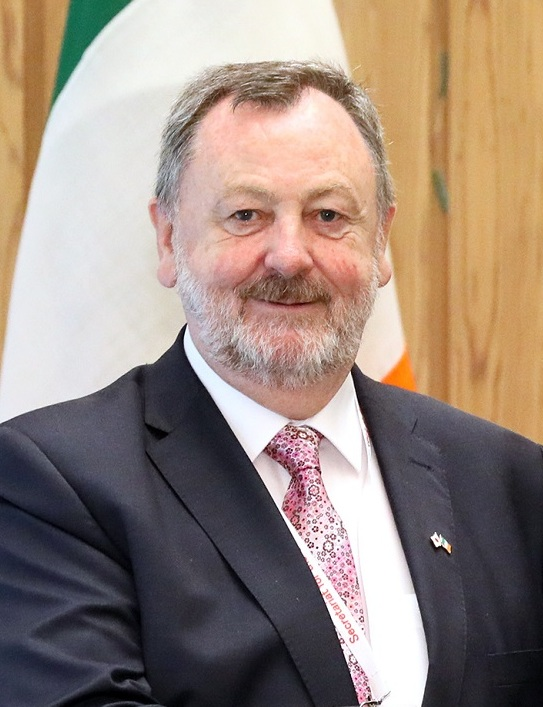

Cathaoirleach of Seanad Éireann
- In office 8 June 2016 – 29 June 2020
- Preceded by: Paddy Burke
- Succeeded by: Mark Daly

Leas-Chathaoirleach of Seanad Éireann
- In office 25 May 2011 – 8 June 2016
- Cathaoirleach: Paddy Burke
- Preceded by: Paddy Burke
- Succeeded by: Paul Coghlan

Senator
- In office 25 May 2011 – 31 January 2025
- Constituency: Agricultural Panel
- In office 13 September 2007 – 25 May 2011
- In office 17 September 1997 – 17 May 2002
- Constituency: Industrial and Commercial Panel
- In office 1 November 1989 – 17 February 1993
- Constituency: Nominated by the Taoiseach

Teachta Dála
- In office May 2002 – May 2007
- Constituency: Cork South-West

Personal details
- Born: 23 July 1955 (age 71) Bantry, County Cork, Ireland
- Party: Fianna Fáil
- Education: University College Cork

Denis O'Donovan (born 23 July 1955) is an Irish Fianna Fáil politician who served as a Senator for the Agricultural Panel from April 2011 to January 2025. He previously served as Cathaoirleach of Seanad Éireann from 2016 to 2020 and Leas-Chathaoirleach of Seanad Éireann from 2011 to 2016. He served as a Teachta Dála (TD) for the Cork South-West constituency from 2002 to 2007.

A native of Bantry, County Cork, he was elected to Cork County Council in 1985, and re-elected in 1991 and 1999. He was nominated by the Taoiseach to the Seanad in 1989. He was an unsuccessful candidate at the 1993 Seanad election but was elected to the Seanad in 1997 as a Senator for the Industrial and Commercial Panel. O'Donovan was elected to Dáil Éireann, on his fifth attempt, at the 2002 general election for the Cork South-West constituency. He lost his Dáil seat at the 2007 general election, however, he was subsequently elected to the Seanad.

O'Donovan was the Chair of the all-party Oireachtas Committee on the Constitution, established in December 2002 to review the Constitution. He has a degree in law from University College Cork and is a qualified solicitor.

In June 2010, he lost the Fianna Fáil parliamentary party whip when he failed to support the government on the Dog Breeding Establishment bill. He was a Fianna Fáil candidate at the 2011 general election for Cork South-West but was not elected. He was re-elected to the Seanad in April 2011. He was Leas-Chathaoirleach (Deputy Chairperson) of the 24th Seanad. He was re-elected again to Seanad Éireann on the Agricultural Panel in April 2016 and again in April 2020.

He served as Cathaoirleach of Seanad Éireann from 8 June 2016 until 29 June 2020. He is the Fianna Fáil Seanad spokesperson on Marine and Fisheries.

He did not contest the 2025 Seanad election.

Oireachtas
Preceded by Paddy Burke	Cathaoirleach of Seanad Éireann; 2016–2020	Succeeded by Mark Daly

Dáil	Election	Deputy (Party)	Deputy (Party)	Deputy (Party)
17th	1961	Seán Collins (FG)	Michael Pat Murphy (Lab)	Edward Cotter (FF)
18th	1965	Seán Collins (FG)	Michael Pat Murphy (Lab)	Edward Cotter (FF)
19th	1969	John O'Sullivan (FG)	Michael Pat Murphy (Lab)	Flor Crowley (FF)
20th	1973	John O'Sullivan (FG)	Michael Pat Murphy (Lab)	Flor Crowley (FF)
21st	1977	Jim O'Keeffe (FG)	Michael Pat Murphy (Lab)	Joe Walsh (FF)
22nd	1981	Jim O'Keeffe (FG)	P. J. Sheehan (FG)	Flor Crowley (FF)
23rd	1982 (Feb)	Jim O'Keeffe (FG)	P. J. Sheehan (FG)	Joe Walsh (FF)
24th	1982 (Nov)	Jim O'Keeffe (FG)	P. J. Sheehan (FG)	Joe Walsh (FF)
25th	1987	Jim O'Keeffe (FG)	P. J. Sheehan (FG)	Joe Walsh (FF)
26th	1989	Jim O'Keeffe (FG)	P. J. Sheehan (FG)	Joe Walsh (FF)
27th	1992	Jim O'Keeffe (FG)	P. J. Sheehan (FG)	Joe Walsh (FF)
28th	1997	Jim O'Keeffe (FG)	P. J. Sheehan (FG)	Joe Walsh (FF)
29th	2002	Jim O'Keeffe (FG)	Denis O'Donovan (FF)	Joe Walsh (FF)
30th	2007	Jim O'Keeffe (FG)	P. J. Sheehan (FG)	Christy O'Sullivan (FF)
31st	2011	Jim Daly (FG)	Noel Harrington (FG)	Michael McCarthy (Lab)
32nd	2016	Jim Daly (FG)	Michael Collins (Ind.)	Margaret Murphy O'Mahony (FF)
33rd	2020	Holly Cairns (SD)	Michael Collins (Ind.)	Christopher O'Sullivan (FF)
34th	2024	Holly Cairns (SD)	Michael Collins (II)	Christopher O'Sullivan (FF)
