= Joe Walsh (Irish politician) =

Irish politician (1943–2014)

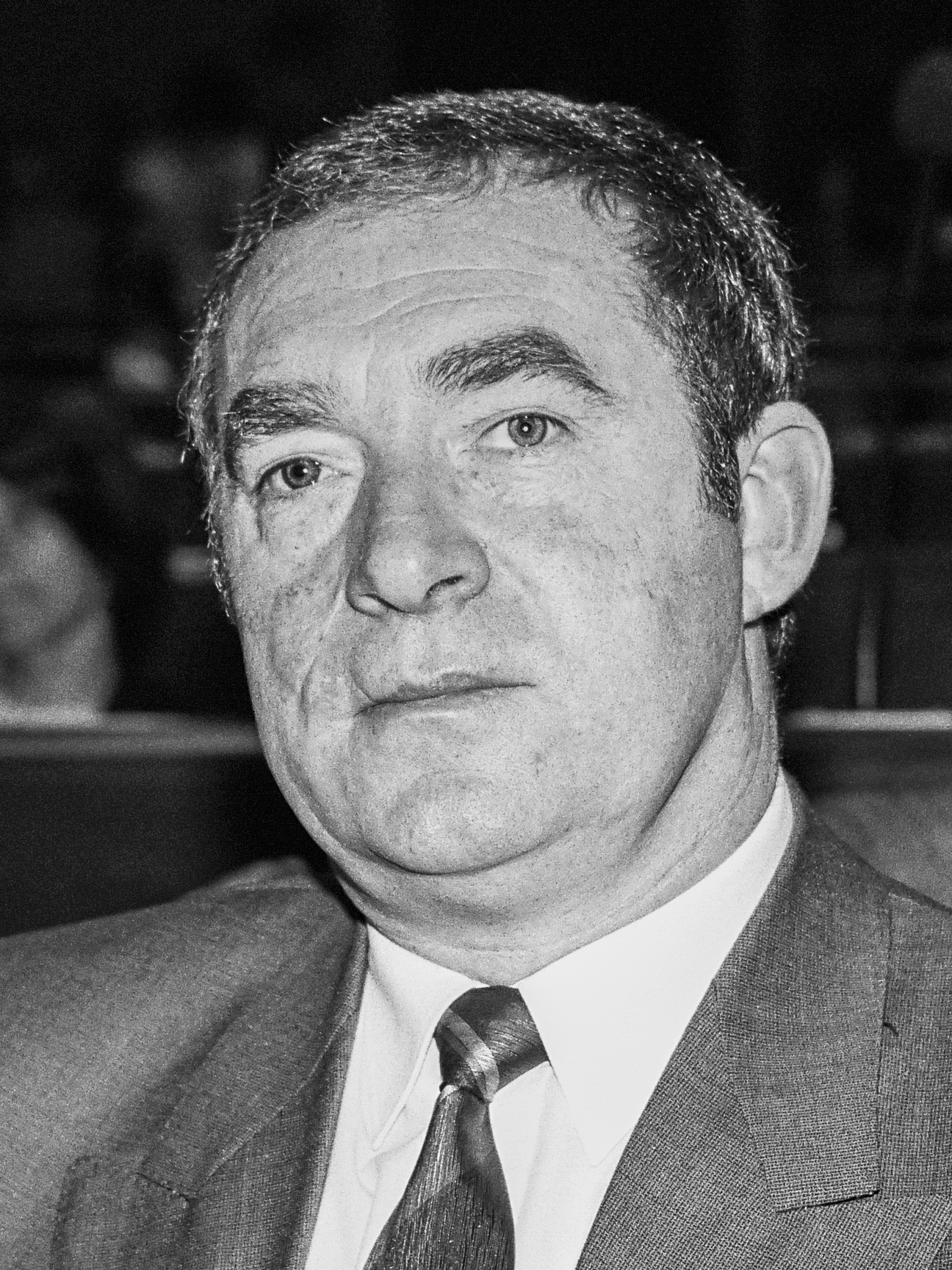
- Walsh in 1990

Minister for Agriculture and Food
- In office 26 June 1997 – 29 September 2004
- Taoiseach: Bertie Ahern
- Preceded by: Ivan Yates
- Succeeded by: Mary Coughlan
- In office 11 February 1992 – 15 December 1994
- Taoiseach: Albert Reynolds
- Preceded by: Michael Woods
- Succeeded by: Ivan Yates

Minister of State
- 1987–1992: Agriculture and Food

Teachta Dála
- In office February 1982 – May 2007
- In office June 1977 – June 1981
- Constituency: Cork South-West

Senator
- In office 8 October 1981 – 18 February 1982
- Constituency: Cultural and Educational Panel

Personal details
- Born: 1 May 1943 Ballineen, County Cork, Ireland
- Died: 9 November 2014 (aged 71) Wilton, Cork, Ireland
- Party: Fianna Fáil
- Spouse: Marie Donegan (m. 1970)
- Children: 5
- Education: University College Cork

Joseph Walsh (1 May 1943 – 9 November 2014) was an Irish Fianna Fáil politician who served as Minister for Agriculture and Food from 1992 to 1994 and 1997 to 2004. He served as a Teachta Dála (TD) for the Cork South-West constituency from 1977 to 1981 and 1982 to 2007. He was a Senator elected by the Cultural and Educational Panel from 1981 to 1982.

== Early life ==
Walsh was born in May 1943 in Ballineen, County Cork, the third child of five sons and three daughters of Richard Walsh, a farmer of Kilmoylerane, Ballinascarthy, County Cork, and his wife Margaret (née Dullea). He was educated at St Finbarr's College, Cork, and University College Cork, where he qualified with a degree in Dairy Science in 1970. During his time at the university, he became involved in politics, establishing the first Fianna Fáil cumann in the university. Walsh began his career as a researcher in the National Dairy Research Centre at Moorepark, near Fermoy, before becoming managing director of Strand Dairies in Clonakilty, County Cork.

== Political career ==
He began his political career when he was elected a member of Cork County Council in 1974, remaining on the council until the 1991 local elections. He was elected to Dáil Éireann on his first attempt when he was returned as a Fianna Fáil TD for the Cork South-West at the 1977 general election. Walsh lost his seat at the 1981 general election but secured election by the Cultural and Educational Panel to Seanad Éireann. He was re-elected to the Dáil at the February 1982 general election and retained his seat at every subsequent election until his retirement in 2007.

In the 1980s, Walsh was one of the Gang of 22 who opposed Charles Haughey's leadership of Fianna Fáil. Despite this, he was appointed Minister of State at the Department of Agriculture and Food when Haughey returned as Taoiseach after the 1987 general election. In 1989, he was a key figure in the negotiations which led to the formation of the historic Fianna Fáil-Progressive Democrats coalition government. He remained as Minister of State until 1992 when Albert Reynolds became Taoiseach. Walsh was appointed to the Cabinet as Minister for Agriculture and Food in February of the same year. He remained in that position until December 1994. In 1997, Fianna Fáil returned to power, and Walsh was again appointed Minister for Agriculture and Food in Bertie Ahern's government.

When Ireland was confronted with a foot-and-mouth disease crisis in 2001, Walsh introduced control measures to prevent a full-scale outbreak, such as curtailing the movement of animals during football games and postponing sports events, including the 2001 Six Nations Championship.

He received several awards, including the Légion d'honneur and the Grand Cross of the Agricultural Order of Merit of Spain. On 13 August 2004, he announced that he would retire from the Cabinet after spending 14 years of his career at the Department of Agriculture.

He sat on the board of the Bank of Ireland and received annual Oireachtas pension payments of €119,177.

== Death ==
Walsh died at Cork University Hospital on 9 November 2014, after a "short illness".

Political offices
Preceded by Patrick Hegarty; Paul Connaughton Snr	Minister of State at the Department of Agriculture and Food; 1987–1992; With: Séamus Kirk	Succeeded by John Browne; Liam Hyland
Preceded by Michael Woods	Minister for Agriculture and Food; 1992–1994	Succeeded by Ivan Yates
Preceded by Ivan Yates	Minister for Agriculture and Food; 1997–2004	Succeeded by Mary Coughlan

Dáil	Election	Deputy (Party)	Deputy (Party)	Deputy (Party)
17th	1961	Seán Collins (FG)	Michael Pat Murphy (Lab)	Edward Cotter (FF)
18th	1965	Seán Collins (FG)	Michael Pat Murphy (Lab)	Edward Cotter (FF)
19th	1969	John O'Sullivan (FG)	Michael Pat Murphy (Lab)	Flor Crowley (FF)
20th	1973	John O'Sullivan (FG)	Michael Pat Murphy (Lab)	Flor Crowley (FF)
21st	1977	Jim O'Keeffe (FG)	Michael Pat Murphy (Lab)	Joe Walsh (FF)
22nd	1981	Jim O'Keeffe (FG)	P. J. Sheehan (FG)	Flor Crowley (FF)
23rd	1982 (Feb)	Jim O'Keeffe (FG)	P. J. Sheehan (FG)	Joe Walsh (FF)
24th	1982 (Nov)	Jim O'Keeffe (FG)	P. J. Sheehan (FG)	Joe Walsh (FF)
25th	1987	Jim O'Keeffe (FG)	P. J. Sheehan (FG)	Joe Walsh (FF)
26th	1989	Jim O'Keeffe (FG)	P. J. Sheehan (FG)	Joe Walsh (FF)
27th	1992	Jim O'Keeffe (FG)	P. J. Sheehan (FG)	Joe Walsh (FF)
28th	1997	Jim O'Keeffe (FG)	P. J. Sheehan (FG)	Joe Walsh (FF)
29th	2002	Jim O'Keeffe (FG)	Denis O'Donovan (FF)	Joe Walsh (FF)
30th	2007	Jim O'Keeffe (FG)	P. J. Sheehan (FG)	Christy O'Sullivan (FF)
31st	2011	Jim Daly (FG)	Noel Harrington (FG)	Michael McCarthy (Lab)
32nd	2016	Jim Daly (FG)	Michael Collins (Ind.)	Margaret Murphy O'Mahony (FF)
33rd	2020	Holly Cairns (SD)	Michael Collins (Ind.)	Christopher O'Sullivan (FF)
34th	2024	Holly Cairns (SD)	Michael Collins (II)	Christopher O'Sullivan (FF)
