= 23rd Dáil =

TDs from March to November 1982

| ← | 22nd Dáil | 24th Dáil | → |

Overview
- Legislative body: Dáil Éireann
- Jurisdiction: Ireland
- Meeting place: Leinster House
- Term: 9 March 1982 – 4 November 1982
- Election: February 1982 general election
- Government: 18th government of Ireland
- Members: 166
- Ceann Comhairle: John O'Connell
- Taoiseach: Charles Haughey
- Tánaiste: Ray MacSharry
- Chief Whip: Bertie Ahern
- Leader of the Opposition: Garret FitzGerald

Sessions
- 1st: 9 March 1982 – 16 July 1982
- 2nd: 27 October 1982 – 4 November 1982

The 23rd Dáil was elected at the February 1982 general election on 18 February 1982 and met on 9 March 1982. The members of Dáil Éireann, the house of representatives of the Oireachtas (legislature), of Ireland are known as TDs. It sat with the 16th Seanad as the two Houses of the Oireachtas.

On 4 November 1982, President Patrick Hillery dissolved the Dáil at the request of the Taoiseach Charles Haughey after the loss of a vote of confidence. The 23rd Dáil is the third shortest Dáil in history, lasting 240 days.

== Composition of the 23rd Dáil ==
- 18th government

| Party | Feb. 1982 | Nov. 1982 | Change |
|---|---|---|---|
| Fianna Fáil | 81 | 80 | ▼1 |
| Fine Gael | 63 | 64 | ▲1 |
| Labour | 15 | 14 | ▼1 |
| Sinn Féin The Workers' Party | 3 | 3 | Steady |
| Democratic Socialist | —N/a | 1 | ▲1 |
| Independent Fianna Fáil | 1 | 1 | Steady |
| Independent | 3 | 1 | ▼2 |
| Ceann Comhairle | —N/a | 1 | ▲1 |
| Vacant | —N/a | 1 | ▲1 |
| Total | 166 | | |

Fianna Fáil formed the 18th government of Ireland, a minority government that relied on the support of independents Tony Gregory, Neil Blaney and Sinn Féin The Workers' Party.

=== Graphical representation ===
This is a graphical comparison of party strengths in the 23rd Dáil from March 1982. This was not the official seating plan.

== Ceann Comhairle ==
On the meeting of the Dáil, John O'Connell (Ind), who had served as Ceann Comhairle in the previous Dáil, was proposed by Neil Blaney (IFF) and seconded by Garret FitzGerald (FG) for the position. He was elected without a vote.

On 23 March 1982, Jim Tunney (FF) was proposed by Bertie Ahern (FF) for the position of Leas-Cheann Comhairle. Paddy Harte (FG) was proposed by Garret FitzGerald (FG) and seconded by Peter Barry (FG). The Dáil divided 80 to 80 on the appointment of Tunney. O'Connell gave his casting vote in favour of Tunney.

== TDs by constituency ==
The list of the 166 TDs elected is given in alphabetical order by Dáil constituency.

Members of the 23rd Dáil
| Constituency | Name | Party |
|---|---|---|
| Carlow–Kilkenny | Liam Aylward | Fianna Fáil |
| Carlow–Kilkenny | Kieran Crotty | Fine Gael |
| Carlow–Kilkenny | Jim Gibbons | Fianna Fáil |
| Carlow–Kilkenny | Desmond Governey | Fine Gael |
| Carlow–Kilkenny | Séamus Pattison | Labour |
| Cavan–Monaghan | John Conlan | Fine Gael |
| Cavan–Monaghan | Tom Fitzpatrick | Fine Gael |
| Cavan–Monaghan | Jimmy Leonard | Fianna Fáil |
| Cavan–Monaghan | Rory O'Hanlon | Fianna Fáil |
| Cavan–Monaghan | John Wilson | Fianna Fáil |
| Clare | Sylvester Barrett | Fianna Fáil |
| Clare | Donal Carey | Fine Gael |
| Clare | Brendan Daly | Fianna Fáil |
| Clare | Bill Loughnane | Fianna Fáil |
| Cork East | Michael Ahern | Fianna Fáil |
| Cork East | Myra Barry | Fine Gael |
| Cork East | Patrick Hegarty | Fine Gael |
| Cork East | Joe Sherlock | Sinn Féin The Workers' Party |
| Cork North-Central | Bernard Allen | Fine Gael |
| Cork North-Central | Liam Burke | Fine Gael |
| Cork North-Central | Seán French | Fianna Fáil |
| Cork North-Central | Denis Lyons | Fianna Fáil |
| Cork North-Central | Toddy O'Sullivan | Labour |
| Cork North-West | Donal Creed | Fine Gael |
| Cork North-West | Frank Crowley | Fine Gael |
| Cork North-West | Thomas Meaney | Fianna Fáil |
| Cork South-Central | Peter Barry | Fine Gael |
| Cork South-Central | Jim Corr | Fine Gael |
| Cork South-Central | Eileen Desmond | Labour |
| Cork South-Central | Gene Fitzgerald | Fianna Fáil |
| Cork South-Central | Pearse Wyse | Fianna Fáil |
| Cork South-West | Jim O'Keeffe | Fine Gael |
| Cork South-West | P. J. Sheehan | Fine Gael |
| Cork South-West | Joe Walsh | Fianna Fáil |
| Donegal North-East | Neil Blaney | Independent Fianna Fáil |
| Donegal North-East | Hugh Conaghan | Fianna Fáil |
| Donegal North-East | Paddy Harte | Fine Gael |
| Donegal South-West | Clement Coughlan | Fianna Fáil |
| Donegal South-West | Pat "the Cope" Gallagher | Fianna Fáil |
| Donegal South-West | Dinny McGinley | Fine Gael |
| Dublin Central | Bertie Ahern | Fianna Fáil |
| Dublin Central | George Colley | Fianna Fáil |
| Dublin Central | Tony Gregory | Independent |
| Dublin Central | Michael Keating | Fine Gael |
| Dublin Central | Michael O'Leary | Labour |
| Dublin North | John Boland | Fine Gael |
| Dublin North | Ray Burke | Fianna Fáil |
| Dublin North | Nora Owen | Fine Gael |
| Dublin North-Central | George Birmingham | Fine Gael |
| Dublin North-Central | Vincent Brady | Fianna Fáil |
| Dublin North-Central | Richard Bruton | Fine Gael |
| Dublin North-Central | Charles Haughey | Fianna Fáil |
| Dublin North-East | Ned Brennan | Fianna Fáil |
| Dublin North-East | Michael Joe Cosgrave | Fine Gael |
| Dublin North-East | Maurice Manning | Fine Gael |
| Dublin North-East | Michael Woods | Fianna Fáil |
| Dublin North-West | Michael Barrett | Fianna Fáil |
| Dublin North-West | Proinsias De Rossa | Sinn Féin The Workers' Party |
| Dublin North-West | Mary Flaherty | Fine Gael |
| Dublin North-West | Jim Tunney | Fianna Fáil |
| Dublin South | Niall Andrews | Fianna Fáil |
| Dublin South | Séamus Brennan | Fianna Fáil |
| Dublin South | Nuala Fennell | Fine Gael |
| Dublin South | John Kelly | Fine Gael |
| Dublin South | Alan Shatter | Fine Gael |
| Dublin South-Central | Ben Briscoe | Fianna Fáil |
| Dublin South-Central | Frank Cluskey | Labour |
| Dublin South-Central | Tom Fitzpatrick | Fianna Fáil |
| Dublin South-Central | Gay Mitchell | Fine Gael |
| Dublin South-Central | John O'Connell | Independent |
| Dublin South-East | Gerard Brady | Fianna Fáil |
| Dublin South-East | Alexis FitzGerald | Fine Gael |
| Dublin South-East | Garret FitzGerald | Fine Gael |
| Dublin South-East | Ruairi Quinn | Labour |
| Dublin South-West | Mary Harney | Fianna Fáil |
| Dublin South-West | Larry McMahon | Fine Gael |
| Dublin South-West | Mervyn Taylor | Labour |
| Dublin South-West | Seán Walsh | Fianna Fáil |
| Dublin West | Richard Burke | Fine Gael |
| Dublin West | Brian Fleming | Fine Gael |
| Dublin West | Liam Lawlor | Fianna Fáil |
| Dublin West | Brian Lenihan | Fianna Fáil |
| Dublin West | Jim Mitchell | Fine Gael |
| Dún Laoghaire | David Andrews | Fianna Fáil |
| Dún Laoghaire | Seán Barrett | Fine Gael |
| Dún Laoghaire | Liam T. Cosgrave | Fine Gael |
| Dún Laoghaire | Barry Desmond | Labour |
| Dún Laoghaire | Martin O'Donoghue | Fianna Fáil |
| Galway East | Johnny Callanan | Fianna Fáil |
| Galway East | Paul Connaughton Snr | Fine Gael |
| Galway East | Michael P. Kitt | Fianna Fáil |
| Galway West | John Donnellan | Fine Gael |
| Galway West | Frank Fahey | Fianna Fáil |
| Galway West | Máire Geoghegan-Quinn | Fianna Fáil |
| Galway West | Michael D. Higgins | Labour |
| Galway West | Bobby Molloy | Fianna Fáil |
| Kerry North | Denis Foley | Fianna Fáil |
| Kerry North | Tom McEllistrim | Fianna Fáil |
| Kerry North | Dick Spring | Labour |
| Kerry South | Michael Begley | Fine Gael |
| Kerry South | Michael Moynihan | Labour |
| Kerry South | John O'Leary | Fianna Fáil |
| Kildare | Joseph Bermingham | Labour |
| Kildare | Gerry Brady | Fianna Fáil |
| Kildare | Alan Dukes | Fine Gael |
| Kildare | Charlie McCreevy | Fianna Fáil |
| Kildare | Paddy Power | Fianna Fáil |
| Laois–Offaly | Ger Connolly | Fianna Fáil |
| Laois–Offaly | Bernard Cowen | Fianna Fáil |
| Laois–Offaly | Tom Enright | Fine Gael |
| Laois–Offaly | Oliver J. Flanagan | Fine Gael |
| Laois–Offaly | Liam Hyland | Fianna Fáil |
| Limerick East | Jim Kemmy | Democratic Socialist |
| Limerick East | Michael Noonan | Fine Gael |
| Limerick East | Willie O'Dea | Fianna Fáil |
| Limerick East | Tom O'Donnell | Fine Gael |
| Limerick East | Desmond O'Malley | Fianna Fáil |
| Limerick West | Gerry Collins | Fianna Fáil |
| Limerick West | Michael J. Noonan | Fianna Fáil |
| Limerick West | William O'Brien | Fine Gael |
| Longford–Westmeath | Patrick Cooney | Fine Gael |
| Longford–Westmeath | Seán Keegan | Fianna Fáil |
| Longford–Westmeath | Gerry L'Estrange | Fine Gael |
| Longford–Westmeath | Albert Reynolds | Fianna Fáil |
| Louth | Thomas Bellew | Fianna Fáil |
| Louth | Pádraig Faulkner | Fianna Fáil |
| Louth | Eddie Filgate | Fianna Fáil |
| Louth | Bernard Markey | Fine Gael |
| Mayo East | Seán Calleary | Fianna Fáil |
| Mayo East | P. J. Morley | Fianna Fáil |
| Mayo East | Paddy O'Toole | Fine Gael |
| Mayo West | Pádraig Flynn | Fianna Fáil |
| Mayo West | Denis Gallagher | Fianna Fáil |
| Mayo West | Enda Kenny | Fine Gael |
| Meath | John Bruton | Fine Gael |
| Meath | John Farrelly | Fine Gael |
| Meath | Jim Fitzsimons | Fianna Fáil |
| Meath | Colm Hilliard | Fianna Fáil |
| Meath | Michael Lynch | Fianna Fáil |
| Roscommon | Seán Doherty | Fianna Fáil |
| Roscommon | Terry Leyden | Fianna Fáil |
| Roscommon | Liam Naughten | Fine Gael |
| Sligo–Leitrim | Matt Brennan | Fianna Fáil |
| Sligo–Leitrim | John Ellis | Fianna Fáil |
| Sligo–Leitrim | Ray MacSharry | Fianna Fáil |
| Sligo–Leitrim | Ted Nealon | Fine Gael |
| Tipperary North | David Molony | Fine Gael |
| Tipperary North | Michael O'Kennedy | Fianna Fáil |
| Tipperary North | John Ryan | Labour |
| Tipperary South | Seán Byrne | Fianna Fáil |
| Tipperary South | Brendan Griffin | Fine Gael |
| Tipperary South | Seán McCarthy | Fianna Fáil |
| Tipperary South | Seán Treacy | Labour |
| Waterford | Edward Collins | Fine Gael |
| Waterford | Austin Deasy | Fine Gael |
| Waterford | Jackie Fahey | Fianna Fáil |
| Waterford | Patrick Gallagher | Sinn Féin The Workers' Party |
| Wexford | Lorcan Allen | Fianna Fáil |
| Wexford | Seán Browne | Fianna Fáil |
| Wexford | Hugh Byrne | Fianna Fáil |
| Wexford | Michael D'Arcy | Fine Gael |
| Wexford | Ivan Yates | Fine Gael |
| Wicklow | Gemma Hussey | Fine Gael |
| Wicklow | Liam Kavanagh | Labour |
| Wicklow | Ciarán Murphy | Fianna Fáil |
| Wicklow | Godfrey Timmins | Fine Gael |

== Changes ==
| Date | Constituency | Loss | Gain | Note |
|---|---|---|---|---|
| 9 March 1982 | Dublin South-Central | Independent | Ceann Comhairle | John O'Connell takes office as Ceann Comhairle |
| 30 March 1982 | Dublin West | Fine Gael | | Resignation of Richard Burke on his nomination as European Commissioner |
| 25 May 1982 | Dublin West | | Fine Gael | Liam Skelly holds seat vacated by the resignation of Burke |
| 15 June 1982 | Galway East | Fianna Fáil | | Death of Johnny Callanan |
| 20 July 1982 | Galway East | | Fianna Fáil | Noel Treacy holds seat vacated by the death of Callanan |
| 18 October 1982 | Clare | Fianna Fáil | | Death of Bill Loughnane |
| 28 October 1982 | Dublin Central | Labour | Independent | Michael O'Leary resigns as Labour Party leader and party member |
| 3 November 1982 | Dublin Central | Independent | Fine Gael | Michael O'Leary joins Fine Gael |

On 27 October 1982, a writ to fill the vacancy in Clare was carried by a vote of 84 to 77. This writ was cancelled when the Dáil was dissolved on 4 November 1982.
