= 22nd Dáil =

TDs from June 1981 to January 1982

| ← | 21st Dáil | 23rd Dáil | → |

Overview
- Legislative body: Dáil Éireann
- Jurisdiction: Ireland
- Meeting place: Leinster House
- Term: 30 June 1981 – 27 January 1982
- Election: 1981 general election
- Government: 17th government of Ireland
- Members: 166
- Ceann Comhairle: John O'Connell
- Taoiseach: Garret FitzGerald
- Tánaiste: Michael O'Leary
- Chief Whip: Fergus O'Brien — Gerry L'Estrange until 11 November 1981
- Leader of the Opposition: Charles Haughey

Sessions
- 1st: 30 June 1981 – 23 July 1981
- 2nd: 20 October 1981 – 27 January 1982

The 22nd Dáil was elected at the 1981 general election on 11 June 1981 and met on 30 June 1981. The members of Dáil Éireann, the house of representatives of the Oireachtas (legislature), of Ireland are known as TDs. It sat with the 15th Seanad as the two Houses of the Oireachtas.

On 27 January 1982, President Patrick Hillery dissolved the Dáil at the request of the Taoiseach Garret FitzGerald. The 22nd Dáil is the second shortest Dáil in history, lasting 211 days. There were no by-elections during the 22nd Dáil.

== Composition of the 22nd Dáil ==
- 17th government coalition parties

| Party | June 1981 | Jan. 1982 | Change |
|---|---|---|---|
| Fianna Fáil | 78 | 78 | Steady |
| Fine Gael | 65 | 65 | Steady |
| Labour | 15 | 15 | Steady |
| Anti H-Block | 2 | 0 | ▼2 |
| Sinn Féin The Workers' Party | 1 | 1 | Steady |
| Socialist Labour | 1 | 1 | Steady |
| Independent Fianna Fáil | 1 | 1 | Steady |
| Independent | 3 | 2 | ▼1 |
| Ceann Comhairle | —N/a | 1 | ▲1 |
| Vacant | —N/a | 2 | ▲2 |
| Total | 166 | | |

Fine Gael and the Labour Party formed the 17th government of Ireland with Garrett FitzGerald as Taoiseach. The government was a minority government and relied on the support of independents.

=== Graphical representation ===
This is a graphical comparison of party strengths in the 22nd Dáil from June 1981. This was not the official seating plan.

== Ceann Comhairle ==
On the meeting of the Dáil, John O'Connell (Ind) was proposed by Peter Barry (FG) and seconded by James Tully (Lab) for the position of Ceann Comhairle. He was elected without a vote.

== TDs by constituency ==
The list of the 166 TDs elected is given in alphabetical order by Dáil constituency.

Members of the 22nd Dáil
| Constituency | Name | Party |
|---|---|---|
| Carlow–Kilkenny | Liam Aylward | Fianna Fáil |
| Carlow–Kilkenny | Kieran Crotty | Fine Gael |
| Carlow–Kilkenny | Desmond Governey | Fine Gael |
| Carlow–Kilkenny | Tom Nolan | Fianna Fáil |
| Carlow–Kilkenny | Séamus Pattison | Labour |
| Cavan–Monagahan | John Conlan | Fine Gael |
| Cavan–Monagahan | Kieran Doherty (Note: Contested election under Anti H-Block label.) | Independent |
| Cavan–Monagahan | Tom Fitzpatrick | Fine Gael |
| Cavan–Monagahan | Rory O'Hanlon | Fianna Fáil |
| Cavan–Monagahan | John Wilson | Fianna Fáil |
| Clare | Sylvester Barrett | Fianna Fáil |
| Clare | Brendan Daly | Fianna Fáil |
| Clare | Bill Loughnane | Fianna Fáil |
| Clare | Madeline Taylor | Fine Gael |
| Cork East | Myra Barry | Fine Gael |
| Cork East | Patrick Hegarty | Fine Gael |
| Cork East | Carey Joyce | Fianna Fáil |
| Cork East | Joe Sherlock | Sinn Féin The Workers' Party |
| Cork North-Central | Bernard Allen | Fine Gael |
| Cork North-Central | Liam Burke | Fine Gael |
| Cork North-Central | Seán French | Fianna Fáil |
| Cork North-Central | Denis Lyons | Fianna Fáil |
| Cork North-Central | Toddy O'Sullivan | Labour |
| Cork North-West | Donal Creed | Fine Gael |
| Cork North-West | Frank Crowley | Fine Gael |
| Cork North-West | Thomas Meaney | Fianna Fáil |
| Cork South-Central | Peter Barry | Fine Gael |
| Cork South-Central | Hugh Coveney | Fine Gael |
| Cork South-Central | Eileen Desmond | Labour |
| Cork South-Central | Gene Fitzgerald | Fianna Fáil |
| Cork South-Central | Pearse Wyse | Fianna Fáil |
| Cork South-West | Flor Crowley | Fianna Fáil |
| Cork South-West | Jim O'Keeffe | Fine Gael |
| Cork South-West | P. J. Sheehan | Fine Gael |
| Donegal North-East | Neil Blaney (Note: Blaney was a member of Independent Fianna Fáil.) | Independent |
| Donegal North-East | Hugh Conaghan | Fianna Fáil |
| Donegal North-East | Paddy Harte | Fine Gael |
| Donegal South-West | Clement Coughlan | Fianna Fáil |
| Donegal South-West | Pat "the Cope" Gallagher | Fianna Fáil |
| Donegal South-West | James White | Fine Gael |
| Dublin Central | Bertie Ahern | Fianna Fáil |
| Dublin Central | George Colley | Fianna Fáil |
| Dublin Central | Alice Glenn | Fine Gael |
| Dublin Central | Michael Keating | Fine Gael |
| Dublin Central | Michael O'Leary | Labour |
| Dublin North | Ray Burke | Fianna Fáil |
| Dublin North | John Boland | Fine Gael |
| Dublin North | Nora Owen | Fine Gael |
| Dublin North-Central | George Birmingham | Fine Gael |
| Dublin North-Central | Vincent Brady | Fianna Fáil |
| Dublin North-Central | Noël Browne | Socialist Labour |
| Dublin North-Central | Charles Haughey | Fianna Fáil |
| Dublin North-East | Michael Joe Cosgrave | Fine Gael |
| Dublin North-East | Liam Fitzgerald | Fianna Fáil |
| Dublin North-East | Seán Loftus | Independent |
| Dublin North-East | Michael Woods | Fianna Fáil |
| Dublin North-West | Michael Barrett | Fianna Fáil |
| Dublin North-West | Hugh Byrne | Fine Gael |
| Dublin North-West | Mary Flaherty | Fine Gael |
| Dublin North-West | Jim Tunney | Fianna Fáil |
| Dublin South | Niall Andrews | Fianna Fáil |
| Dublin South | Séamus Brennan | Fianna Fáil |
| Dublin South | Nuala Fennell | Fine Gael |
| Dublin South | John Kelly | Fine Gael |
| Dublin South | Alan Shatter | Fine Gael |
| Dublin South-Central | Ben Briscoe | Fianna Fáil |
| Dublin South-Central | Tom Fitzpatrick | Fianna Fáil |
| Dublin South-Central | Gay Mitchell | Fine Gael |
| Dublin South-Central | Fergus O'Brien | Fine Gael |
| Dublin South-Central | John O'Connell | Independent |
| Dublin South-East | Gerard Brady | Fianna Fáil |
| Dublin South-East | Garret FitzGerald | Fine Gael |
| Dublin South-East | Seán Moore | Fianna Fáil |
| Dublin South-East | Richie Ryan | Fine Gael |
| Dublin South-West | Mary Harney | Fianna Fáil |
| Dublin South-West | Larry McMahon | Fine Gael |
| Dublin South-West | Mervyn Taylor | Labour |
| Dublin South-West | Seán Walsh | Fianna Fáil |
| Dublin West | Richard Burke | Fine Gael |
| Dublin West | Brian Fleming | Fine Gael |
| Dublin West | Eileen Lemass | Fianna Fáil |
| Dublin West | Brian Lenihan | Fianna Fáil |
| Dublin West | Jim Mitchell | Fine Gael |
| Dún Laoghaire | David Andrews | Fianna Fáil |
| Dún Laoghaire | Seán Barrett | Fine Gael |
| Dún Laoghaire | Liam T. Cosgrave | Fine Gael |
| Dún Laoghaire | Barry Desmond | Labour |
| Dún Laoghaire | Martin O'Donoghue | Fianna Fáil |
| Galway East | Johnny Callanan | Fianna Fáil |
| Galway East | Paul Connaughton Snr | Fine Gael |
| Galway East | Michael P. Kitt | Fianna Fáil |
| Galway West | John Donnellan | Fine Gael |
| Galway West | Máire Geoghegan-Quinn | Fianna Fáil |
| Galway West | Michael D. Higgins | Labour |
| Galway West | Mark Killilea Jnr | Fianna Fáil |
| Galway West | Bobby Molloy | Fianna Fáil |
| Kerry North | Denis Foley | Fianna Fáil |
| Kerry North | Tom McEllistrim | Fianna Fáil |
| Kerry North | Dick Spring | Labour |
| Kerry South | Michael Begley | Fine Gael |
| Kerry South | Michael Moynihan | Labour |
| Kerry South | John O'Leary | Fianna Fáil |
| Kildare | Joseph Bermingham | Labour |
| Kildare | Bernard Durkan | Fine Gael |
| Kildare | Alan Dukes | Fine Gael |
| Kildare | Charlie McCreevy | Fianna Fáil |
| Kildare | Paddy Power | Fianna Fáil |
| Laois–Offaly | Ger Connolly | Fianna Fáil |
| Laois–Offaly | Bernard Cowen | Fianna Fáil |
| Laois–Offaly | Tom Enright | Fine Gael |
| Laois–Offaly | Oliver J. Flanagan | Fine Gael |
| Laois–Offaly | Liam Hyland | Fianna Fáil |
| Limerick East | Peadar Clohessy | Fianna Fáil |
| Limerick East | Jim Kemmy | Independent |
| Limerick East | Michael Noonan | Fine Gael |
| Limerick East | Tom O'Donnell | Fine Gael |
| Limerick East | Desmond O'Malley | Fianna Fáil |
| Limerick West | Gerry Collins | Fianna Fáil |
| Limerick West | Michael J. Noonan | Fianna Fáil |
| Limerick West | William O'Brien | Fine Gael |
| Longford–Westmeath | Patrick Cooney | Fine Gael |
| Longford–Westmeath | Seán Keegan | Fianna Fáil |
| Longford–Westmeath | Gerry L'Estrange | Fine Gael |
| Longford–Westmeath | Albert Reynolds | Fianna Fáil |
| Louth | Paddy Agnew | Independent |
| Louth | Pádraig Faulkner | Fianna Fáil |
| Louth | Eddie Filgate | Fianna Fáil |
| Louth | Bernard Markey | Fine Gael |
| Mayo East | Seán Calleary | Fianna Fáil |
| Mayo East | P. J. Morley | Fianna Fáil |
| Mayo East | Paddy O'Toole | Fine Gael |
| Mayo West | Pádraig Flynn | Fianna Fáil |
| Mayo West | Denis Gallagher | Fianna Fáil |
| Mayo West | Enda Kenny | Fine Gael |
| Meath | John Bruton | Fine Gael |
| Meath | Brendan Crinion | Fianna Fáil |
| Meath | John Farrelly | Fine Gael |
| Meath | Jim Fitzsimons | Fianna Fáil |
| Meath | James Tully | Labour |
| Roscommon | John Connor | Fine Gael |
| Roscommon | Seán Doherty | Fianna Fáil |
| Roscommon | Terry Leyden | Fianna Fáil |
| Sligo–Leitrim | John Ellis | Fianna Fáil |
| Sligo–Leitrim | Joe McCartin | Fine Gael |
| Sligo–Leitrim | Ray MacSharry | Fianna Fáil |
| Sligo–Leitrim | Ted Nealon | Fine Gael |
| Tipperary North | David Molony | Fine Gael |
| Tipperary North | John Ryan | Labour |
| Tipperary North | Michael Smith | Fianna Fáil |
| Tipperary South | Carrie Acheson | Fianna Fáil |
| Tipperary South | Brendan Griffin | Fine Gael |
| Tipperary South | Seán McCarthy | Fianna Fáil |
| Tipperary South | Seán Treacy | Labour |
| Waterford | Edward Collins | Fine Gael |
| Waterford | Austin Deasy | Fine Gael |
| Waterford | Jackie Fahey | Fianna Fáil |
| Waterford | Billy Kenneally | Fianna Fáil |
| Wexford | Lorcan Allen | Fianna Fáil |
| Wexford | Hugh Byrne | Fianna Fáil |
| Wexford | Brendan Corish | Labour |
| Wexford | Michael D'Arcy | Fine Gael |
| Wexford | Ivan Yates | Fine Gael |
| Wicklow | Paudge Brennan | Fianna Fáil |
| Wicklow | Liam Kavanagh | Labour |
| Wicklow | Ciarán Murphy | Fianna Fáil |
| Wicklow | Godfrey Timmins | Fine Gael |

== Changes ==
| Date | Constituency | Loss | Gain | Note |
|---|---|---|---|---|
| 30 June 1981 | Dublin South-Central | Independent | Ceann Comhairle | John O'Connell takes office as Ceann Comhairle |
| 2 August 1981 | Cavan–Monaghan | Independent | | Kieran Doherty dies on hunger strike |

On 21 October 1981, a motion to move the writ for the vacancy in Cavan–Monaghan was rejected on a vote of 78 to 80. On 26 January 1982, a second motion in the same terms was defeated on a vote of 78 to 81. The Dáil was dissolved on the following day following the defeat of the budget.
