= 13th Seanad =

Members of the Seanad from 1973 to 1977

| ← | 12th Seanad | 14th Seanad | → |

Overview
- Legislative body: Seanad Éireann
- Jurisdiction: Ireland
- Meeting place: Leinster House
- Term: 1 June 1973 – 16 August 1977
- Government: 14th government of Ireland
- Members: 60
- Cathaoirleach: James Dooge (FG)
- Leas-Chathaoirleach: Evelyn Owens (Lab)
- Leader of the Seanad: Michael O'Higgins (FG)

The 13th Seanad was in office from 1973 to 1977. An election to Seanad Éireann, the senate of the Oireachtas (Irish parliament), followed the 1973 general election to the 20th Dáil. The senators served until the close of poll for the 14th Seanad in 1977.

== Cathaoirleach ==
On 1 June 1973, James Dooge (FG) was proposed for the position of Cathaoirleach by Michael O'Higgins (FG) and seconded by Jack Fitzgerald (FG). He was elected without a division.

On 20 June 1973, Kit Ahern (FF) was proposed for the position of Leas-Chathaoirleach by Brian Lenihan (FF) and seconded by Seán Brosnan (FF). She was defeated by a vote of 18 to 31. Evelyn Owens (Lab) was proposed by Jack Fitzgerald (FG) and seconded by Michael Moynihan (Lab). She was elected by a vote of 30 to 18. Mary Robinson (Ind) supported the election of Ahern, but abstained in the vote on Owens.

== Composition of the 13th Seanad ==
There are a total of 60 seats in the Seanad: 43 were elected on five vocational panels, 6 were elected from two university constituencies and 11 were nominated by the Taoiseach.

The following table shows the composition by party when the 13th Seanad first met on 1 June 1973.

| Origin Party | Vocational panels | | | | | NUI | DU | Nominated | Total |
| Origin Party | Admin | Agri | Cult & Educ | Ind & Comm | Labour | NUI | DU | Nominated | Total |
|---|---|---|---|---|---|---|---|---|---|
| Fianna Fáil | 4 | 5 | 2 | 4 | 3 | 0 | 0 | 0 | 18 |
| Fine Gael | 3 | 5 | 2 | 3 | 4 | 0 | 0 | 7 | 24 |
| Labour Party | 0 | 1 | 1 | 1 | 3 | 1 | 0 | 4 | 11 |
| Independent | 0 | 0 | 0 | 1 | 1 | 2 | 3 | 0 | 7 |
| Total | 7 | 11 | 5 | 9 | 11 | 3 | 3 | 11 | 60 |

== List of senators ==
- Note: The entries for Senators who were elected or appointed to fill vacancies are shown in italics

| Name | Panel | Party | Notes |
|---|---|---|---|
| Seán Brosnan | Administrative Panel | Fianna Fáil | Elected to the 20th Dáil at a by-election on 13 November 1974 |
| Philip Burton | Administrative Panel | Fine Gael | |
| Jack Garrett | Administrative Panel | Fianna Fáil | |
| Seán Keegan | Administrative Panel | Fianna Fáil | |
| Thomas Kilbride | Administrative Panel | Fine Gael | |
| Bernard McGlinchey | Administrative Panel | Fianna Fáil | |
| Andy O'Brien | Administrative Panel | Fine Gael | |
| Micheál Prendergast | Administrative Panel | Fine Gael | Elected to Seanad at a by-election on 23 April 1975, replacing Seán Brosnan |
| Bob Aylward | Agricultural Panel | Fianna Fáil | Died on 18 July 1974 |
| Jack Barrett | Agricultural Panel | Fine Gael | |
| Pierce Butler | Agricultural Panel | Fine Gael | |
| Bernard Cowen | Agricultural Panel | Fianna Fáil | |
| Jack Fitzgerald | Agricultural Panel | Labour | |
| John Mannion | Agricultural Panel | Fine Gael | |
| Joe McCartin | Agricultural Panel | Fine Gael | |
| Patrick McGowan | Agricultural Panel | Fianna Fáil | |
| Cornelius O'Callaghan | Agricultural Panel | Fianna Fáil | Died on 24 January 1974 |
| William Ryan | Agricultural Panel | Fianna Fáil | |
| Liam Whyte | Agricultural Panel | Fine Gael | |
| Pat Codd | Agricultural Panel | Fine Gael | Elected to Seanad at a by-election on 23 April 1975, succeeding Cornelius O'Callaghan |
| Michael Ferris | Agricultural Panel | Labour | Elected to Seanad at a by-election on 23 April 1975, succeeding Bob Aylward |
| Kit Ahern | Cultural and Educational Panel | Fianna Fáil | |
| Billy Fox | Cultural and Educational Panel | Fine Gael | Assassinated on 12 March 1974 |
| Timothy McAuliffe | Cultural and Educational Panel | Labour | |
| Mary Walsh | Cultural and Educational Panel | Fine Gael | Died on 18 August 1976 |
| Michael Yeats | Cultural and Educational Panel | Fianna Fáil | |
| Roddy Connolly | Cultural and Educational Panel | Labour | Elected to Seanad at a by-election 23 April 1975, replacing Billy Fox |
| Vincent McHugh | Cultural and Educational Panel | Fine Gael | Elected to Seanad at a by-election on 25 October 1976, replacing Mary Walsh |
| John J. Brennan | Industrial and Commercial Panel | Fianna Fáil | |
| Fad Browne | Industrial and Commercial Panel | Fianna Fáil | |
| James Dooge | Industrial and Commercial Panel | Fine Gael | Cathaoirleach |
| Denis Farrelly | Industrial and Commercial Panel | Fine Gael | Died on 27 December 1974 |
| Alexis FitzGerald | Industrial and Commercial Panel | Fine Gael | |
| Brian Lenihan | Industrial and Commercial Panel | Fianna Fáil | |
| Michael Moynihan | Industrial and Commercial Panel | Labour | |
| Ted Russell | Industrial and Commercial Panel | Independent | |
| Eoin Ryan | Industrial and Commercial Panel | Fianna Fáil | |
| Jack Daly | Industrial and Commercial Panel | Fine Gael | Elected to Seanad at a by-election on 23 April 1975, replacing Denis Farrelly |
| John Boland | Labour Panel | Fine Gael | |
| Seán Brosnahan | Labour Panel | Independent | |
| Séamus Dolan | Labour Panel | Fianna Fáil | |
| Des Hanafin | Labour Panel | Fianna Fáil | |
| Jack Harte | Labour Panel | Labour | |
| Fintan Kennedy | Labour Panel | Labour | |
| Mark Killilea | Labour Panel | Fianna Fáil | |
| Michael Lyons | Labour Panel | Fine Gael | |
| Bernard Markey | Labour Panel | Fine Gael | |
| William O'Brien | Labour Panel | Fine Gael | |
| Evelyn Owens | Labour Panel | Labour | |
| John Horgan | National University of Ireland | Labour | |
| Augustine Martin | National University of Ireland | Independent | |
| Patrick Quinlan | National University of Ireland | Independent | |
| Noël Browne | Dublin University | Independent | |
| Mary Robinson | Dublin University | Independent | |
| Trevor West | Dublin University | Independent | |
| John Blennerhassett | Nominated by the Taoiseach | Fine Gael | |
| Austin Deasy | Nominated by the Taoiseach | Fine Gael | Elected to the 21st Dáil at the general election on 16 June 1977 |
| Benjamin Guinness | Nominated by the Taoiseach | Fine Gael | |
| Brendan Halligan | Nominated by the Taoiseach | Labour | Elected to the 20th Dáil at a by-election on 10 June 1976 |
| Michael D. Higgins | Nominated by the Taoiseach | Labour | |
| Patrick Kerrigan | Nominated by the Taoiseach | Labour | Elected to the 21st Dáil at the general election on 16 June 1977 |
| Patrick W. McGrath | Nominated by the Taoiseach | Fine Gael | |
| Michael Mullen | Nominated by the Taoiseach | Labour | |
| Michael J. O'Higgins | Nominated by the Taoiseach | Fine Gael | Leader of the Seanad |
| Paddy O'Toole | Nominated by the Taoiseach | Fine Gael | Elected to the 21st Dáil at the general election on 16 June 1977 |
| James Sanfey | Nominated by the Taoiseach | Fine Gael | |
| Ruairi Quinn | Nominated by the Taoiseach | Labour | Nominated on 1 July 1976, replacing Brendan Halligan; Elected to the 21st Dáil at the general election on 16 June 1977 |
| Liam Burke | Nominated by the Taoiseach | Fine Gael | Nominated on 21 June 1977 to fill vacancy |
| Martin Finn | Nominated by the Taoiseach | Fine Gael | Nominated on 21 June 1977 to fill vacancy |
| Frank King | Nominated by the Taoiseach | Labour | Nominated on 22 June 1977 to fill vacancy |

== Changes ==
| Date | Panel | Loss | Gain | Note |
|---|---|---|---|---|
| 24 January 1974 | Agricultural Panel | Fianna Fáil | | Death of Cornelius O'Callaghan |
| 12 March 1974 | Cultural and Educational Panel | Fine Gael | | Death of Billy Fox |
| 18 July 1974 | Agricultural Panel | Fianna Fáil | | Death of Bob Aylward |
| 13 November 1974 | Administrative Panel | Fianna Fáil | | Seán Brosnan elected to the 20th Dáil at a by-election |
| 27 December 1974 | Industrial and Commercial Panel | Fine Gael | | Death of Denis Farrelly |
| 23 April 1975 | Administrative Panel | | Fine Gael | Micheál Prendergast elected at a by-election to replace Seán Brosnan |
| 23 April 1975 | Agricultural Panel | | Fine Gael | Pat Codd elected at a by-election to succeed Cornelius O'Callaghan |
| 23 April 1975 | Agricultural Panel | | Labour | Michael Ferris elected at a by-election to succeed Bob Aylward |
| 23 April 1975 | Cultural and Educational Panel | | Labour | Roddy Connolly elected at a by-election to succeed Billy Fox |
| 23 April 1975 | Industrial and Commercial Panel | | Fine Gael | Jack Daly elected at a by-election to succeed Denis Farrelly |
| 10 June 1976 | Nominated by the Taoiseach | Labour | | Brendan Halligan elected to the 20th Dáil at a by-election |
| 1 July 1976 | Nominated by the Taoiseach | | Labour | Ruairi Quinn nominated to succeed Brendan Halligan |
| 18 August 1976 | Cultural and Educational Panel | Fine Gael | | Death of Mary Walsh |
| 25 October 1976 | Cultural and Educational Panel | | Fine Gael | Vincent McHugh elected at a by-election to succeed Mary Walsh |
| 16 June 1977 | Nominated by the Taoiseach | Fine Gael | | Austin Deasy elected to the 21st Dáil at the 1977 general election |
| 16 June 1977 | Nominated by the Taoiseach | Labour | | Patrick Kerrigan elected to the 21st Dáil at the 1977 general election |
| 16 June 1977 | Nominated by the Taoiseach | Fine Gael | | Paddy O'Toole elected to the 21st Dáil at the 1977 general election |
| 16 June 1977 | Nominated by the Taoiseach | Labour | | Ruairi Quinn elected to the 21st Dáil at the 1977 general election |
| 22 June 1977 | Nominated by the Taoiseach | | Fine Gael | Liam Burke nominated to fill vacancy |
| 22 June 1977 | Nominated by the Taoiseach | | Fine Gael | Martin Finn nominated to fill vacancy |
| 22 June 1977 | Nominated by the Taoiseach | | Labour | Brendan Halligan nominated to fill vacancy |
| 22 June 1977 | Nominated by the Taoiseach | | Labour | Frank King nominated to fill vacancy |
