= Calleary =

Calleary is an Irish surname. Notable people with the surname include:

- Dara Calleary (born 1973), Irish politician
- Phelim Calleary (1895–1974), Irish politician
- Seán Calleary (1931–2018), Irish politician
