= Patrick Morley =

Patrick or Pat Morley may refer to:

- P. J. Morley (1931–2012), Irish Fianna Fáil politician from County Mayo
- Pat Morley (footballer) (born 1965), former Irish footballer
- Pat Morley, former drummer for Soul Asylum (1983–1984)
