= 14th Seanad =

Members of the Seanad from 1977 to 1981

←	13th Seanad	15th Seanad	→

Overview
- Legislative body: Seanad Éireann
- Jurisdiction: Ireland
- Meeting place: Leinster House
- Term: 27 October 1977 – 16 July 1981
- Government: 15th government of Ireland (1977–1979); 16th government of Ireland (1979–1981)
- Members: 60
- Cathaoirleach: Séamus Dolan (FF)
- Leas-Chathaoirleach: Joe McCartin (FG) (1977–1979); Charles McDonald (FG) (1979–1981)
- Leader of the Seanad: Eoin Ryan (FF)

The 14th Seanad was in office from 1977 to 1981. An election to 43 of the 60 seats in Seanad Éireann, the senate of the Oireachtas (Irish parliament) took place in August 1977, following the 1977 general election to the 21st Dáil. The remaining 11 seats were occupied by nominees of Jack Lynch as Taoiseach.

The senators served until the close of poll for the 15th Seanad in 1981.

== Cathaoirleach ==
On 27 October 1977, Séamus Dolan (FF) was proposed as Cathaoirleach by Eoin Ryan (FF) and seconded by Michael Yeats (FF). He was elected without a division.

On 2 November 1977, Joe McCartin (FG) was proposed as Leas-Chathaoirleach by Patrick Cooney (FG) and seconded by Alexis FitzGerald (FG). He was elected without a division. McCartin was elected for Connacht–Ulster at the 1979 European Parliament election. He retained his seat in the Seanad, but resigned as Leas-Chathaoirleach on 12 July 1979. On 18 July 1979, Charles McDonald (FG) was proposed as Leas-Chathaoirleach by Patrick Cooney (FG) and seconded by Michael Howard (FG). He was elected without a division.

== Composition of the 14th Seanad ==
There are a total of 60 seats in the Seanad: 43 were elected on five vocational panels, 6 were elected from two university constituencies and 11 were nominated by the Taoiseach.

Two of the Taoiseach's nominees joined Fianna Fáil before the first sitting of the Seanad.

The following table shows the composition by party when the 14th Seanad first met on 27 October 1977.

Origin Party	Vocational panels					NUI	DU	Nominated	Total
Origin Party	Admin	Agri	Cult & Educ	Ind & Comm	Labour	NUI	DU	Nominated	Total
Fianna Fáil	4	5	2	4	5	0	0	9	29
Fine Gael	3	5	2	4	4	0	0	0	18
Labour Party	0	1	1	1	2	0	1	0	6
Independent	0	0	0	0	0	3	2	2	7
Total	7	11	5	9	11	3	3	11	60

== List of senators ==
- Note: The entries for Senators who were elected or appointed to fill vacancies are shown in italics

Name	Panel	Party	Notes
Liam Burke	Administrative Panel	Fine Gael	Elected to 21st Dáil at a by-election on 6 November 1979
Micheál Cranitch	Administrative Panel	Fianna Fáil	
Jack Garrett	Administrative Panel	Fianna Fáil	Died on 11 September 1977
Tras Honan	Administrative Panel	Fianna Fáil	
Thomas Kilbride	Administrative Panel	Fine Gael	
Michael P. Kitt	Administrative Panel	Fianna Fáil	Elected to the 22nd Dáil at the general election on 11 June 1981
Myles Staunton	Administrative Panel	Fine Gael	
Michael Donnelly	Administrative Panel	Fianna Fáil	Elected to Seanad at a by-election on 7 December 1977, following the death of Jack Garrett
Jim Doolan	Administrative Panel	Fianna Fáil	Elected to Seanad at a by-election in April 1980, following the election of Liam Burke to the Dáil
Pierce Butler	Agricultural Panel	Fine Gael	
Paul Connaughton	Agricultural Panel	Fine Gael	Elected to the 22nd Dáil at the general election on 11 June 1981
John Ellis	Agricultural Panel	Fianna Fáil	Elected to the 22nd Dáil at the general election on 11 June 1981
Justin Keating	Agricultural Panel	Labour	
Rory Kiely	Agricultural Panel	Fianna Fáil	
Gerard Lynch	Agricultural Panel	Fine Gael	
Joe McCartin	Agricultural Panel	Fine Gael	Elected to the 22nd Dáil at the general election on 11 June 1981
Charles McDonald	Agricultural Panel	Fine Gael	
Patrick McGowan	Agricultural Panel	Fianna Fáil	
Martin O'Toole	Agricultural Panel	Fianna Fáil	
William Ryan	Agricultural Panel	Fianna Fáil	
Richard Conroy	Cultural and Educational Panel	Fianna Fáil	
Patrick Cooney	Cultural and Educational Panel	Fine Gael	Elected to the 22nd Dáil at the general election on 11 June 1981
Flor Crowley	Cultural and Educational Panel	Fianna Fáil	Elected to the 22nd Dáil at the general election on 11 June 1981
Timothy McAuliffe	Cultural and Educational Panel	Labour	
David Molony	Cultural and Educational Panel	Fine Gael	Elected to the 22nd Dáil at the general election on 11 June 1981
Ruairí Brugha	Industrial and Commercial Panel	Fianna Fáil	
Alexis FitzGerald	Industrial and Commercial Panel	Fine Gael	
Desmond Governey	Industrial and Commercial Panel	Fine Gael	Elected to the 22nd Dáil at the general election on 11 June 1981
Michael Howard	Industrial and Commercial Panel	Fine Gael	
Liam Hyland	Industrial and Commercial Panel	Fianna Fáil	Elected to the 22nd Dáil at the general election on 11 June 1981
Mick Lanigan	Industrial and Commercial Panel	Fianna Fáil	
Michael Moynihan	Industrial and Commercial Panel	Labour	Elected to the 22nd Dáil at the general election on 11 June 1981
Patrick J. Reynolds	Industrial and Commercial Panel	Fine Gael	
Eoin Ryan	Industrial and Commercial Panel	Fianna Fáil	
John Blennerhassett	Labour Panel	Fine Gael	
Séamus Dolan	Labour Panel	Fianna Fáil	
Joseph Dowling	Labour Panel	Fianna Fáil	
Des Hanafin	Labour Panel	Fianna Fáil	
Jack Harte	Labour Panel	Labour	
Tony Herbert	Labour Panel	Fianna Fáil	
Brian Hillery	Labour Panel	Fianna Fáil	
Fintan Kennedy	Labour Panel	Labour	
Michael Lyons	Labour Panel	Fine Gael	
Bernard Markey	Labour Panel	Fine Gael	Elected to the 22nd Dáil at the general election on 11 June 1981
Andy O'Brien	Labour Panel	Fine Gael	
Gemma Hussey	National University of Ireland	Independent	
Augustine Martin	National University of Ireland	Independent	
John A. Murphy	National University of Ireland	Independent	
Conor Cruise O'Brien	Dublin University	Independent	Resigned from the Seanad on 13 June 1979
Catherine McGuinness	Dublin University	Independent	Elected at a by-election on 11 December 1979, following the resignation of Conor Cruise O'Brien
Mary Robinson	Dublin University	Labour	
Trevor West	Dublin University	Independent	
Séamus Brennan	Nominated by the Taoiseach	Fianna Fáil	Elected to the 22nd Dáil at the general election on 11 June 1981
Séamus de Brún	Nominated by the Taoiseach	Fianna Fáil	
Eileen Cassidy	Nominated by the Taoiseach	Fianna Fáil	
Valerie Goulding	Nominated by the Taoiseach	Fianna Fáil	
Mary Harney	Nominated by the Taoiseach	Fianna Fáil	Elected to the 22nd Dáil at the general election on 11 June 1981
Valentine Jago	Nominated by the Taoiseach	Fianna Fáil	
Gordon Lambert	Nominated by the Taoiseach	Independent	
P. J. Mara	Nominated by the Taoiseach	Fianna Fáil	Nominated on 16 July 1981 to fill vacancy after 1981 general election
Bernard McGlinchey	Nominated by the Taoiseach	Fianna Fáil	
Noel Mulcahy	Nominated by the Taoiseach	Fianna Fáil	
Joseph O'Neill	Nominated by the Taoiseach	Fianna Fáil	Nominated on 16 July 1981 to fill vacancy after 1981 general election
Jim Ruttle	Nominated by the Taoiseach	Fianna Fáil	Nominated on 20 June 1980 to fill vacancy created by the resignation of Michael Yeats
T. K. Whitaker	Nominated by the Taoiseach	Independent	
Michael Yeats	Nominated by the Taoiseach	Fianna Fáil	Resigned from the Seanad on 12 March 1980

== Changes ==
Date	Panel	Loss	Gain	Note
11 September 1977	Administrative Panel	Fianna Fáil		Death of Jack Garrett
7 December 1977	Administrative Panel		Fianna Fáil	Michael Donnelly elected at a by-election after death of Jack Garrett
13 June 1979	Dublin University	Independent		Resignation of Conor Cruise O'Brien due to position as editor of The Observer
6 November 1979	Administrative Panel	Fine Gael		Liam Burke elected to 21st Dáil at a by-election
11 December 1979	Dublin University		Independent	Catherine McGuinness elected at a by-election to replace Conor Cruise O'Brien
12 March 1980	Nominated by the Taoiseach	Fianna Fáil		Resignation of Michael Yeats to take office as Director General of the EEC Council of Ministers
16 April 1980	Administrative Panel		Fianna Fáil	Jim Doolan elected at a by-election to replace Liam Burke
20 June 1980	Nominated by the Taoiseach		Fianna Fáil	Jim Ruttle nominated to repalace Michael Yeats
11 June 1981	Administrative Panel	Fianna Fáil		Michael P. Kitt elected to the 22nd Dáil at the 1981 general election
11 June 1981	Agricultural Panel	Fine Gael		Paul Connaughton elected to the 22nd Dáil at the 1981 general election
11 June 1981	Agricultural Panel	Fianna Fáil		John Ellis elected to the 22nd Dáil at the 1981 general election
11 June 1981	Agricultural Panel	Fine Gael		Joe McCartin elected to the 22nd Dáil at the 1981 general election
11 June 1981	Cultural and Educational Panel	Fine Gael		Patrick Cooney elected to the 22nd Dáil at the 1981 general election
11 June 1981	Cultural and Educational Panel	Fianna Fáil		Flor Crowley elected to the 22nd Dáil at the 1981 general election
11 June 1981	Cultural and Educational Panel	Fine Gael		David Molony elected to the 22nd Dáil at the 1981 general election
11 June 1981	Industrial and Commercial Panel	Fine Gael		Desmond Governey elected to the 22nd Dáil at the 1981 general election
11 June 1981	Industrial and Commercial Panel	Fianna Fáil		Liam Hyland elected to the 22nd Dáil at the 1981 general election
11 June 1981	Industrial and Commercial Panel	Labour		Michael Moynihan elected to the 22nd Dáil at the 1981 general election
11 June 1981	Labour Panel	Fianna Fáil		Séamus Dolan elected to the 22nd Dáil at the 1981 general election
11 June 1981	Labour Panel	Fine Gael		Bernard Markey elected to the 22nd Dáil at the 1981 general election
11 June 1981	Nominated by the Taoiseach	Fianna Fáil		Séamus Brennan elected to the 22nd Dáil at the 1981 general election
11 June 1981	Nominated by the Taoiseach	Fianna Fáil		Mary Harney elected to the 22nd Dáil at the 1981 general election
16 July 1981	Nominated by the Taoiseach		Fianna Fáil	P. J. Mara nominated to fill vacancy after the 1981 general election
16 July 1981	Nominated by the Taoiseach		Fianna Fáil	Joseph O'Neill nominated to fill vacancy after the 1981 general election
16 July 1981	Industrial and Commercial Panel	Fine Gael		Resignation of Alexis FitzGerald on appointment as special advisor to government
