= Joseph O'Neill (politician) =

Irish politician

Senator
- In office 16 July 1981 – 8 October 1981
- Constituency: Nominated by the Taoiseach

Joseph O'Neill was an Irish Fianna Fáil politician who briefly served as a member of the 14th Seanad. He was nominated by the Taoiseach Charles Haughey, on 16 July 1981, to fill a vacancy caused by the election of Mary Harney to Dáil Éireann at the 1981 general election. He did not contest the 1981 Seanad election.
