= Mayo East (Dáil constituency) =

Dáil constituency (1969–1997)

- Former Dáil constituency

Former constituency
- Created: 1969
- Abolished: 1997
- Seats: 3
- Local government area: County Mayo
- Created from: Mayo North; Mayo South
- Replaced by: Mayo

Mayo East was a parliamentary constituency represented in Dáil Éireann, the lower house of the Irish parliament or Oireachtas from 1969 to 1997. The constituency was served by 3 deputies (Teachtaí Dála, commonly known as TDs). The method of election was proportional representation by means of the single transferable vote (PR-STV).

== History and boundaries ==
The constituency was created under the terms of the Electoral (Amendment) Act 1969, taking in parts of the former Mayo North and Mayo South constituencies. It was abolished for the 1997 general election when it was combined with Mayo West to form the new 5 seat Mayo constituency.

== TDs ==
Teachtaí Dála (TDs) for Mayo East 1969–1997
Key to parties: FF = Fianna Fáil; FG = Fine Gael
Dáil	Election	Deputy (Party)	Deputy (Party)	Deputy (Party)
19th	1969	Seán Flanagan (FF)	Thomas O'Hara (FG)	Martin Finn (FG)
20th	1973	Seán Flanagan (FF)	Seán Calleary (FF)	Martin Finn (FG)
21st	1977	P. J. Morley (FF)	Seán Calleary (FF)	Paddy O'Toole (FG)
22nd	1981	P. J. Morley (FF)	Seán Calleary (FF)	Paddy O'Toole (FG)
23rd	1982 (Feb)	P. J. Morley (FF)	Seán Calleary (FF)	Paddy O'Toole (FG)
24th	1982 (Nov)	P. J. Morley (FF)	Seán Calleary (FF)	Paddy O'Toole (FG)
25th	1987	P. J. Morley (FF)	Seán Calleary (FF)	Jim Higgins (FG)
26th	1989	P. J. Morley (FF)	Seán Calleary (FF)	Jim Higgins (FG)
27th	1992	P. J. Morley (FF)	Tom Moffatt (FF)	Jim Higgins (FG)
28th	1997	Constituency abolished. See Mayo		

Note: The columns in this table are used only for presentational purposes, and no significance should be attached to the order of columns. For details of the order in which seats were won at each election, see the detailed results of that election.

== Elections ==
*: Outgoing TD

=== 1992 general election ===
1992 general election: Mayo East
Party	Candidate	FPv%	Count		
Party	Candidate	FPv%	1	2	3
Fine Gael	Jim Higgins	26.1	7,631		
Fianna Fáil	Tom Moffatt	22.7	6,639	6,870	7,709
Fine Gael	Ernie Caffrey	19.6	5,733	6,209	6,457
Fianna Fáil	P. J. Morley	19.4	5,693	5,806	7,158
Fianna Fáil	Paddy Oliver	8.6	2,514	2,612	
Independent	Mary Reilly	3.7	1,089		
Electorate: 43,449 Valid: 29,299 Spoilt: 421 (1.4%) Quota: 7,325 Turnout: 29,720 (68.4%)

=== 1989 general election ===
1989 general election: Mayo East
Party	Candidate	FPv%	Count	
Party	Candidate	FPv%	1	2
Fine Gael	Jim Higgins	31.2	8,463	
Fianna Fáil	Seán Calleary	27.0	7,313	
Fianna Fáil	P. J. Morley	24.3	6,579	6,967
Fine Gael	Ernie Caffrey	17.6	4,758	6,054
Electorate: 39,470 Valid: 27,113 Quota: 6,779 Turnout: 68.7%

=== 1987 general election ===
1987 general election: Mayo East
Party	Candidate	FPv%	Count		
Party	Candidate	FPv%	1	2	3
Fine Gael	Jim Higgins	23.5	7,263	7,328	7,829
Fianna Fáil	Seán Calleary	21.9	6,779	6,955	8,560
Fianna Fáil	P. J. Morley	20.6	6,382	6,497	8,295
Fine Gael	Paddy O'Toole	18.6	5,765	5,833	6,058
Fianna Fáil	Padraic Gavin	13.1	4,063	4,203	
Sinn Féin	Joseph McHale	2.2	668		
Electorate: 41,247 Valid: 30,920 Quota: 7,731 Turnout: 75.0%

=== November 1982 general election ===
November 1982 general election: Mayo East
Party	Candidate	FPv%	Count			
Party	Candidate	FPv%	1	2	3	4
Fianna Fáil	Seán Calleary	21.7	6,834	6,944	8,815	
Fianna Fáil	P. J. Morley	20.7	6,507	6,717	8,091	
Fine Gael	Paddy O'Toole	20.4	6,427	7,594	7,777	7,997
Fine Gael	Jim Higgins	16.3	5,120	6,539	6,695	6,969
Fianna Fáil	John Bolingbrook	10.9	3,418	3,659		
Fine Gael	Seán McEvoy	8.7	2,745			
Independent	John Regan	1.4	451			
Electorate: 41,818 Valid: 31,502 Quota: 7,876 Turnout: 75.3%

=== February 1982 general election ===
February 1982 general election: Mayo East
Party	Candidate	FPv%	Count		
Party	Candidate	FPv%	1	2	3
Fine Gael	Paddy O'Toole	22.9	7,140	7,512	7,770
Fianna Fáil	P. J. Morley	22.8	7,096	7,194	8,504
Fianna Fáil	Seán Calleary	22.1	6,876	6,927	8,672
Fine Gael	Jim Higgins	16.5	5,134	5,937	6,092
Fianna Fáil	John Bolingbrook	11.1	3,439	3,509	
Fine Gael	John Flannery	4.1	1,274		
Independent	Peter Keane	0.4	134		
Electorate: 41,811 Valid: 31,093 Spoilt: 208 (0.7%) Quota: 7,774 Turnout: 31,509 (75.4%)

=== 1981 general election ===
1981 general election: Mayo East
Party	Candidate	FPv%	Count			
Party	Candidate	FPv%	1	2	3	4
Fianna Fáil	Seán Calleary	22.4	7,248	8,916		
Fianna Fáil	P. J. Morley	21.1	6,829	7,896	8,592	
Fine Gael	Paddy O'Toole	20.3	6,569	6,695	6,719	8,022
Fine Gael	Martin Finn	13.9	4,509	4,798	4,873	7,371
Fine Gael	Jim Higgins	11.8	3,829	3,987	4,020	
Fianna Fáil	John Bolingbrook	10.4	3,367			
Electorate: 41,811 Valid: 32,351 Spoilt: 260 (0.8%) Quota: 8,088 Turnout: 32,611 (78.0%)

=== 1977 general election ===
1977 general election: Mayo East
Party	Candidate	FPv%	Count				
Party	Candidate	FPv%	1	2	3	4	5
Fianna Fáil	Seán Calleary	23.9	7,858	8,074	9,749		
Fine Gael	Paddy O'Toole	19.3	6,338	7,921	8,015	8,053	8,096
Fine Gael	Martin Finn	18.8	6,203	7,694	7,932	7,969	8,033
Fianna Fáil	P. J. Morley	15.6	5,115	5,251	7,007	8,460	
Fianna Fáil	Seán Flanagan	11.3	3,722	3,859			
Fine Gael	Seán McEvoy	11.1	3,646				
Electorate: 44,214 Valid: 32,882 Spoilt: 267 (0.8%) Quota: 8,221 Turnout: 33,149 (75.5%)

=== 1973 general election ===
1973 general election: Mayo East
Party	Candidate	FPv%	Count					
Party	Candidate	FPv%	1	2	3	4	5	6
Fianna Fáil	Seán Calleary	26.0	6,725					
Fine Gael	Martin Finn	22.6	5,842	6,453	6,463	6,785		
Fine Gael	Thomas O'Hara	13.6	3,507	3,828	3,854	5,471	5,718	6,080
Fianna Fáil	Seán Flanagan	12.7	3,290	3,396	3,568	3,600	3,611	6,172
Fianna Fáil	P. J. Morley	12.4	3,218	3,348	3,384	3,407	3,413	
Fine Gael	Paddy O'Toole	7.2	1,850	2,057	2,071			
Labour	Thomas Dillon-Leetch	5.5	1,432					
Electorate: 34,810 Valid: 25,864 Quota: 6,467 Turnout: 74.3%

=== 1969 general election ===
1969 general election: Mayo East
Party	Candidate	FPv%	Count					
Party	Candidate	FPv%	1	2	3	4	5	6
Fianna Fáil	Seán Flanagan	23.6	6,165	6,239	6,979			
Fine Gael	Martin Finn	18.6	4,852	5,078	5,111	5,116	5,913	6,442
Fianna Fáil	John Garrett	15.6	4,087	4,145	5,138	5,538	6,061	6,115
Fine Gael	Thomas O'Hara	15.6	4,080	4,225	4,523	4,554	7,115	
Fine Gael	Michael Browne	14.5	3,780	4,013	4,132	4,143		
Fianna Fáil	Kevin McLoughlin	8.8	2,292	2,331				
Labour	Gerald Boyle	3.3	869					
Electorate: 35,508 Valid: 26,125 Quota: 6,532 Turnout: 73.6%

== See also ==
- Dáil constituencies
- Politics of the Republic of Ireland
- Historic Dáil constituencies
- Elections in the Republic of Ireland
