= Jim Doolan =

Irish politician and academic (died 2025)

Senator
- In office 16 April 1980 – 8 October 1981
- Constituency: Administrative Panel

Personal details
- Born: 1929 or 1930 County Cork, Ireland
- Died: 11 September 2025 (aged 95) County Galway, Ireland
- Party: Fianna Fáil
- Spouse: Caroline Lane (m. 1994)
- Education: University College Galway; Harvard Business School

James Augustine Doolan (c.1929–1930 – 11 September 2025) was an Irish Fianna Fáil politician and academic.

== Politics ==
He was a member of Seanad Éireann from 1980 to 1981. He was elected to the Administrative Panel of the 14th Seanad at a by-election in April 1980, following the election of Liam Burke to the Dáil. He was not re-elected at the 1981 Seanad election.

He was an unsuccessful Fianna Fáil candidate for the Connacht–Ulster constituency at the 1979 European Parliament election. He was an unsuccessful candidate at the 1993 and 1997 Seanad elections.

== Personal life and death ==
Born in County Cork, the family moved to Dublin, when he was young. He was educated at St Mary's College, Dublin. He graduated from University College Galway with a degree in English and French in 1951, and went on to qualify as a chartered accountant in 1954. In 1959, he became the first student from Ireland to receive an MBA from Harvard Business School.

He became a lecturer in commerce at University College Dublin in 1962. Later returning to the U.S., he taught at Harvard Business School before returning to Ireland in 1971 to take up an appointment as professor of business studies at University College Galway. He helped set up its first MBA course. His sister Mary, married George Colley, a Fianna Fáil minister.

Doolan died on 11 September 2025, at the age of 95.
