= Frank King (Irish politician) =

Irish politician

Senator
- In office 22 June 1977 – 27 October 1977
- Constituency: Nominated by the Taoiseach

Personal details
- Party: Labour Party

Frank King was an Irish Labour Party politician who briefly served as a member of the 13th Seanad. He was nominated by the Taoiseach Liam Cosgrave, on 22 June 1977, to fill a vacancy caused by the election of Patrick Kerrigan to Dáil Éireann at the 1977 general election. He did not contest the 1977 Seanad election.

He was an unsuccessful Labour Party candidate for the Waterford constituency at the 1977 general election.
