= Mary Walsh (politician) =

Irish politician (1929–1976)

Senator
- In office 1 June 1973 – 18 August 1976
- Constituency: Cultural and Educational Panel

Personal details
- Born: October 1929 County Wicklow, Ireland
- Died: 18 August 1976 (aged 46)
- Party: Fine Gael

Mary Walsh (October 1929 – 18 August 1976) was an Irish Fine Gael politician and publican. She stood unsuccessfully as a Fine Gael candidate at the 1973 general election for the Wicklow constituency.

She was elected to Seanad Éireann on the Cultural and Educational Panel at the 1973 Seanad election. She died in 1976 during the 13th Seanad and Vincent McHugh was elected at the subsequent by-election.
