= Vincent McHugh =

Irish politician (died 1977)

Senator
- In office 25 October 1976 – 27 October 1977
- Constituency: Cultural and Educational Panel
- In office 23 June 1965 – 5 November 1969
- In office 14 August 1951 – 22 July 1954
- Constituency: Labour Panel

Personal details
- Born: County Clare, Ireland
- Died: 1977
- Party: Fine Gael

Vincent McHugh (died 1977) was an Irish Fine Gael politician. He was a member of Seanad Éireann on three occasions; from 1951 to 1954, 1965 to 1969 and 1976 to 1977. He was elected to the 7th Seanad in 1951 by the Labour Panel, but lost his seat at the 1954 Seanad election.

He was next elected to the 11th Seanad in 1965 again by the Labour Panel, and lost his seat at the 1969 Seanad election. He was last elected at a by-election to the 13th Seanad in October 1976 by the Cultural and Educational Panel, following the death of Mary Walsh. He did not contest the 1977 Seanad election.

He stood unsuccessfully for Dáil Éireann as a Fine Gael candidate for the Clare constituency at the 1951 and 1954 general elections.
