= 1970 Longford–Westmeath by-election =

By-election to the 19th Dáil

- 14 April 1970
- Turnout: 34,554 (75.2%)
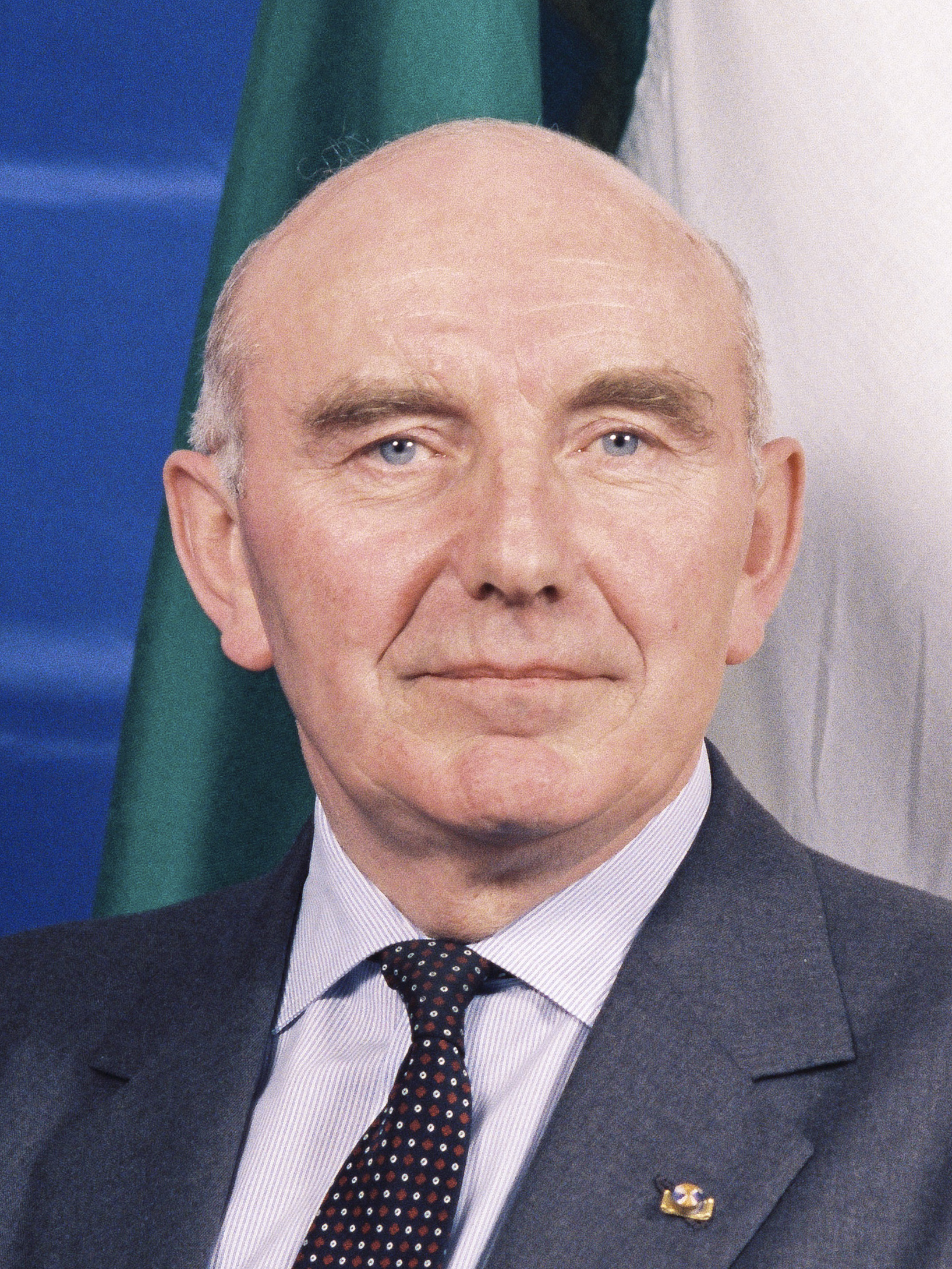
		Keegan	Coleman
Nominee	Patrick Cooney	Seán Keegan	Jack Coleman
Party	Fine Gael	Fianna Fáil	Labour
First preferences	16,146	15,228	3,180
Percentage	46.7%	44.1%	9.2%
Final count	18,252	15,904	–
TD before election
Patrick Lenihan
Fianna Fáil
TD after election
Patrick Cooney
Fine Gael

A Dáil by-election was held in the constituency of Longford–Westmeath in Ireland on Tuesday, 14 April 1970, to fill a vacancy in the 19th Dáil. It followed the death of Fianna Fáil Teachta Dála (TD) Patrick Lenihan on 11 March 1970.

The writ of election to fill the vacancy was agreed by the Dáil on 18 March 1970.

The by-election was won by the Fine Gael candidate Patrick Cooney. It was held on the same day as the 1970 Kildare by-election. Both by-elections were won by Fine Gael candidates.

== Result ==
1970 Longford–Westmeath by-election
Party	Candidate	FPv%	Count	
Party	Candidate	FPv%	1	2
Fine Gael	Patrick Cooney	46.7	16,146	18,252
Fianna Fáil	Seán Keegan	44.1	15,228	15,904
Labour	Jack Coleman	9.2	3,180	
Electorate: 45,956 Valid: 34,554 Quota: 17,278 Turnout: 75.2%
