= Cornelius O'Callaghan (Fianna Fáil politician) =

Irish politician (1922–1974)

Senator
- In office 24 February 1970 – 24 January 1974
- Constituency: Agricultural Panel

Personal details
- Born: 1922 County Cork, Ireland
- Died: 24 January 1974 (aged 51–52) County Cork, Ireland
- Party: Fianna Fáil

Cornelius Kevin O'Callaghan (1922 – 24 January 1974) was an Irish Fianna Fáil politician. He stood for election to Dáil Éireann as a Fianna Fáil candidate for the Cork North constituency at the 1951 general election but was unsuccessful.

He was elected to Seanad Éireann to the Agricultural Panel at a by-election on 24 February 1970. He was re-elected at the 1973 Seanad election. He died in 1974 during the 13th Seanad.
