= Noel Mulcahy =

Irish academic and politician (1929–2019)

Senator
- In office 27 October 1977 – 8 October 1981
- Constituency: Nominated by the Taoiseach

Personal details
- Born: 1929
- Died: 28 February 2019 (aged 89) Dublin, Ireland
- Party: Fianna Fáil
- Spouse: Caroline Mulcahy
- Children: 4

Noel William Mulcahy (1929 – 28 February 2019) was an Irish Fianna Fáil politician. He was a member of Seanad Éireann from 1977 to 1981. He was an unsuccessful Fianna Fáil candidate for the Dublin North-Central constituency at the 1977 general election. He was nominated by the Taoiseach to the 14th Seanad in 1977. He did not contest the 1981 Seanad election.

He was vice-president of the National Institute of Higher Education, Limerick, as well as serving as the institute's dean of Engineering and Science in the 1980s.

Mulcahy died on 28 February 2019, aged 89.
