= Martin Finn =

Irish politician (1917–1988)

Senator
- In office 21 June 1977 – 27 October 1977
- Constituency: Nominated by the Taoiseach

Teachta Dála
- In office June 1969 – June 1977
- Constituency: Mayo East

Personal details
- Born: 22 August 1917 County Mayo, Ireland
- Died: 17 March 1988 (aged 70) County Mayo, Ireland
- Party: Fine Gael

Martin Finn (22 August 1917 – 7 March 1988) was an Irish Fine Gael politician, farmer and auctioneer. He was elected to Dáil Éireann for the Mayo East constituency at the 1969 general election and was re-elected at the 1973 general election.

He lost his seat at the 1977 general election but was nominated by the Taoiseach Liam Cosgrave to the 13th Seanad.

Dáil	Election	Deputy (Party)	Deputy (Party)	Deputy (Party)
19th	1969	Seán Flanagan (FF)	Thomas O'Hara (FG)	Martin Finn (FG)
20th	1973	Seán Flanagan (FF)	Seán Calleary (FF)	Martin Finn (FG)
21st	1977	P. J. Morley (FF)	Seán Calleary (FF)	Paddy O'Toole (FG)
22nd	1981	P. J. Morley (FF)	Seán Calleary (FF)	Paddy O'Toole (FG)
23rd	1982 (Feb)	P. J. Morley (FF)	Seán Calleary (FF)	Paddy O'Toole (FG)
24th	1982 (Nov)	P. J. Morley (FF)	Seán Calleary (FF)	Paddy O'Toole (FG)
25th	1987	P. J. Morley (FF)	Seán Calleary (FF)	Jim Higgins (FG)
26th	1989	P. J. Morley (FF)	Seán Calleary (FF)	Jim Higgins (FG)
27th	1992	P. J. Morley (FF)	Tom Moffatt (FF)	Jim Higgins (FG)
28th	1997	Constituency abolished. See Mayo		
