= Brendan Halligan =

Irish politician (1936–2020)

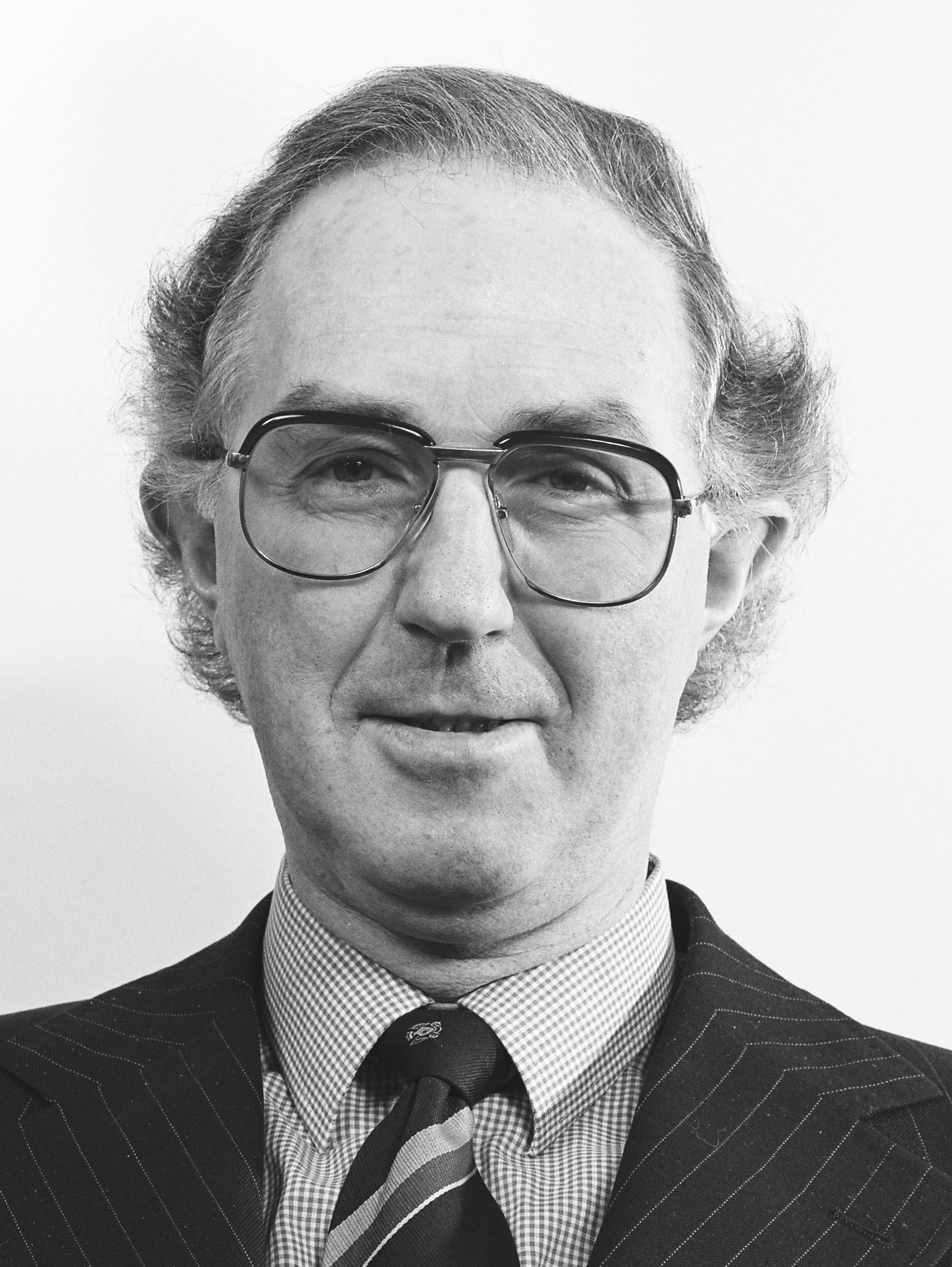
- Halligan, c. 1983

Member of the European Parliament
- In office March 1983 – June 1984
- Constituency: Dublin

Teachta Dála
- In office June 1976 – June 1977
- Constituency: Dublin South-West

Senator
- In office 1 June 1973 – 10 June 1976
- Constituency: Nominated by the Taoiseach

Personal details
- Born: 5 July 1936 Rialto, Dublin, Ireland
- Died: 9 August 2020 (aged 84) Dublin, Ireland
- Party: Labour Party
- Website: Official website

Brendan Halligan (5 July 1936 – 9 August 2020) was an Irish economist and politician. He was founder and president of the Institute of International and European Affairs (IIEA), a think tank on European and international issues. He was president of the Ireland China Institute, an independent think tank based in Dublin, Ireland, which was officially launched in October 2019. His career spanned Irish public sector bodies and work in the private sector. At various times he was General Secretary of the Labour Party, a Teachta Dála (TD), a Senator, and a Member of the European Parliament (MEP).

== Early life and education ==
Halligan was born in Dublin in 1936. He grew up in Rialto and was educated at St James's Christian Brothers School, Dublin. He studied in Dublin Institute of Technology and became a chemical analyst in the CIÉ depot in Inchicore. He and three friends decided to go to university and formed a co-operative and worked at various jobs in London to fund their studies. In 1959, he began an economics and law degree at University College Dublin. There he was influenced by lecturers including George O’Brien, Patrick Lynch and Garret FitzGerald. He received a master's degree in economics from UCD in 1964.

== Career ==
Following an early career as an economist, working with the Irish Sugar Company until 1967, he became involved in politics. In that year, he became General Secretary of the Labour Party.

The party leader, Brendan Corish, relied on Halligan's intellectual and political skills in his new role. Under Halligan, the party underwent an energetic reorganisation. New structures and policies were put in place, coinciding with the party's leftward policy shift and an acute anti-coalition stance. He strongly supported both approaches, but was instrumental in securing the party's eventual, somewhat unwilling, reversal of its anti-coalition stance after its disappointing result in the 1969 general election. The 1973 general election resulted in a Fine Gael-Labour Party coalition government coming to power.

Halligan was appointed to Seanad Éireann in 1973; three years later, he won a by-election in Dublin South-West, and thus became a TD. After boundary changes, he stood in the new Dublin Finglas at the 1977 general election, but was not elected. Halligan stood again in the revived Dublin North-West constituency at the 1981 and November 1982 general elections, but again was not elected.

He continued to serve as General Secretary of the party until 1980, and was appointed a Member of the European Parliament (MEP) from 1983 until 1984, replacing Frank Cluskey, where he specialised in economic affairs and energy policy.

In 1980, Halligan set up CIPA, his own public affairs consultancy based in Dublin, and became a lecturer in economics at the University of Limerick. He was also chairman of European Movement Ireland during the late 1980s. In 1985, he was appointed as Chairman of Bórd na Móna, the Irish Peat Development Authority, a position he held for ten years. In 1989 he founded the Institute of European Affairs (IEA), which later became the IIEA. He was Director of CIPA until 2014.

Resulting from his keen interest and experience in energy policy and renewable energy, Halligan served as Chair of the Sustainable Energy Authority of Ireland from 2007 until 2014. He was President of the IIEA, and he was also a board member of Mainstream Renewable Energy.

In later years he also worked on the foundation and development of the Ireland China Institute (ICI), which, with its maxim bridging the gap between knowledge and understanding, seeks to strengthen Irish-Chinese diplomatic relations, developing cultural links and fostering a deeper understanding of the respective cultural norms and values between the two nations. He was also President of ICI.

== Death ==
Halligan died on 9 August 2020 after a long illness. On his death, Taoiseach Micheál Martin described him as “a man who gave his life to politics and the public service with a deep commitment to the institutions of the state”. European Commissioner for Trade Phil Hogan stated that “Brendan was a committed European to his fingertips. He was a pragmatic European intellectual, in the tradition of Spinelli, Monnet and Schuman.”.

== Honours and awards ==
- Chevalier de Légion d’Honneur (France, 2016)
- Honorary Doctorate of Literature, (University College Dublin, 2010)

== Selected publications ==
- Brendan, Halligan (2013). Strategies for a Small State in a Large Union (PDF). Institute for International and European Affairs.
- Halligan, Brendan (2014). Our Worst Preference: Reforming the Electoral System. Scáthán Press. ISBN 978-0-9927948-0-4.
- Halligan, Brendan (2015). The Achievement of Socialism. Scáthán Press. ISBN 978-0-9927948-6-6.
- Halligan, Brendan (2015). Wonder Wisdom and War: Essays on Early Ireland. Scáthán Press. ISBN 978-0-9927948-2-8.

Dáil	Election	Deputy (Party)	Deputy (Party)	Deputy (Party)	Deputy (Party)	Deputy (Party)
13th	1948	Seán MacBride (CnaP)	Peadar Doyle (FG)	Bernard Butler (FF)	Michael O'Higgins (FG)	Robert Briscoe (FF)
14th	1951	Seán MacBride (CnaP)	Peadar Doyle (FG)	Bernard Butler (FF)	Michael ffrench-O'Carroll (Ind.)	Robert Briscoe (FF)
15th	1954	Seán MacBride (CnaP)	Peadar Doyle (FG)	Bernard Butler (FF)	Michael O'Higgins (FG)	Robert Briscoe (FF)
15th	1956 by-election	Seán MacBride (CnaP)	Noel Lemass (FF)	Bernard Butler (FF)	Michael O'Higgins (FG)	Robert Briscoe (FF)
16th	1957	James Carroll (Ind.)	Noel Lemass (FF)	Bernard Butler (FF)	Michael O'Higgins (FG)	Robert Briscoe (FF)
16th	1959 by-election	James Carroll (Ind.)	Noel Lemass (FF)	Richie Ryan (FG)	Michael O'Higgins (FG)	Robert Briscoe (FF)
17th	1961	James Carroll (Ind.)	Noel Lemass (FF)	Richie Ryan (FG)	James O'Keeffe (FG)	Robert Briscoe (FF)
18th	1965	John O'Connell (Lab)	Noel Lemass (FF)	Richie Ryan (FG)	Joseph Dowling (FF)	Ben Briscoe (FF)
19th	1969	John O'Connell (Lab)	Noel Lemass (FF)	Seán Dunne (Lab)	Joseph Dowling (FF)	4 seats 1969–1977
19th	1970 by-election	John O'Connell (Lab)	Noel Lemass (FF)	Seán Sherwin (FF)	Joseph Dowling (FF)	4 seats 1969–1977
20th	1973	John O'Connell (Lab)	Noel Lemass (FF)	Declan Costello (FG)	Joseph Dowling (FF)	4 seats 1969–1977
20th	1976 by-election	John O'Connell (Lab)	Brendan Halligan (Lab)	Declan Costello (FG)	Joseph Dowling (FF)	4 seats 1969–1977
21st	1977	Constituency abolished. See Dublin Ballyfermot				

Dáil	Election	Deputy (Party)	Deputy (Party)	Deputy (Party)	Deputy (Party)	Deputy (Party)
22nd	1981	Seán Walsh (FF)	Larry McMahon (FG)	Mary Harney (FF)	Mervyn Taylor (Lab)	4 seats 1981–1992
23rd	1982 (Feb)	Seán Walsh (FF)	Larry McMahon (FG)	Mary Harney (FF)	Mervyn Taylor (Lab)	4 seats 1981–1992
24th	1982 (Nov)	Seán Walsh (FF)	Michael O'Leary (FG)	Mary Harney (FF)	Mervyn Taylor (Lab)	4 seats 1981–1992
25th	1987	Seán Walsh (FF)	Chris Flood (FF)	Mary Harney (PDs)	Mervyn Taylor (Lab)	4 seats 1981–1992
26th	1989	Pat Rabbitte (WP)	Chris Flood (FF)	Mary Harney (PDs)	Mervyn Taylor (Lab)	4 seats 1981–1992
27th	1992	Pat Rabbitte (DL)	Chris Flood (FF)	Mary Harney (PDs)	Mervyn Taylor (Lab)	Éamonn Walsh (Lab)
28th	1997	Pat Rabbitte (DL)	Chris Flood (FF)	Mary Harney (PDs)	Conor Lenihan (FF)	Brian Hayes (FG)
29th	2002	Pat Rabbitte (Lab)	Charlie O'Connor (FF)	Seán Crowe (SF)	Conor Lenihan (FF)	4 seats 2002–2016
30th	2007	Pat Rabbitte (Lab)	Charlie O'Connor (FF)	Brian Hayes (FG)	Conor Lenihan (FF)	4 seats 2002–2016
31st	2011	Pat Rabbitte (Lab)	Eamonn Maloney (Lab)	Brian Hayes (FG)	Seán Crowe (SF)	4 seats 2002–2016
31st	2014 by-election	Pat Rabbitte (Lab)	Eamonn Maloney (Lab)	Paul Murphy (AAA)	Seán Crowe (SF)	4 seats 2002–2016
32nd	2016	Colm Brophy (FG)	John Lahart (FF)	Paul Murphy (AAA–PBP)	Seán Crowe (SF)	Katherine Zappone (Ind.)
33rd	2020	Colm Brophy (FG)	John Lahart (FF)	Paul Murphy (S–PBP)	Seán Crowe (SF)	Francis Noel Duffy (GP)
34th	2024	Colm Brophy (FG)	John Lahart (FF)	Paul Murphy (PBP–S)	Seán Crowe (SF)	Ciarán Ahern (Lab)
