= Jack Garrett =

Irish politician (1914–1977)

Senator
- In office 5 November 1969 – 11 September 1977
- Constituency: Administrative Panel

Personal details
- Born: 22 May 1914
- Died: 11 September 1977 (aged 63)
- Party: Fianna Fáil

Jack Garrett (22 May 1914 – 11 September 1977) was an Irish Fianna Fáil politician, who was a member of Seanad Éireann from 1969 to 1977. A public works contractor, he was elected to the Seanad in 1969 by the Administrative Panel. He was re-elected at the 1973 and 1977 elections. He died on 11 September 1977 before the 14th Seanad had first met. The by-election caused by his death was held on 7 December 1977 and was won by the Fianna Fáil candidate Michael Donnelly.
