= Paddy O'Toole =

Irish politician (1938–2025)

Minister for Tourism, Fisheries and Forestry
- In office 20 January 1987 – 10 March 1987
- Taoiseach: Garret FitzGerald
- Preceded by: Liam Kavanagh
- Succeeded by: Brendan Daly
- Constituency: Mayo East

Minister for Defence
- In office 14 February 1986 – 10 March 1987
- Taoiseach: Garret FitzGerald
- Preceded by: Patrick Cooney
- Succeeded by: Michael J. Noonan

Minister for Fisheries and Forestry
- In office 14 December 1982 – 14 February 1986
- Taoiseach: Garret FitzGerald
- Preceded by: Brendan Daly
- Succeeded by: Liam Kavanagh

Minister for the Gaeltacht
- In office 14 December 1982 – 10 March 1987
- Taoiseach: Garret FitzGerald
- Preceded by: Denis Gallagher
- Succeeded by: Charles Haughey
- In office 30 June 1981 – 9 March 1982
- Taoiseach: Garret FitzGerald
- Preceded by: Máire Geoghegan-Quinn
- Succeeded by: Pádraig Flynn

Teachta Dála
- In office June 1977 – February 1987

Senator
- In office 20 February 1987 – 25 April 1987
- In office 1 June 1973 – 16 June 1977
- Constituency: Nominated by the Taoiseach

Personal details
- Born: 15 January 1938 County Mayo, Ireland
- Died: 11 May 2025 (aged 87) County Mayo, Ireland
- Political party: Fine Gael
- Spouse: Jacqueline O'Toole
- Children: 4

Patrick O'Toole (15 January 1938 – 11 May 2025) was an Irish Fine Gael politician.

O'Toole was nominated by the Taoiseach Liam Cosgrave to the 13th Seanad in 1973. He was elected to Dáil Éireann on his second attempt at the 1977 general election as a Fine Gael Teachta Dála for Mayo East. O'Toole was one of just a handful of new Fine Gael TDs in the biggest landslide election victory for Fianna Fáil.

He served in both cabinets of Garret FitzGerald in the 1980s, as Minister for the Gaeltacht (1981–1982, 1982–1987), Minister for Tourism, Fisheries and Forestry (1982–1986, 1987) and Minister for Defence (1986–1987). He retained his Dáil seat at each general election until losing it at the 1987 general election. He was nominated to the 17th Seanad to fill a vacancy after the general election. He then retired from politics.

O'Toole died on 11 May 2025, at the age of 87.

Political offices
Preceded by Máire Geoghegan-Quinn	Minister for the Gaeltacht; 1981–1982	Succeeded by Pádraig Flynn
Preceded by Denis Gallagher	Minister for the Gaeltacht; 1982–1987	Succeeded by Charles Haughey
Preceded by Brendan Daly	Minister for Fisheries and Forestry; 1982–1986	Succeeded by Liam Kavanagh
Preceded by Patrick Cooney	Minister for Defence; 1986–1987	Succeeded by Michael J. Noonan
Preceded by Liam Kavanagh	Minister for Tourism, Fisheries and Forestry; 1987	Succeeded by Brendan Daly

Dáil	Election	Deputy (Party)	Deputy (Party)	Deputy (Party)
19th	1969	Seán Flanagan (FF)	Thomas O'Hara (FG)	Martin Finn (FG)
20th	1973	Seán Flanagan (FF)	Seán Calleary (FF)	Martin Finn (FG)
21st	1977	P. J. Morley (FF)	Seán Calleary (FF)	Paddy O'Toole (FG)
22nd	1981	P. J. Morley (FF)	Seán Calleary (FF)	Paddy O'Toole (FG)
23rd	1982 (Feb)	P. J. Morley (FF)	Seán Calleary (FF)	Paddy O'Toole (FG)
24th	1982 (Nov)	P. J. Morley (FF)	Seán Calleary (FF)	Paddy O'Toole (FG)
25th	1987	P. J. Morley (FF)	Seán Calleary (FF)	Jim Higgins (FG)
26th	1989	P. J. Morley (FF)	Seán Calleary (FF)	Jim Higgins (FG)
27th	1992	P. J. Morley (FF)	Tom Moffatt (FF)	Jim Higgins (FG)
28th	1997	Constituency abolished. See Mayo		
