= Vincent Brady =

Irish politician (1936–2020)

Minister for Defence
- In office 14 November 1991 – 11 February 1992
- Taoiseach: Charles Haughey
- Preceded by: Brendan Daly
- Succeeded by: John Wilson

Minister of State
- 1991: Finance
- 1987–1991: Government Chief Whip
- 1987–1991: Defence

Teachta Dála
- In office June 1977 – November 1992
- Constituency: Dublin North-Central

Personal details
- Born: 14 March 1936 Dublin, Ireland
- Died: 6 October 2020 (aged 84) Dublin, Ireland
- Party: Fianna Fáil
- Spouse: Mary Neville
- Children: 3
- Education: Dublin Institute of Technology

Vincent Brady (14 March 1936 – 6 October 2020) was an Irish Fianna Fáil politician. He served under Taoiseach Charles Haughey as Government Chief Whip (1987–1991) and Minister for Defence (1991–1992).

== Early life ==
Brady was born in Dublin on 14 March 1936. His parents, Tom and Nellie Gilroy, were a young couple from County Cavan. As they were not married at the time, they placed Vincent in foster care. He was fostered by Margaret Bourke, a widow from County Kilkenny, and her two sisters. They lived on Tolka Road in Ballybough. Until 1998, Brady was unaware that he had six younger siblings. He met his birth family at the age of 62. He was educated at St Canice's CBS and O'Connell School in Dublin, before studying accounting and business at the College of Commerce in Rathmines. Before embarking on a career in politics, he was a director of a company engaged in machinery distribution, which he had founded in 1970.

== Political career ==
Brady was elected to Dáil Éireann at his first attempt, in the 1977 general election for the Dublin North-Central constituency. Two years later he became involved in local politics, when he was elected to Dublin City Council.

When in 1979 Fianna Fáil faced its first leadership election since 1966, Brady backed his constituency colleague Charles Haughey against the only other contender, George Colley. Haughey won, and Brady continued to back him during the three attempts in the early 1980s to displace Haughey from the party leadership.

During the early 1980s, Brady was a member of the Council of Europe. In 1984 he joined the front bench of the party as Chief Whip. He was re-elected to Dublin City Council in 1985, having topped the poll in Dublin Clontarf and received the highest vote in the country. When Fianna Fáil returned to government in 1987, Brady was appointed Minister of State at the Department of the Taoiseach and Defence, the Government Chief Whip. He served in that position until November 1991, when he joined the cabinet as Minister for Defence. He remained in that position until February 1992, when Albert Reynolds became Taoiseach and sacked Brady, along with many other senior ministers who had served under Haughey. Brady retired from politics at the 1992 general election. After his retirement from politics, he concentrated on continuing the development of his distribution business.

== Personal life ==
Brady married Mary Neville, known as Mollie, and they had three children. Vincent and Mollie were later estranged. He began a relationship with Dymphna O’Moore who was his partner until his death on 6 October 2020. Brady's estate was valued at €31,191,408. He bequeathed property and shares to Mollie, Dymphna, his children, and his grandchildren. He left €10,000 to his foster siblings. He also left €5,000 to the Society of Saint Vincent de Paul with an “express wish” that the money be used in Marino, Dublin, “insofar as possible”.

Political offices
Preceded by Fergus O'Brien	Government Chief Whip; 1987–1991	Succeeded by Dermot Ahern
Preceded by Fergus O'Brien	Minister of State at the Department of Defence; 1987–1991	Succeeded by Dermot Ahern
Preceded by Brendan Daly	Minister of State at the Department of Finance; Feb–Nov 1991	Succeeded by John O'Donoghue
Preceded by Brendan Daly	Minister for Defence; 1991–1992	Succeeded by John Wilson

Dáil	Election	Deputy (Party)	Deputy (Party)	Deputy (Party)	Deputy (Party)
13th	1948	Vivion de Valera (FF)	Martin O'Sullivan (Lab)	Patrick McGilligan (FG)	3 seats 1948–1961
14th	1951	Vivion de Valera (FF)	Colm Gallagher (FF)	Patrick McGilligan (FG)	3 seats 1948–1961
15th	1954	Vivion de Valera (FF)	Maureen O'Carroll (Lab)	Patrick McGilligan (FG)	3 seats 1948–1961
16th	1957	Vivion de Valera (FF)	Colm Gallagher (FF)	Patrick McGilligan (FG)	3 seats 1948–1961
16th	1957 by-election	Vivion de Valera (FF)	Frank Sherwin (Ind.)	Patrick McGilligan (FG)	3 seats 1948–1961
17th	1961	Vivion de Valera (FF)	Frank Sherwin (Ind.)	Patrick McGilligan (FG)	Celia Lynch (FF)
18th	1965	Vivion de Valera (FF)	Michael O'Leary (Lab)	Luke Belton (FG)	Celia Lynch (FF)
19th	1969	George Colley (FF)	Michael O'Leary (Lab)	Luke Belton (FG)	Celia Lynch (FF)
20th	1973	George Colley (FF)	Michael O'Leary (Lab)	Luke Belton (FG)	Celia Lynch (FF)
21st	1977	Vincent Brady (FF)	Michael O'Leary (Lab)	Michael Keating (FG)	3 seats 1977–1981
22nd	1981	Vincent Brady (FF)	Charles Haughey (FF)	Noël Browne (SLP)	George Birmingham (FG)
23rd	1982 (Feb)	Vincent Brady (FF)	Charles Haughey (FF)	Richard Bruton (FG)	George Birmingham (FG)
24th	1982 (Nov)	Vincent Brady (FF)	Charles Haughey (FF)	Richard Bruton (FG)	George Birmingham (FG)
25th	1987	Vincent Brady (FF)	Charles Haughey (FF)	Richard Bruton (FG)	George Birmingham (FG)
26th	1989	Vincent Brady (FF)	Charles Haughey (FF)	Richard Bruton (FG)	Ivor Callely (FF)
27th	1992	Seán Haughey (FF)	Derek McDowell (Lab)	Richard Bruton (FG)	Ivor Callely (FF)
28th	1997	Seán Haughey (FF)	Derek McDowell (Lab)	Richard Bruton (FG)	Ivor Callely (FF)
29th	2002	Seán Haughey (FF)	Finian McGrath (Ind.)	Richard Bruton (FG)	Ivor Callely (FF)
30th	2007	Seán Haughey (FF)	Finian McGrath (Ind.)	Richard Bruton (FG)	3 seats from 2007
31st	2011	Aodhán Ó Ríordáin (Lab)	Finian McGrath (Ind.)	Richard Bruton (FG)	3 seats from 2007
32nd	2016	Constituency abolished. See Dublin Bay North			
