= Brendan Daly (politician) =

Irish politician (1940–2023)

Minister for Social Welfare
- In office 13 November 1991 – 11 February 1992
- Taoiseach: Charles Haughey
- Preceded by: Michael Woods
- Succeeded by: Charlie McCreevy

Minister for Defence
- In office 5 February – 14 November 1991
- Taoiseach: Charles Haughey
- Preceded by: Charles Haughey (acting)
- Succeeded by: Vincent Brady

Minister for the Marine
- In office 10 March 1987 – 12 July 1989
- Taoiseach: Charles Haughey
- Preceded by: Paddy O'Toole
- Succeeded by: John Wilson

Minister for Fisheries and Forestry
- In office 9 March – 14 December 1982
- Taoiseach: Charles Haughey
- Preceded by: Paddy O'Toole
- Succeeded by: Tom Fitzpatrick

Minister of State
- 1992–1993: Foreign Affairs
- 1989–1991: Finance
- 1989–1991: Taoiseach
- 1980–1981: Labour

Senator
- In office 12 September 2002 – 13 September 2007
- Constituency: Labour Panel
- In office 17 February 1993 – 6 June 1997
- Constituency: Agricultural Panel
- In office 3 December 1992 – 17 February 1993
- Constituency: Nominated by the Taoiseach

Teachta Dála
- In office June 1997 – May 2002
- In office February 1973 – November 1992
- Constituency: Clare

Personal details
- Born: 2 February 1940 Cooraclare, County Clare, Ireland
- Died: 6 July 2023 (aged 83) County Clare, Ireland
- Party: Fianna Fáil
- Spouse: Patricia Carmody (m. 1970; died 2014)
- Children: 3

Brendan Daly (2 February 1940 – 6 July 2023) was an Irish Fianna Fáil politician. He was a long-serving Teachta Dála (TD) for the Clare constituency, a government minister, and Senator.

== Life and career ==
Daly was born on 2 February 1940 in Cooraclare, County Clare, and educated locally at CBS Kilrush school. His political career began at the 1973 general election, when he was elected to Dáil Éireann as a Fianna Fáil TD for Clare. When Daly ran in the next general election in 1977, Limerick-based journalist Arthur Quinlan described him in the Irish Times as “a 37-year-old bundle of energy who has concentrated all his efforts on making his career out of politics”. Quinlan was sceptical that Daly would top the poll, but in the end he did so, getting elected on the first count. His first-preference total of 11,933 was more than double the figure of 5,758 he got in 1973 although he said: “I worked for every single vote I got" He held his seat at five further general elections before losing it at the 1992 general election. He was returned at the 1997 general election but was defeated again in the 2002 general election.

Daly was a strong supporter of Charles Haughey during his period as Fianna Fáil leader. In 1980 Daly became Minister of State at the Department of Labour. In 1982 he joined the Cabinet as Minister for Fisheries and Forestry. When Fianna Fáil returned to power after the 1987 general election he once again became a minister, this time as Minister for the Marine in the 20th Government of Ireland.

Daly was not re-appointed a minister when Fianna Fáil entered into coalition with the Progressive Democrats after the 1989 general election, but was appointed Minister of State at the Department of the Taoiseach with responsibility for Heritage Affairs and Minister of State at the Department of Finance with responsibility for the Office of Public Works. He returned to the cabinet in February 1991 as Minister for Defence. In November Albert Reynolds and Pádraig Flynn were sacked from the government and Daly was appointed Minister for Social Welfare. His time in cabinet was short-lived; in February 1992, Haughey resigned as Taoiseach and was succeeded by Reynolds, who did not appoint Daly to cabinet. He was appointed Minister of State at the Department of Foreign Affairs from February 1992.

Daly lost his Dáil seat in the election that year, retaining his position as Minister of State until the formation of a new government in January 1993. He contested the Seanad election on the Agricultural Panel, and was returned to the 20th Seanad.

Daly was re-elected to the Dáil at the 1997 general election but lost his seat at the 2002 general election. He stood for election to the 22nd Seanad on the Labour Panel, and was returned to the Seanad for a second time. He was unsuccessful again at 2007 general election, and did not contest the subsequent elections to the 23rd Seanad. He then retired from public life.

Brendan Daly was married to Patricia Carmody of Kilrush, County Clare, from the early 1970s until her death in 2014; they had three children. Daly died on 6 July 2023, aged 83.

In the Dáil, Fianna Fáil leader Micheál Martin paid tribute to Daly as “an extraordinarily committed public servant” who had served in several departments.

Political offices
New office	Minister of State at the Department of Labour; 1980–1981	Office abolished
Preceded by Tom Fitzpatrick	Minister for Fisheries and Forestry; 1982	Succeeded by Paddy O'Toole
Preceded by Paddy O'Toole	Minister for the Marine; 1987–1989	Succeeded by John Wilson
Preceded by Noel Treacy	Minister of State at the Department of Finance; 1989–1991	Succeeded by Vincent Brady
Preceded by Noel Treacy	Minister of State at the Department of the Taoiseach; 1989–1991	Succeeded by Tom Kitt
Preceded by Charles Haughey	Minister for Defence; 1991	Succeeded by Vincent Brady
Preceded by Michael Woods	Minister for Social Welfare; 1991–1992	Succeeded by Charlie McCreevy
Preceded by Seán Calleary	Minister of State at the Department of Foreign Affairs; 1992–1993	Succeeded by Tom Kitt

Dáil	Election	Deputy (Party)	Deputy (Party)	Deputy (Party)	Deputy (Party)	Deputy (Party)
2nd	1921	Éamon de Valera (SF)	Brian O'Higgins (SF)	Seán Liddy (SF)	Patrick Brennan (SF)	4 seats 1921–1923
3rd	1922	Éamon de Valera (AT-SF)	Brian O'Higgins (AT-SF)	Seán Liddy (PT-SF)	Patrick Brennan (PT-SF)	4 seats 1921–1923
4th	1923	Éamon de Valera (Rep)	Brian O'Higgins (Rep)	Conor Hogan (FP)	Patrick Hogan (Lab)	Eoin MacNeill (CnaG)
5th	1927 (Jun)	Éamon de Valera (FF)	Patrick Houlihan (FF)	Thomas Falvey (FP)	Patrick Hogan (Lab)	Patrick Kelly (CnaG)
6th	1927 (Sep)	Éamon de Valera (FF)	Patrick Houlihan (FF)	Martin Sexton (FF)	Patrick Hogan (Lab)	Patrick Kelly (CnaG)
7th	1932	Éamon de Valera (FF)	Seán O'Grady (FF)	Martin Sexton (FF)	Patrick Hogan (Lab)	Patrick Burke (CnaG)
8th	1933	Éamon de Valera (FF)	Seán O'Grady (FF)	Patrick Houlihan (FF)	Patrick Hogan (Lab)	Patrick Burke (CnaG)
9th	1937	Éamon de Valera (FF)	Seán O'Grady (FF)	Thomas Burke (FP)	Patrick Hogan (Lab)	Patrick Burke (FG)
10th	1938	Éamon de Valera (FF)	Seán O'Grady (FF)	Thomas Burke (FP)	Peter O'Loghlen (FF)	Patrick Burke (FG)
11th	1943	Éamon de Valera (FF)	Seán O'Grady (FF)	Thomas Burke (FP)	Patrick Hogan (Lab)	Patrick Burke (FG)
12th	1944	Éamon de Valera (FF)	Seán O'Grady (FF)	Thomas Burke (FP)	Peter O'Loghlen (FF)	Patrick Burke (FG)
12th	1945 by-election	Éamon de Valera (FF)	Seán O'Grady (FF)	Thomas Burke (FP)	Peter O'Loghlen (FF)	Patrick Shanahan (FF)
13th	1948	Éamon de Valera (FF)	Seán O'Grady (FF)	Thomas Burke (FP)	Patrick Hogan (Lab)	4 seats 1948–1969
14th	1951	Éamon de Valera (FF)	Patrick Hillery (FF)	William Murphy (FG)	Patrick Hogan (Lab)	4 seats 1948–1969
15th	1954	Éamon de Valera (FF)	Patrick Hillery (FF)	William Murphy (FG)	Patrick Hogan (Lab)	4 seats 1948–1969
16th	1957	Éamon de Valera (FF)	Patrick Hillery (FF)	William Murphy (FG)	Patrick Hogan (Lab)	4 seats 1948–1969
16th	1959 by-election	Seán Ó Ceallaigh (FF)	Patrick Hillery (FF)	William Murphy (FG)	Patrick Hogan (Lab)	4 seats 1948–1969
17th	1961	Seán Ó Ceallaigh (FF)	Patrick Hillery (FF)	William Murphy (FG)	Patrick Hogan (Lab)	4 seats 1948–1969
18th	1965	Seán Ó Ceallaigh (FF)	Patrick Hillery (FF)	William Murphy (FG)	Patrick Hogan (Lab)	4 seats 1948–1969
18th	1968 by-election	Seán Ó Ceallaigh (FF)	Patrick Hillery (FF)	Sylvester Barrett (FF)	Patrick Hogan (Lab)	4 seats 1948–1969
19th	1969	Frank Taylor (FG)	Patrick Hillery (FF)	Sylvester Barrett (FF)	3 seats 1969–1981	
20th	1973	Frank Taylor (FG)	Brendan Daly (FF)	Sylvester Barrett (FF)	3 seats 1969–1981	
21st	1977	Frank Taylor (FG)	Brendan Daly (FF)	Sylvester Barrett (FF)	3 seats 1969–1981	
22nd	1981	Madeleine Taylor (FG)	Brendan Daly (FF)	Sylvester Barrett (FF)	Bill Loughnane (FF)	4 seats since 1981
23rd	1982 (Feb)	Donal Carey (FG)	Brendan Daly (FF)	Sylvester Barrett (FF)	Bill Loughnane (FF)	4 seats since 1981
24th	1982 (Nov)	Donal Carey (FG)	Brendan Daly (FF)	Sylvester Barrett (FF)	Madeleine Taylor-Quinn (FG)	4 seats since 1981
25th	1987	Donal Carey (FG)	Brendan Daly (FF)	Síle de Valera (FF)	Madeleine Taylor-Quinn (FG)	4 seats since 1981
26th	1989	Donal Carey (FG)	Brendan Daly (FF)	Síle de Valera (FF)	Madeleine Taylor-Quinn (FG)	4 seats since 1981
27th	1992	Donal Carey (FG)	Moosajee Bhamjee (Lab)	Síle de Valera (FF)	Tony Killeen (FF)	4 seats since 1981
28th	1997	Donal Carey (FG)	Brendan Daly (FF)	Síle de Valera (FF)	Tony Killeen (FF)	4 seats since 1981
29th	2002	Pat Breen (FG)	James Breen (Ind.)	Síle de Valera (FF)	Tony Killeen (FF)	4 seats since 1981
30th	2007	Pat Breen (FG)	Joe Carey (FG)	Timmy Dooley (FF)	Tony Killeen (FF)	4 seats since 1981
31st	2011	Pat Breen (FG)	Joe Carey (FG)	Timmy Dooley (FF)	Michael McNamara (Lab)	4 seats since 1981
32nd	2016	Pat Breen (FG)	Joe Carey (FG)	Timmy Dooley (FF)	Michael Harty (Ind.)	4 seats since 1981
33rd	2020	Violet-Anne Wynne (SF)	Joe Carey (FG)	Cathal Crowe (FF)	Michael McNamara (Ind.)	4 seats since 1981
34th	2024	Donna McGettigan (SF)	Joe Cooney (FG)	Cathal Crowe (FF)	Timmy Dooley (FF)	4 seats since 1981
