= Joe McCartin =

Irish former politician (born 1939)

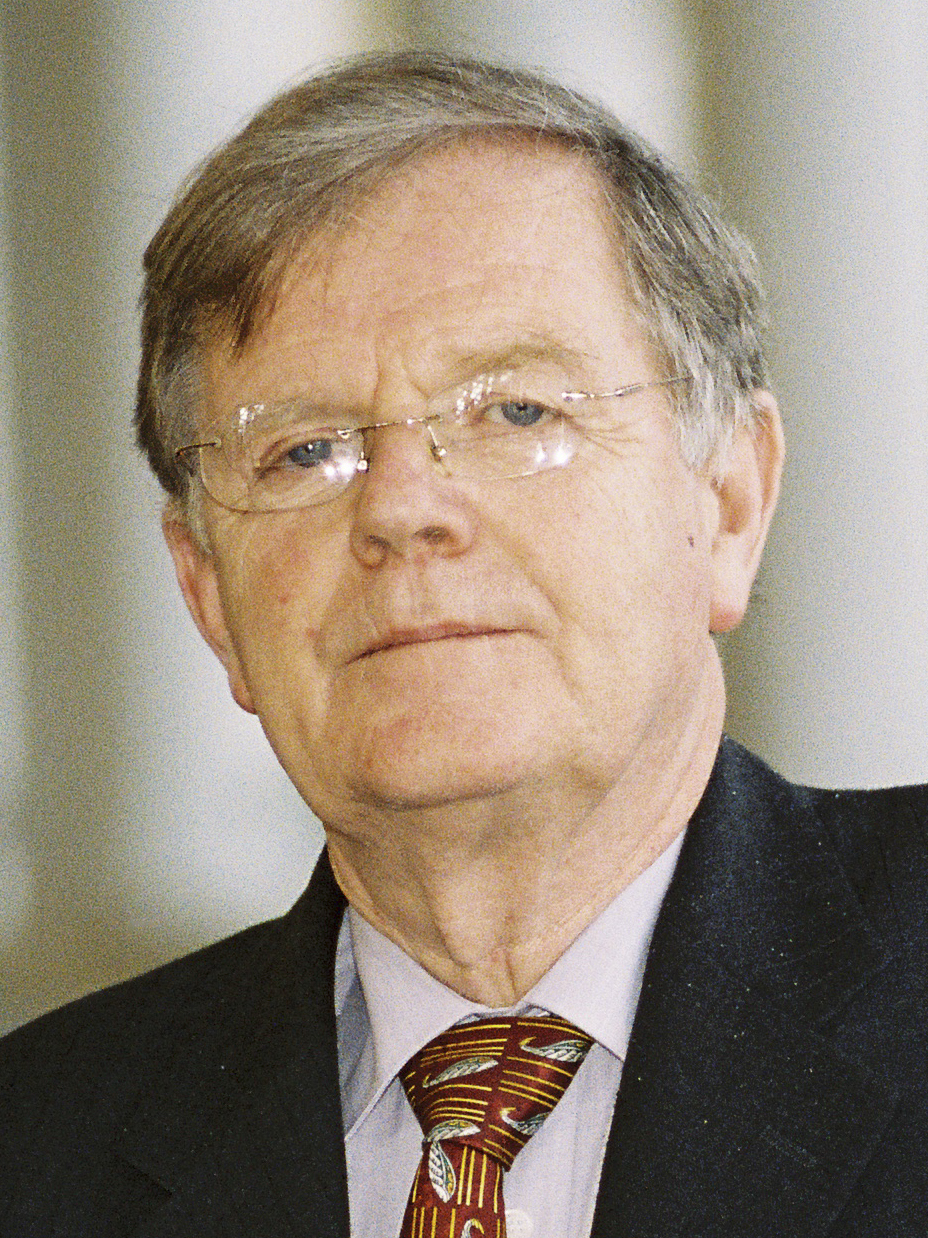
- McCartin in 2004

Member of the European Parliament
- In office 7 June 1979 – 24 June 2004
- Constituency: Connacht–Ulster

Teachta Dála
- In office November 1982 – February 1987
- In office June 1981 – February 1982
- Constituency: Sligo–Leitrim

Senator
- In office 1 June 1973 – 11 June 1981
- Constituency: Agricultural Panel

Personal details
- Born: John Joseph McCartin; 24 April 1939 (age 86) Ballinamore, County Leitrim, Ireland
- Party: Fine Gael
- Spouse: Ann Clarke (m. 1972)
- Children: 2
- Education: St Patrick's College, Cavan

John Joseph McCartin (born 24 April 1939) is an Irish former Fine Gael politician who served as a Member of the European Parliament (MEP) for the Connacht–Ulster constituency from 1979 to 2004. He served as a Teachta Dála (TD) for the Sligo–Leitrim constituency from 1981 to 1982 and 1982 to 1987. He also served as a Senator for the Agricultural Panel from 1973 to 1981.

== Early life ==
He was born at Aughnasheelan, Ballinamore, County Leitrim, the son of small farmer Francis McCartin and his wife Annie Kate Lohan. He was educated at Drumbibe National School, Aughnasheelan and St Patrick's College, Cavan. In 1972, he married Ann Clarke; they had two children. As a young farmer, McCartin was awarded many national prizes for progressive and efficient farming. He founded the McCartin Bros group of companies with his brother Tommy; these had interests in Structural Steel, Clothing Manufacture, Milling, Forestry, Pig Production, and Dairy/Beef Farming. They quickly became the largest employers in Leitrim.

== Political career ==
McCartin joined Fine Gael as a teenager and became secretary of the Ballinamore District Executive at the age of seventeen. He served as county secretary of Macra na Feirme and was a member of its national executive. He was chair of the fundraising committee which established the first rehabilitation centre in the north-west of Ireland. He was elected to Leitrim County Council in 1967. In 1973, he was elected to Seanad Éireann as a senator for the Agricultural Panel, and after his re-election to the Seanad in 1977 he was elected Leas-Chathaoirleach of the 14th Seanad.

He was elected to the European Parliament in 1979 for the Connacht–Ulster constituency and to the Dáil at the 1981 general election representing the Sligo–Leitrim constituency. He served as secretary of the Fine Gael parliamentary party, and party spokesperson for Agriculture. He lost his seat at the February 1982 general election but regained it at the November 1982 general election. He lost it at the subsequent 1987 general election and did not stand in any further Dáil elections.

In the European Parliament, McCartin was elected vice chair of the parliament's Budgetary Control committee. He was the first Irish person ever to hold the position of vice president of the European People's Party. He also served on the parliament's Agriculture and Fisheries committees. He was Joint Auditor of the European People's Party, along with former Taoiseach John Bruton. He retired from the European Parliament in 2004.

In 1974, he was elected Leitrim Person of the Year. In 1977, he was named as one of Ireland's "People of the Year" for "bringing hope to a depressed area."

In 2004, he was presented with the Schuman Medal at a meeting of the European Christian Democrats in Budapest, for "his outstanding contribution to peace and unity in Europe and for the promotion of the human values of mankind".

Dáil	Election	Deputy (Party)	Deputy (Party)	Deputy (Party)	Deputy (Party)	Deputy (Party)
13th	1948	Eugene Gilbride (FF)	Stephen Flynn (FF)	Bernard Maguire (Ind.)	Mary Reynolds (FG)	Joseph Roddy (FG)
14th	1951	Eugene Gilbride (FF)	Stephen Flynn (FF)	Patrick Rogers (FG)	Mary Reynolds (FG)	Joseph Roddy (FG)
15th	1954	Eugene Gilbride (FF)	Stephen Flynn (FF)	Bernard Maguire (Ind.)	Mary Reynolds (FG)	Joseph Roddy (FG)
16th	1957	Eugene Gilbride (FF)	Stephen Flynn (FF)	John Joe McGirl (SF)	Mary Reynolds (FG)	Patrick Rogers (FG)
16th	1961 by-election	Eugene Gilbride (FF)	Joseph McLoughlin (FG)	John Joe McGirl (SF)	Mary Reynolds (FG)	Patrick Rogers (FG)
17th	1961	Eugene Gilbride (FF)	Joseph McLoughlin (FG)	James Gallagher (FF)	Eugene Gilhawley (FG)	4 seats 1961–1969
18th	1965	Eugene Gilbride (FF)	Joseph McLoughlin (FG)	James Gallagher (FF)	Eugene Gilhawley (FG)	4 seats 1961–1969
19th	1969	Ray MacSharry (FF)	Joseph McLoughlin (FG)	James Gallagher (FF)	3 seats 1969–1981	
20th	1973	Ray MacSharry (FF)	Joseph McLoughlin (FG)	Eugene Gilhawley (FG)	3 seats 1969–1981	
21st	1977	Ray MacSharry (FF)	James Gallagher (FF)	Eugene Gilhawley (FG)	3 seats 1969–1981	
22nd	1981	Ray MacSharry (FF)	John Ellis (FF)	Joe McCartin (FG)	Ted Nealon (FG)	4 seats 1981–2007
23rd	1982 (Feb)	Ray MacSharry (FF)	John Ellis (FF)	Matt Brennan (FF)	Ted Nealon (FG)	4 seats 1981–2007
24th	1982 (Nov)	Ray MacSharry (FF)	Joe McCartin (FG)	Matt Brennan (FF)	Ted Nealon (FG)	4 seats 1981–2007
25th	1987	Ray MacSharry (FF)	John Ellis (FF)	Matt Brennan (FF)	Ted Nealon (FG)	4 seats 1981–2007
26th	1989	Gerry Reynolds (FG)	John Ellis (FF)	Matt Brennan (FF)	Ted Nealon (FG)	4 seats 1981–2007
27th	1992	Declan Bree (Lab)	John Ellis (FF)	Matt Brennan (FF)	Ted Nealon (FG)	4 seats 1981–2007
28th	1997	Gerry Reynolds (FG)	John Ellis (FF)	Matt Brennan (FF)	John Perry (FG)	4 seats 1981–2007
29th	2002	Marian Harkin (Ind.)	John Ellis (FF)	Jimmy Devins (FF)	John Perry (FG)	4 seats 1981–2007
30th	2007	Constituency abolished. See Sligo–North Leitrim and Roscommon–South Leitrim				

Dáil	Election	Deputy (Party)	Deputy (Party)	Deputy (Party)	Deputy (Party)
32nd	2016	Martin Kenny (SF)	Marc MacSharry (FF)	Eamon Scanlon (FF)	Tony McLoughlin (FG)
33rd	2020	Martin Kenny (SF)	Marc MacSharry (FF)	Marian Harkin (Ind.)	Frank Feighan (FG)
34th	2024	Martin Kenny (SF)	Eamon Scanlon (FF)	Marian Harkin (Ind.)	Frank Feighan (FG)
