= Patrick Cooney =

Irish politician (1931–2025)

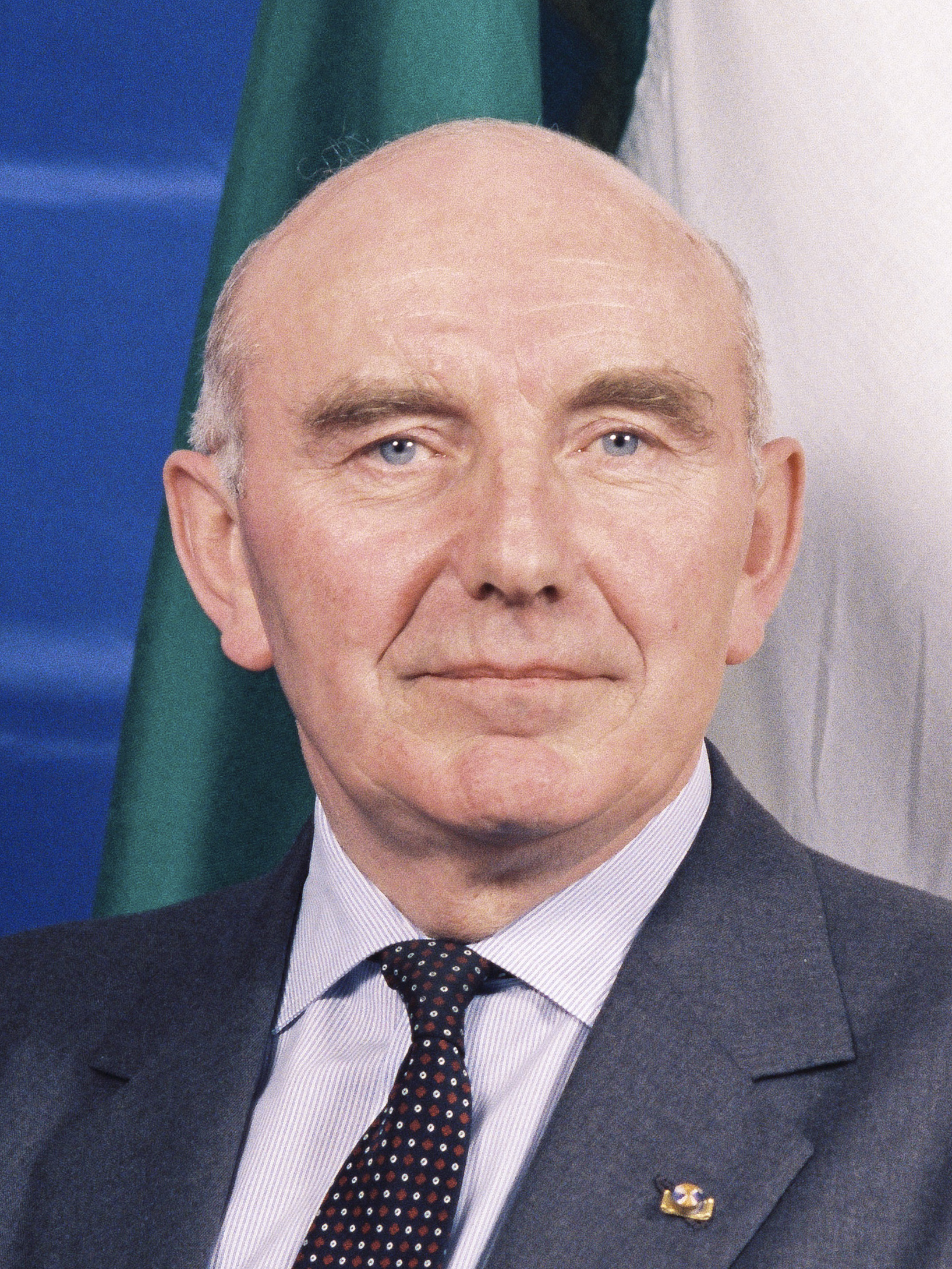
- Cooney in 1994

Minister for Education
- In office 14 February 1986 – 10 March 1987
- Taoiseach: Garret FitzGerald
- Preceded by: Gemma Hussey
- Succeeded by: Mary O'Rourke

Minister for Defence
- In office 14 December 1982 – 14 February 1986
- Taoiseach: Garret FitzGerald
- Preceded by: Paddy Power
- Succeeded by: Paddy O'Toole

Minister for Transport
- In office 30 June 1981 – 9 March 1982
- Taoiseach: Garret FitzGerald
- Preceded by: Albert Reynolds
- Succeeded by: John Wilson

Minister for Posts and Telegraphs
- In office 30 June 1981 – 9 March 1982
- Taoiseach: Garret FitzGerald
- Preceded by: Albert Reynolds
- Succeeded by: John Wilson

Minister for Justice
- In office 14 March 1973 – 5 July 1977
- Taoiseach: Liam Cosgrave
- Preceded by: Desmond O'Malley
- Succeeded by: Gerry Collins

Member of the European Parliament
- In office 1 July 1989 – 24 May 1994
- Constituency: Leinster

Teachta Dála
- In office June 1981 – June 1989
- In office April 1970 – June 1977
- Constituency: Longford–Westmeath

Senator
- In office 27 October 1977 – 11 June 1981
- Constituency: Cultural and Educational Panel

Personal details
- Born: 2 March 1931 Dublin, Ireland
- Died: 6 December 2025 (aged 94) Dublin, Ireland
- Party: Fine Gael
- Spouse: Brigid McMenamin (m. 1958)
- Children: 4
- Education: University College Dublin

Patrick Mark Cooney (2 March 1931 – 6 December 2025) was an Irish Fine Gael politician who served as a government minister in the cabinets of Liam Cosgrave (1973–1977) and Garret FitzGerald (1981–1982 and 1982–1987). He served as a Member of the European Parliament (MEP) for the Leinster constituency from 1989 to 1994. He served as a Teachta Dála (TD) for the Longford–Westmeath constituency from 1970 to 1977 and between 1981 and 1989. He also served as a Senator for the Cultural and Educational Panel from 1977 to 1981.

== Background ==
Cooney was born on 2 March 1931, and educated at Castleknock College and University College Dublin, where he completed a BA in 1951 and an LLB (Bachelor of Laws) in 1953. He first stood as a candidate for Dáil Éireann in the Longford–Westmeath constituency at the 1961 general election but failed to win a seat, and he was defeated again in 1965 and 1969.

Cooney died on 6 December 2025, at the age of 94.

== Political career ==
After the death of the Fianna Fáil TD Patrick Lenihan, Cooney was elected to the 19th Dáil in the Longford–Westmeath by-election in April 1970.

At the 1973 general election, Cooney not only managed to hold on to the former Fianna Fáil seat he had won in the previous by-election but "also managed to top the poll on this occasion."

This election saw a Fine Gael–Labour Party National Coalition government take office, and Cooney was appointed to Liam Cosgrave's cabinet as Minister for Justice. He ordered the coffin of Frank Stagg to be covered in concrete. In December 1973, the Supreme Court found in McGee v. The Attorney General that marital privacy was protected by the Constitution of Ireland, including a right to contraception. Cooney proposed the Control of Importation, Sale and Manufacture of Contraceptives Bill 1974, which was defeated in the Dáil on a free vote, with Cosgrave voting against the legislation proposed by a member of his cabinet.

Cooney was one of several cabinet ministers to lose his seat at the 1977 general election but was subsequently elected to the 14th Seanad as a Senator for the Cultural and Educational Panel.

In October 1977, he was the subject of a libellous column by the Sunday World and went on to win £28,000 libel damages said by one former Dublin newspaper editor to be the "result of a combination of unprofessional journalism, editorial strife within the paper and managerial timidity".

In 1979, at the first direct elections to the European Parliament, he stood unsuccessfully in the Connacht–Ulster constituency.

At the 1981 general election, he was returned to the Dáil again for his old Longford–Westmeath constituency. Under Garret FitzGerald, Cooney served as Minister for Transport and Minister for Posts and Telegraphs from June 1981 to March 1982, as Minister for Defence from December 1982 to February 1986, and as Minister for Education from 1986 to 1987.

He was elected as a MEP for the Leinster constituency at the 1989 European Parliament elections and did not contest the 1989 general election. He did not stand for re-election in 1994.

== See also ==
- Families in the Oireachtas

Political offices
| Preceded by Desmond O'Malley | Minister for Justice; 1973–1977 | Succeeded by Gerry Collins |
| Preceded by Albert Reynolds | Minister for Posts and Telegraphs; 1981–1982 | Succeeded by John Wilson |
| Preceded by Albert Reynolds | Minister for Transport; 1981–1982 | Succeeded by John Wilson |
| Preceded by Paddy Power | Minister for Defence; 1982–1986 | Succeeded by Paddy O'Toole |
| Preceded by Gemma Hussey | Minister for Education; 1986–1987 | Succeeded by Mary O'Rourke |

| Dáil | Election | Deputy (Party) | Deputy (Party) | Deputy (Party) | Deputy (Party) | Deputy (Party) |
|---|---|---|---|---|---|---|
| 2nd | 1921 | Lorcan Robbins (SF) | Seán Mac Eoin (SF) | Joseph McGuinness (SF) | Laurence Ginnell (SF) | 4 seats 1921–1923 |
| 3rd | 1922 | John Lyons (Lab) | Seán Mac Eoin (PT-SF) | Francis McGuinness (PT-SF) | Laurence Ginnell (AT-SF) | 4 seats 1921–1923 |
| 4th | 1923 | John Lyons (Ind.) | Conor Byrne (Rep) | James Killane (Rep) | Patrick Shaw (CnaG) | Patrick McKenna (FP) |
| 5th | 1927 (Jun) | Henry Broderick (Lab) | Michael Kennedy (FF) | James Victory (FF) | Patrick Shaw (CnaG) | Hugh Garahan (FP) |
| 6th | 1927 (Sep) | Henry Broderick (Lab) | Michael Kennedy (FF) | James Killane (FF) | Patrick Shaw (CnaG) | Michael Connolly (CnaG) |
| 6th | 1930 by-election | Henry Broderick (Lab) | Michael Kennedy (FF) | James Geoghegan (FF) | Patrick Shaw (CnaG) | Michael Connolly (CnaG) |
| 7th | 1932 | Francis Gormley (FF) | Michael Kennedy (FF) | James Geoghegan (FF) | Patrick Shaw (CnaG) | Seán Mac Eoin (CnaG) |
| 8th | 1933 | James Victory (FF) | Michael Kennedy (FF) | James Geoghegan (FF) | Charles Fagan (NCP) | Seán Mac Eoin (CnaG) |
| 9th | 1937 | Constituency abolished. See Athlone–Longford and Meath–Westmeath | | | | |

| Dáil | Election | Deputy (Party) | Deputy (Party) | Deputy (Party) | Deputy (Party) | Deputy (Party) |
|---|---|---|---|---|---|---|
| 13th | 1948 | Erskine H. Childers (FF) | Thomas Carter (FF) | Michael Kennedy (FF) | Seán Mac Eoin (FG) | Charles Fagan (Ind.) |
| 14th | 1951 | Erskine H. Childers (FF) | Frank Carter (FF) | Michael Kennedy (FF) | Seán Mac Eoin (FG) | Charles Fagan (Ind.) |
| 15th | 1954 | Erskine H. Childers (FF) | Frank Carter (FF) | Michael Kennedy (FF) | Seán Mac Eoin (FG) | Charles Fagan (FG) |
| 16th | 1957 | Erskine H. Childers (FF) | Ruairí Ó Brádaigh (SF) | Michael Kennedy (FF) | Seán Mac Eoin (FG) | Charles Fagan (FG) |
| 17th | 1961 | Frank Carter (FF) | Joe Sheridan (Ind.) | Michael Kennedy (FF) | Seán Mac Eoin (FG) | 4 seats 1961–1992 |
| 18th | 1965 | Frank Carter (FF) | Joe Sheridan (Ind.) | Patrick Lenihan (FF) | Gerry L'Estrange (FG) | 4 seats 1961–1992 |
| 19th | 1969 | Frank Carter (FF) | Joe Sheridan (Ind.) | Patrick Lenihan (FF) | Gerry L'Estrange (FG) | 4 seats 1961–1992 |
| 19th | 1970 by-election | Frank Carter (FF) | Joe Sheridan (Ind.) | Patrick Cooney (FG) | Gerry L'Estrange (FG) | 4 seats 1961–1992 |
| 20th | 1973 | Frank Carter (FF) | Joe Sheridan (Ind.) | Patrick Cooney (FG) | Gerry L'Estrange (FG) | 4 seats 1961–1992 |
| 21st | 1977 | Albert Reynolds (FF) | Joe Sheridan (Ind.) | Seán Keegan (FF) | Gerry L'Estrange (FG) | 4 seats 1961–1992 |
| 22nd | 1981 | Albert Reynolds (FF) | Patrick Cooney (FG) | Seán Keegan (FF) | Gerry L'Estrange (FG) | 4 seats 1961–1992 |
| 23rd | 1982 (Feb) | Albert Reynolds (FF) | Patrick Cooney (FG) | Seán Keegan (FF) | Gerry L'Estrange (FG) | 4 seats 1961–1992 |
| 24th | 1982 (Nov) | Albert Reynolds (FF) | Patrick Cooney (FG) | Mary O'Rourke (FF) | Gerry L'Estrange (FG) | 4 seats 1961–1992 |
| 25th | 1987 | Albert Reynolds (FF) | Patrick Cooney (FG) | Mary O'Rourke (FF) | Henry Abbott (FF) | 4 seats 1961–1992 |
| 26th | 1989 | Albert Reynolds (FF) | Louis Belton (FG) | Mary O'Rourke (FF) | Paul McGrath (FG) | 4 seats 1961–1992 |
| 27th | 1992 | Constituency abolished. See Longford–Roscommon and Westmeath | | | | |

| Dáil | Election | Deputy (Party) | Deputy (Party) | Deputy (Party) | Deputy (Party) | Deputy (Party) |
|---|---|---|---|---|---|---|
| 30th | 2007 | Willie Penrose (Lab) | Peter Kelly (FF) | Mary O'Rourke (FF) | James Bannon (FG) | 4 seats 2007–2024 |
| 31st | 2011 | Willie Penrose (Lab) | Robert Troy (FF) | Nicky McFadden (FG) | James Bannon (FG) | 4 seats 2007–2024 |
| 31st | 2014 by-election | Willie Penrose (Lab) | Robert Troy (FF) | Gabrielle McFadden (FG) | James Bannon (FG) | 4 seats 2007–2024 |
| 32nd | 2016 | Willie Penrose (Lab) | Robert Troy (FF) | Kevin "Boxer" Moran (Ind.) | Peter Burke (FG) | 4 seats 2007–2024 |
| 33rd | 2020 | Sorca Clarke (SF) | Robert Troy (FF) | Joe Flaherty (FF) | Peter Burke (FG) | 4 seats 2007–2024 |
| 34th | 2024 | Sorca Clarke (SF) | Robert Troy (FF) | Kevin "Boxer" Moran (Ind.) | Peter Burke (FG) | Micheál Carrigy (FG) |
