= P. J. Morley =

Irish politician (1931–2012)

Teachta Dála
- In office June 1977 – June 1997
- Constituency: Mayo East

Personal details
- Born: 1 March 1931 County Mayo, Ireland
- Died: 30 September 2012 (aged 81) County Mayo, Ireland
- Party: Fianna Fáil
- Spouse: Mary O'Boyle
- Children: 4

Patrick Joseph Morley (1 March 1931 – 30 September 2012) was an Irish Fianna Fáil politician.

Morley was from Claremorris, County Mayo. He qualified as a primary school teacher. He was first elected to Dáil Éireann as a Fianna Fáil Teachta Dála (TD) for the Mayo East constituency on his second attempt at the 1977 general election and was re-elected until losing his seat at the 1997 general election. At the 1997 general election, the Mayo East constituency was combined with Mayo West and the combined Mayo constituency was reduced to 5 seats.

He was the Chairperson of Mayo County Council from 1989 to 1991. He died in September 2012.

Dáil	Election	Deputy (Party)	Deputy (Party)	Deputy (Party)
19th	1969	Seán Flanagan (FF)	Thomas O'Hara (FG)	Martin Finn (FG)
20th	1973	Seán Flanagan (FF)	Seán Calleary (FF)	Martin Finn (FG)
21st	1977	P. J. Morley (FF)	Seán Calleary (FF)	Paddy O'Toole (FG)
22nd	1981	P. J. Morley (FF)	Seán Calleary (FF)	Paddy O'Toole (FG)
23rd	1982 (Feb)	P. J. Morley (FF)	Seán Calleary (FF)	Paddy O'Toole (FG)
24th	1982 (Nov)	P. J. Morley (FF)	Seán Calleary (FF)	Paddy O'Toole (FG)
25th	1987	P. J. Morley (FF)	Seán Calleary (FF)	Jim Higgins (FG)
26th	1989	P. J. Morley (FF)	Seán Calleary (FF)	Jim Higgins (FG)
27th	1992	P. J. Morley (FF)	Tom Moffatt (FF)	Jim Higgins (FG)
28th	1997	Constituency abolished. See Mayo		
