= Seán Calleary =

Irish politician (1931–2018)

Minister of State
- 1987–1992: Foreign Affairs
- Oct.–Dec. 1982: Trade, Commerce and Tourism
- 1979–1981: Labour
- 1979–1981: Public Service

Teachta Dála
- In office February 1973 – November 1992
- Constituency: Mayo East

Personal details
- Born: 27 October 1931 Ballina, County Mayo, Ireland
- Died: 4 June 2018 (aged 86) Galway, Ireland
- Party: Fianna Fáil
- Spouse: Doris Calleary (m. 1962)
- Children: 4, including Dara
- Parent: Phelim Calleary (father)
- Education: University College Galway

Seán Calleary (27 October 1931 – 4 June 2018) was an Irish Fianna Fáil politician who served as a Minister of State from 1979 to 1981, from October to December 1982, and from 1987 to 1992. He served as a Teachta Dála (TD) for the Mayo East constituency from 1973 to 1992.

His father Phelim Calleary had been a TD for the Mayo North constituency from 1952 to 1969. A native of Ballina, County Mayo, he was educated at Garbally College in Ballinasloe, County Galway and University College Galway where he graduated with a degree civil engineering. He was a member of Mayo County Council from 1967 to 1987, before he became a Fianna Fáil TD for Mayo East from 1973 to 1992.

When Charles Haughey took office as Taoiseach in December 1979, Calleary was appointed as Minister of State at the Department of the Public Service and Minister of State at the Department of Labour. He remained in these positions until June 1981, when Fianna Fáil lost office.

Fianna Fáil returned to government in March 1982. Calleary served briefly as Minister of State at the Department of Trade, Commerce and Tourism from October to December 1982, when Fianna Fáil lost office again.

In March 1987, Haughey returned to office, and Calleary was appointed as Minister of State at the Department of Foreign Affairs with responsibility for Overseas Aid. He was appointed to the same position in 1989. He was not retained by Albert Reynolds, who succeeded Haughey as Fianna Fáil leader and Taoiseach in February 1992.

His son Dara Calleary has been a Fianna Fáil TD for the Mayo constituency since the 2007 general election.

Calleary died on 4 June 2018 at the age of 86.

== See also ==
- Families in the Oireachtas

Political offices
Preceded by Ray MacSharry	Minister of State at the Department of Public Service; 1979–1981	Office abolished
New office	Minister of State at the Department of Labour; 1979–1981	Office abolished
New office	Minister of State at the Department of Trade, Commerce and Tourism; Oct.–Dec. 1982	Succeeded by Michael Moynihan
Preceded by George Birmingham	Minister of State at the Department of Foreign Affairs; 1987–1992	Succeeded by Brendan Daly

Dáil	Election	Deputy (Party)	Deputy (Party)	Deputy (Party)
19th	1969	Seán Flanagan (FF)	Thomas O'Hara (FG)	Martin Finn (FG)
20th	1973	Seán Flanagan (FF)	Seán Calleary (FF)	Martin Finn (FG)
21st	1977	P. J. Morley (FF)	Seán Calleary (FF)	Paddy O'Toole (FG)
22nd	1981	P. J. Morley (FF)	Seán Calleary (FF)	Paddy O'Toole (FG)
23rd	1982 (Feb)	P. J. Morley (FF)	Seán Calleary (FF)	Paddy O'Toole (FG)
24th	1982 (Nov)	P. J. Morley (FF)	Seán Calleary (FF)	Paddy O'Toole (FG)
25th	1987	P. J. Morley (FF)	Seán Calleary (FF)	Jim Higgins (FG)
26th	1989	P. J. Morley (FF)	Seán Calleary (FF)	Jim Higgins (FG)
27th	1992	P. J. Morley (FF)	Tom Moffatt (FF)	Jim Higgins (FG)
28th	1997	Constituency abolished. See Mayo		
