= 1927 Carlow–Kilkenny by-election =

By-election to the 6th Dáil

- 3 November 1927
- Turnout: 45,741 (74.1%)
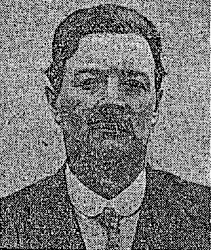
		Shelly
Nominee	Denis Gorey	Michael Shelly
Party	Cumann na nGaedheal	Fianna Fáil
First preferences	23,007	22,734
Percentage	50.3%	49.7%
TD before election
W. T. Cosgrave
Cumann na nGaedheal
TD after election
Denis Gorey
Cumann na nGaedheal

A Dáil by-election was held in the constituency of Carlow–Kilkenny in the Irish Free State on Thursday, 3 November 1927, to fill a vacancy in the 6th Dáil. It was due to W. T. Cosgrave of Cumann na nGaedheal being elected for another constituency.

At the September 1927 general election, W. T. Cosgrave was elected as a TD for both Cork Borough and for Carlow–Kilkenny. He chose to sit for Cork Borough, vacating his seat for Carlow–Kilkenny on 11 October 1927.

In 1927, Carlow–Kilkenny was an five-seat constituency comprising County Carlow and County Kilkenny.

The writ of election to fill the vacancy was agreed by the Dáil on 12 October 1927. The by-election was won by the Cumann na nGaedheal candidate Denis Gorey, by a margin of 273 votes.

== Result ==
1927 Carlow–Kilkenny by-election
Party	Candidate	FPv%	Count
Party	Candidate	FPv%	1
Cumann na nGaedheal	Denis Gorey	50.3	23,007
Fianna Fáil	Michael Shelly	49.7	22,734
Electorate: 61,724 Valid: 45,741 Quota: 22,871 Turnout: 74.1%
