= Catherine Callaghan =

Catherine Callaghan may refer to:

- Catherine Callaghan (linguist) (1931–2019), American linguist
- Catherine Callaghan (politician) (born 1974/1975), Irish politician
