= Carlow–Kilkenny =

Dáil constituency (1921–1937, 1948–present)

- Dáil constituency
- Location of Carlow–Kilkenny within Ireland
- Interactive map of constituency boundaries since the 2024 general election
- Major settlements: Bagenalstown; Carlow; Kilkenny; Tullow

Current constituency
- Created: 1948
- Seats: 5
- TDs: Catherine Callaghan (FG); Peter "Chap" Cleere (FF); John McGuinness (FF); Jennifer Murnane O'Connor (FF); Natasha Newsome Drennan (SF)
- Local government areas: County Carlow; County Kilkenny
- Created from: Carlow–Kildare; Kilkenny
- EP constituency: South

Carlow–Kilkenny
- Former Dáil constituency

Former constituency
- Created: 1921
- Abolished: 1937
- Seats: 4 (1921–1923); 5 (1923–1937)
- Local government areas: County Carlow; County Kilkenny
- Created from: County Carlow; North Kilkenny; South Kilkenny
- Replaced by: Carlow–Kildare; Kilkenny

Carlow–Kilkenny is a parliamentary constituency represented in Dáil Éireann, the lower house of the Irish parliament or Oireachtas. The constituency elects five deputies (Teachtaí Dála, commonly known as TDs) on the system of proportional representation by means of the single transferable vote (PR-STV).

== History and boundaries ==
The constituency was created in 1921 by the Government of Ireland Act 1920 as a 4-seat constituency for the Southern Ireland House of Commons and a single-seat constituency for the United Kingdom House of Commons at Westminster, combining the former Westminster constituencies of County Carlow, North Kilkenny and South Kilkenny which had formed the basis for the First Dáil. At the 1921 election for the Southern Ireland House of Commons, the four seats were won uncontested by Sinn Féin, who treated it as part of the election to the Second Dáil. It was never used as a Westminster constituency; under s. 1(4) of the Irish Free State (Agreement) Act 1922, no writ was to be issued "for a constituency in Ireland other than a constituency in Northern Ireland". Therefore, no vote was held in Carlow–Kilkenny at the 1922 United Kingdom general election on 15 November 1922, shortly before the Irish Free State left the United Kingdom on 6 December 1922.

It was recreated as a constituency in Irish legislation by the Electoral Act 1923. Carlow–Kilkenny did not exist between 1937 and 1948, when it was replaced by the constituencies of Carlow–Kildare and Kilkenny. The constituency has continued in existence since 1948.

The 2023 Report of the Electoral Commission recommended that at the next general election, Carlow–Kilkenny remain as a five-seat constituency, with the transfer of a population of 6,431 to the new constituency of Tipperary North.

The Electoral (Amendment) Act 2023 defines the constituency as:

"The county of Carlow;
and the county of Kilkenny except the parts thereof which are comprised in the constituency of Tipperary North."

Changes to the Carlow–Kilkenny constituency
Years	TDs	Boundaries	Notes
1921–1923	4	County Carlow and County Kilkenny	Constituency created from County Carlow, Kilkenny North and Kilkenny South
1923–1937	5	County Carlow and County Kilkenny	
1937–1948	—	Constituency disestablished.	Replaced by Carlow–Kildare (4 seats) and Kilkenny (3 seats), with parts of County Carlow in Wexford and Wicklow
1948–1961	5	County Carlow and County Kilkenny	
1961–1981	5	County Carlow and County Kilkenny and in County Wexford, the district electoral divisions of: Kilrush, Kiltealy, Moyacomb, Newtownbarry, Rossard, St. Mary's, Tombrack in the former rural district of Enniscorthy; Ballybeg, in the former rural district of Gorey.	
1981–1997	5	County Carlow and County Kilkenny	
1997–2020	5	County Carlow, except the part in the constituency of Wicklow; and County Kilkenny.	Transfer to Wicklow of the electoral divisions of Ballitore, Belan, Carrigeen, Castledermot, Graney, Inchaquire, Moone, Narraghmore, in the former Rural District of Athy No. 1; Ballymore Eustace, Carnalway, Gilitown, Kilcullen, Kilashee, Newtown, Usk, in the former Rural District of Naas No. 1.
2020–2024	5	County Carlow and County Kilkenny	Transfer of area in County Carlow from Wicklow
2024–	5	County Carlow; and County Kilkenny, except the part in the constituency of Tipperary North	Transfer to Tipperary North of the electoral divisions of Ballybeagh, Freshford, Rathealy, Tullaroan, in the former Rural District of Kilkenny; Balleen, Baunmore, Clomantagh, Galmoy, Glashare, Johnstown, Lisdowney, Tubbridbrittain, Urlingford, in the former Rural District of Urlingford.

== TDs ==
=== TDs 1921–1937 ===
Teachtaí Dála (TDs) for Carlow–Kilkenny 1921–1937
Key to parties: CnaG = Cumann na nGaedheal; FP = Farmers' Party; FF = Fianna Fáil; Lab = Labour; NCP = National Centre Party; Rep = Republican; SF = Sinn Féin; PT-SF = Sinn Féin (Pro-Treaty)
Dáil	Election	Deputy (Party)	Deputy (Party)	Deputy (Party)	Deputy (Party)	Deputy (Party)
2nd	1921	Edward Aylward (SF)	W. T. Cosgrave (SF)	James Lennon (SF)	Gearóid O'Sullivan (SF)	4 seats 1921–1923
3rd	1922	Patrick Gaffney (Lab)	W. T. Cosgrave (PT-SF)	Denis Gorey (FP)	Gearóid O'Sullivan (PT-SF)	4 seats 1921–1923
4th	1923	Edward Doyle (Lab)	W. T. Cosgrave (CnaG)	Denis Gorey (FP)	Michael Shelly (Rep)	Seán Gibbons (CnaG)
4th	1925 by-election	Edward Doyle (Lab)	W. T. Cosgrave (CnaG)	Denis Gorey (FP)	Michael Shelly (Rep)	Thomas Bolger (CnaG)
5th	1927 (Jun)	Edward Doyle (Lab)	W. T. Cosgrave (CnaG)	Denis Gorey (CnaG)	Thomas Derrig (FF)	Richard Holohan (FP)
6th	1927 (Sep)	Edward Doyle (Lab)	W. T. Cosgrave (CnaG)	Peter de Loughry (CnaG)	Thomas Derrig (FF)	Richard Holohan (FP)
6th	1927 by-election	Edward Doyle (Lab)	Denis Gorey (CnaG)	Peter de Loughry (CnaG)	Thomas Derrig (FF)	Richard Holohan (FP)
7th	1932	Francis Humphreys (FF)	Denis Gorey (CnaG)	Desmond FitzGerald (CnaG)	Thomas Derrig (FF)	Seán Gibbons (FF)
8th	1933	James Pattison (Lab)	Richard Holohan (NCP)	Desmond FitzGerald (CnaG)	Thomas Derrig (FF)	Seán Gibbons (FF)
9th	1937	Constituency abolished. See Kilkenny and Carlow–Kildare				

Note: The columns in this table are used only for presentational purposes, and no significance should be attached to the order of columns. For details of the order in which seats were won at each election, see the detailed results of that election.

=== TDs since 1948 ===
Teachtaí Dála (TDs) for Carlow–Kilkenny 1948–
Key to parties: FF = Fianna Fáil; FG = Fine Gael; GP = Green; Lab = Labour; NLP = National Labour Party; PDs = Progressive Democrats; SF = Sinn Féin
Dáil	Election	Deputy (Party)	Deputy (Party)	Deputy (Party)	Deputy (Party)	Deputy (Party)
13th	1948	James Pattison (NLP)	Thomas Walsh (FF)	Thomas Derrig (FF)	Joseph Hughes (FG)	Patrick Crotty (FG)
14th	1951	Francis Humphreys (FF)	Thomas Walsh (FF)	Thomas Derrig (FF)	Joseph Hughes (FG)	Patrick Crotty (FG)
15th	1954	James Pattison (Lab)	Thomas Walsh (FF)	Thomas Derrig (FF)	Joseph Hughes (FG)	Patrick Crotty (FG)
15th	1956 by-election	James Pattison (Lab)	Martin Medlar (FF)	Thomas Derrig (FF)	Joseph Hughes (FG)	Patrick Crotty (FG)
16th	1957	Francis Humphreys (FF)	Martin Medlar (FF)	Jim Gibbons (FF)	Joseph Hughes (FG)	Patrick Crotty (FG)
16th	1960 by-election	Patrick Teehan (FF)	Martin Medlar (FF)	Jim Gibbons (FF)	Joseph Hughes (FG)	Patrick Crotty (FG)
17th	1961	Séamus Pattison (Note: Pattison served as Ceann Comhairle in the 28th Dáil from 1997 to 2002, and was returned automatically at the 2002 general election.) (Lab)	Martin Medlar (FF)	Jim Gibbons (FF)	Desmond Governey (FG)	Patrick Crotty (FG)
18th	1965	Séamus Pattison (Lab)	Tom Nolan (FF)	Jim Gibbons (FF)	Desmond Governey (FG)	Patrick Crotty (FG)
19th	1969	Séamus Pattison (Lab)	Tom Nolan (FF)	Jim Gibbons (FF)	Desmond Governey (FG)	Kieran Crotty (FG)
20th	1973	Séamus Pattison (Lab)	Tom Nolan (FF)	Jim Gibbons (FF)	Desmond Governey (FG)	Kieran Crotty (FG)
21st	1977	Séamus Pattison (Lab)	Tom Nolan (FF)	Jim Gibbons (FF)	Liam Aylward (FF)	Kieran Crotty (FG)
22nd	1981	Séamus Pattison (Lab)	Tom Nolan (FF)	Desmond Governey (FG)	Liam Aylward (FF)	Kieran Crotty (FG)
23rd	1982 (Feb)	Séamus Pattison (Lab)	Jim Gibbons (FF)	Desmond Governey (FG)	Liam Aylward (FF)	Kieran Crotty (FG)
24th	1982 (Nov)	Séamus Pattison (Lab)	M. J. Nolan (FF)	Dick Dowling (FG)	Liam Aylward (FF)	Kieran Crotty (FG)
25th	1987	Séamus Pattison (Lab)	M. J. Nolan (FF)	Martin Gibbons (PDs)	Liam Aylward (FF)	Kieran Crotty (FG)
26th	1989	Séamus Pattison (Lab)	M. J. Nolan (FF)	Phil Hogan (FG)	Liam Aylward (FF)	John Browne (FG)
27th	1992	Séamus Pattison (Lab)	M. J. Nolan (FF)	Phil Hogan (FG)	Liam Aylward (FF)	John Browne (FG)
28th	1997	Séamus Pattison (Lab)	John McGuinness (FF)	Phil Hogan (FG)	Liam Aylward (FF)	John Browne (FG)
29th	2002	Séamus Pattison (Lab)	John McGuinness (FF)	Phil Hogan (FG)	Liam Aylward (FF)	M. J. Nolan (FF)
30th	2007	Mary White (GP)	John McGuinness (FF)	Phil Hogan (FG)	Bobby Aylward (FF)	M. J. Nolan (FF)
31st	2011	Ann Phelan (Lab)	John McGuinness (FF)	Phil Hogan (FG)	John Paul Phelan (FG)	Pat Deering (FG)
31st	2015 by-election	Ann Phelan (Lab)	John McGuinness (FF)	Bobby Aylward (FF)	John Paul Phelan (FG)	Pat Deering (FG)
32nd	2016	Kathleen Funchion (SF)	John McGuinness (FF)	Bobby Aylward (FF)	John Paul Phelan (FG)	Pat Deering (FG)
33rd	2020	Kathleen Funchion (SF)	John McGuinness (FF)	Jennifer Murnane O'Connor (FF)	John Paul Phelan (FG)	Malcolm Noonan (GP)
34th	2024	Natasha Newsome Drennan (SF)	John McGuinness (FF)	Jennifer Murnane O'Connor (FF)	Catherine Callaghan (FG)	Peter "Chap" Cleere (FF)

Note: The columns in this table are used only for presentational purposes, and no significance should be attached to the order of columns. For details of the order in which seats were won at each election, see the detailed results of that election.

== Elections ==
*: Outgoing TD

=== 2024 general election ===
2024 general election: Carlow–Kilkenny
Party	Candidate	FPv%	Count															
Party	Candidate	FPv%	1	2	3	4	5	6	7	8	9	10	11	12	13	14	15	16
Fianna Fáil	John McGuinness	14.0	9,794	9,797	9,841	9,856	9,887	9,947	10,102	10,612	11,063	11,513	12,049					
Fianna Fáil	Jennifer Murnane O'Connor	11.6	8,087	8,094	8,116	8,139	8,230	8,283	8,359	8,388	8,533	8,735	8,801	9,290	9,331	9,717	10,311	11,446
Fianna Fáil	Peter "Chap" Cleere	10.3	7,194	7,203	7,235	7,244	7,250	7,290	7,400	7,512	7,753	7,957	9,172	9,676	9,836	11,540	13,312	
Fine Gael	Catherine Callaghan	9.7	6,788	6,797	6,818	6,826	6,871	6,898	6,995	7,034	7,264	7,405	8,562	9,231	9,303	14,087		
Sinn Féin	Áine Gladney Knox	9.3	6,479	6,493	6,516	6,607	6,848	6,908	6,971	7,091	7,185	7,535	7,593	8,500	8,507	8,594	8,621	8,659
Sinn Féin	Natasha Newsome Drennan	7.9	5,495	5,501	5,517	5,538	5,693	5,772	5,889	6,149	6,297	6,775	6,924	8,505	8,536	8,702	8,769	8,791
Fine Gael	Michael Doyle	7.1	4,955	4,958	4,970	4,977	4,983	5,012	5,100	5,141	5,329	5,467						
Fine Gael	David Fitzgerald	6.8	4,743	4,748	4,762	4,766	4,771	4,794	4,929	5,038	5,585	5,707	7,607	8,174	8,285			
Social Democrats	Patricia Stephenson	4.8	3,387	3,395	3,421	3,433	4,044	4,101	4,509	4,665	5,802	6,284	6,425					
Green	Malcolm Noonan	4.2	2,919	2,924	2,948	2,954	3,018	3,037	3,396	3,501								
Aontú	Gary O'Neill	3.4	2,378	2,404	2,473	2,646	2,738	3,270	3,357	3,655	3,765							
Labour	Seán Ó hArgáin	2.5	1,725	1,732	1,747	1,755	1,817	1,849										
Independent	Eugene McGuinness	2.3	1,622	1,631	1,730	1,802	1,828	2,177	2,245									
PBP–Solidarity	Adrienne Wallace (Note: Wallace is a member of People Before Profit.)	2.1	1,465	1,478	1,492	1,528												
Independent	Luke O'Connor (Note: Affiliated with the National Alliance.)	1.8	1,232	1,281	1,335	1,592	1,626											
Irish Freedom	Orla Donohoe	1.1	737	793	818													
Independent	Tom Healy	0.7	501	522														
Liberty Republic	David Egan	0.2	169															
Independent	Noel G. Walsh	0.1	65															
Independent	John O'Leary	0.1	26															
Electorate: 120,821 Valid: 69,761 Spoilt: 563 Quota: 11,627 Turnout: 58.2%

=== 2020 general election ===
2020 general election: Carlow–Kilkenny
Party	Candidate	FPv%	Count									
Party	Candidate	FPv%	1	2	3	4	5	6	7	8	9	10
Sinn Féin	Kathleen Funchion	23.8	17,493									
Fianna Fáil	John McGuinness	14.3	10,558	11,021	11,298	11,622	12,201	12,612				
Fianna Fáil	Jennifer Murnane O'Connor	12.7	9,351	9,723	9,895	10,093	10,253	10,333	10,761	12,839		
Fianna Fáil	Bobby Aylward	10.3	7,550	7,791	7,920	8,124	8,408	8,642	8,819	9,174	9,632	9,985
Fine Gael	John Paul Phelan	8.7	6,396	6,498	6,547	6,752	6,975	9,429	9,548	13,172		
Fine Gael	Pat Deering	8.1	5,929	6,037	6,137	6,323	6,420	6,995	7,143			
Green	Malcolm Noonan	6.7	4,942	5,504	5,647	6,207	7,078	7,313	9,408	9,891	10,331	10,543
Fine Gael	Patrick O'Neill	5.0	3,674	3,723	3,776	3,943	4,186					
Independent	Alan Hayes	3.2	2,347	2,951	3,383	3,710						
Labour	Denis Hynes	3.0	2,208	2,610	2,712							
Solidarity–PBP	Adrienne Wallace (Note: Wallace was a member of People Before Profit.)	2.1	1,558	3,350	3,769	4,059	4,776	4,823				
Renua	Helena Byrne	1.4	992	1,164								
Irish Freedom	Melissa O'Neill	0.6	431	666								
Independent	Angela Ray	0.3	214	331								
Electorate: 114,343 Valid: 73,643 Spoilt: 546 (0.7%) Quota: 12,274 Turnout: 74,189 (64.9%)

Kathleen Funchion vacated her seat on taking her seat in the European Parliament on 16 July 2024 following her election for the South constituency at the 2024 European Parliament election. The seat remained vacant until the dissolution of the 33rd Dáil on 8 November 2024.

=== 2016 general election ===
2016 general election: Carlow–Kilkenny
Party	Candidate	FPv%	Count										
Party	Candidate	FPv%	1	2	3	4	5	6	7	8	9	10	11
Fianna Fáil	John McGuinness	15.0	10,528	10,545	10,823	10,886	10,965	11,490	11,903				
Fianna Fáil	Bobby Aylward	13.4	9,366	9,375	9,469	9,491	9,549	9,803	9,956	10,030	10,634	11,077	11,335
Sinn Féin	Kathleen Funchion	12.4	8,700	8,838	8,891	9,094	9,856	10,228	10,934	10,970	11,516	11,720	
Fianna Fáil	Jennifer Murnane O'Connor	12.0	8,373	8,436	8,502	8,540	8,745	8,919	9,023	9,049	9,371	9,459	9,518
Fine Gael	John Paul Phelan	10.8	7,568	7,577	7,689	7,713	7,768	8,080	8,420	8,450	10,222	14,200	
Fine Gael	Pat Deering	9.4	6,562	6,580	6,606	6,623	6,693	6,829	6,937	6,940	7,675	8,935	11,149
Fine Gael	David Fitzgerald	7.2	5,017	5,021	5,094	5,106	5,122	5,355	5,686	5,721	6,588		
Labour	Ann Phelan	6.3	4,391	4,396	4,442	4,465	4,548	4,740	5,566	5,596			
Green	Malcolm Noonan	3.7	2,621	2,655	2,717	2,816	3,208	3,660					
Renua	Patrick McKee	3.5	2,483	2,511	2,656	2,752	3,005						
AAA–PBP	Adrienne Wallace	2.3	1,582	1,728	1,769	2,342							
AAA–PBP	Conor MacLiam	1.6	1,120	1,179	1,231								
Independent	Paddy Manning	1.5	1,078	1,142									
Independent	Keith Gilligan	0.7	456										
Independent	Noel G. Walsh	0.2	164										
Electorate: 107,023 Valid: 70,009 Spoilt: 505 (0.7%) Quota: 11,669 Turnout: 70,514 (65.9%)

=== 2015 by-election ===
Phil Hogan ceased to be a member of the Dáil on 1 November 2014, on taking office as a European Commissioner. The by-election took place on 22 May 2015, the same date as referendums on marriage equality and the age of eligibility for the presidency.

2015 by-election: Carlow–Kilkenny
Party	Candidate	FPv%	Count								
Party	Candidate	FPv%	1	2	3	4	5	6	7	8	9
Fianna Fáil	Bobby Aylward	27.8	18,572	18,713	18,845	19,223	19,480	19,898	20,950	22,826	26,529
Fine Gael	David Fitzgerald	20.6	13,744	13,826	13,895	14,174	14,289	15,058	16,612	18,875	21,632
Sinn Féin	Kathleen Funchion	16.2	10,806	11,006	11,501	11,974	13,113	13,879	14,632	16,437	
Renua	Patrick McKee	9.5	6,365	6,530	6,736	7,225	7,678	8,532	9,269		
Labour	Willie Quinn	7.0	4,673	4,803	4,853	4,954	5,252	5,775			
Green	Malcolm Noonan	5.3	3,549	3,651	3,836	4,257	4,528				
Independent	Breda Gardner	4.2	2,792	3,016	3,226						
People Before Profit	Adrienne Wallace	3.6	2,377	2,644	3,256	3,640					
Anti-Austerity Alliance	Conor MacLiam	3.3	2,194	2,296							
Independent	Peter O'Loughlin	1.4	930								
Independent	Daithí Holohan	0.6	374								
Independent	Noel Walsh	0.4	243								
Independent	Elizabeth Hourihane	0.3	215								
Electorate: 105,449 Valid: 66,834 Spoilt: 2,066 (3.0%) Quota: 33,418 Turnout: 68,900 (65.3%)

=== 2011 general election ===
2011 general election: Carlow–Kilkenny
Party	Candidate	FPv%	Count												
Party	Candidate	FPv%	1	2	3	4	5	6	7	8	9	10	11	12	13
Fine Gael	John Paul Phelan	14.8	10,929	10,939	10,949	10,975	10,993	11,017	11,183	11,416	11,467	11,579	11,711	12,217	12,574
Fine Gael	Phil Hogan	14.3	10,525	10,537	10,540	10,558	10,565	10,587	10,772	10,934	10,968	11,120	11,207	11,770	11,997
Fianna Fáil	John McGuinness	12.9	9,531	9,543	9,548	9,583	9,595	9,612	9,767	9,939	9,999	10,108	11,805	12,630	
Labour	Ann Phelan	10.9	8,072	8,085	8,098	8,125	8,153	8,171	8,526	9,062	9,186	11,633	12,066	14,160	
Fine Gael	Pat Deering	10.1	7,470	7,474	7,483	7,491	7,502	7,597	7,654	7,964	8,238	8,908	9,967	10,335	10,486
Fianna Fáil	Bobby Aylward	9.2	6,762	6,772	6,775	6,786	6,796	6,797	6,867	6,928	6,961	7,005	8,068	8,469	8,610
Fianna Fáil	Jennifer Murnane O'Connor	6.0	4,428	4,431	4,434	4,435	4,453	4,493	4,533	4,758	5,065	5,636			
Sinn Féin	Kathleen Funchion	5.5	4,075	4,089	4,101	4,121	4,144	4,162	4,462	4,573	6,458	6,759	7,091		
Labour	Des Hurley	5.3	3,908	3,910	3,919	3,928	3,952	3,978	4,091	4,298	4,683				
Sinn Féin	John Cassin	4.0	2,958	2,959	2,966	2,970	3,003	3,034	3,216	3,314					
Green	Mary White	2.8	2,072	2,077	2,082	2,098	2,106	2,135	2,278						
Socialist Party	Conor MacLiam (Note: MacLiam was a member of the Socialist Party. He campaigned as a member of the United Left Alliance.)	1.5	1,135	1,144	1,157	1,179	1,200	1,217							
Independent	Stephen Kelly	0.8	601	625	646	681	734	820							
Independent	Johnny Couchman	0.5	384	390	410	423	471								
Independent	John O'Hara	0.3	253	270	327	345									
Independent	Raemie Leahy	0.3	256	272	277										
Independent	David Murphy	0.3	195	207											
Independent	Noel Walshe	0.2	119												
Independent	John Dalton	0.1	70												
Electorate: 105,449 Valid: 73,743 Spoilt: 821 (1.1%) Quota: 12,291 Turnout: 74,564 (70.7%)

=== 2007 general election ===
2007 general election: Carlow–Kilkenny
Party	Candidate	FPv%	Count								
Party	Candidate	FPv%	1	2	3	4	5	6	7	8	9
Fianna Fáil	John McGuinness	17.2	11,635								
Fianna Fáil	Bobby Aylward	17.1	11,600								
Fianna Fáil	M. J. Nolan	13.4	9,037	9,481	9,693	9,901	10,350	10,457	11,136	12,593	
Fine Gael	Phil Hogan	12.7	8,569	8,673	8,725	8,751	9,056	9,543	11,360		
Fine Gael	John Paul Phelan	9.6	6,494	6,548	6,568	6,604	6,841	7,361	8,170	9,499	9,815
Green	Mary White	8.0	5,386	5,533	5,560	5,573	6,266	6,695	7,405	9,883	10,464
Fine Gael	Fergal Browne	7.3	4,948	5,084	5,087	5,092	5,190	5,226			
Labour	Jim Townsend	5.0	3,401	3,529	3,534	3,536	3,732	5,285	6,389		
Labour	Michael O'Brien	4.3	2,923	2,939	2,957	2,972	3,304				
Sinn Féin	Kathleen Funchion	3.8	2,568	2,597	2,619	2,638					
Progressive Democrats	Walter Lacey	1.6	1,073								
Electorate: 102,016 Valid: 67,654 Spoilt: 705 (1.0%) Quota: 11,276 Turnout: 68,359 (67.0%)

=== 2002 general election ===
Séamus Pattison was Ceann Comhairle at the dissolution of the 28th Dáil and therefore deemed to be returned automatically. The constituency was treated as a four-seater for the purposes of calculating the quota.

2002 general election: Carlow–Kilkenny
Party	Candidate	FPv%	Count							
Party	Candidate	FPv%	1	2	3	4	5	6	7	8
Labour	Séamus Pattison	N/A	Returned automatically							
Fianna Fáil	Liam Aylward	20.5	12,489							
Fianna Fáil	John McGuinness	15.4	9,343	9,371	9,657	10,085	10,527	10,654	10,878	12,111
Fianna Fáil	M. J. Nolan	14.3	8,711	8,772	8,887	9,140	9,204	9,832	9,895	11,009
Fine Gael	Phil Hogan	12.9	7,841	7,852	8,074	8,239	8,903	12,238		
Fine Gael	Fergal Browne	8.9	5,468	5,530	5,670	5,762	5,894			
Green	Mary White	8.2	4,961	5,003	5,401	6,055	6,696	7,329	7,355	
Labour	Jim Townsend	7.0	4,272	4,330	4,415	4,568	6,625	7,646	7,653	10,615
Labour	Michael O'Brien	6.1	3,732	3,739	3,946	4,220				
Sinn Féin	Tom Kiernan	3.4	2,078	2,098	2,216					
Independent	Eddie Collins Hughes	2.6	1,614	1,644						
Independent	Billy Nolan	0.6	335							
Electorate: 97,071 Valid: 60,844 Spoilt: 844 (1.4%) Quota: 12,169 Turnout: 61,688 (63.5%)

=== 1997 general election ===
1997 general election: Carlow–Kilkenny
Party	Candidate	FPv%	Count							
Party	Candidate	FPv%	1	2	3	4	5	6	7	8
Fianna Fáil	Liam Aylward	21.0	11,849							
Fine Gael	Phil Hogan	17.1	9,642							
Fine Gael	John Browne	12.1	6,834	6,921	6,974	7,075	7,774	7,930	8,444	9,378
Fianna Fáil	John McGuinness	10.6	5,990	7,252	7,322	7,447	7,483	7,496	8,776	9,310
Fianna Fáil	M. J. Nolan	10.6	5,975	6,462	6,568	6,663	7,033	7,036	7,897	8,548
Labour	Séamus Pattison	9.9	5,578	5,746	5,784	5,860	7,425	7,467	7,782	9,026
Progressive Democrats	Jim Gibbons Jnr	5.6	3,184	3,468	3,501	3,623	3,738	3,749		
Green	Mary White	5.5	3,116	3,197	3,242	3,501	3,742	3,750	4,253	
Labour	Jim Townsend	5.3	2,995	3,007	3,073	3,102				
National Party	Michael Anthony Quinn	1.5	870	883	900					
Independent	Billy Nolan	0.7	416	462						
Electorate: 85,096 Valid: 56,449 Spoilt: 691 (1.2%) Quota: 9,409 Turnout: 57,140 (67.2%)

=== 1992 general election ===
1992 general election: Carlow–Kilkenny
Party	Candidate	FPv%	Count					
Party	Candidate	FPv%	1	2	3	4	5	6
Labour	Séamus Pattison	24.6	13,713					
Fianna Fáil	Liam Aylward	20.3	11,331					
Fianna Fáil	M. J. Nolan	12.9	7,195	7,605	7,878	8,339	8,402	8,965
Fine Gael	Phil Hogan	11.8	6,573	7,686	7,804	8,003	9,497	
Fine Gael	John Browne	11.6	6,471	7,273	7,319	7,375	8,003	9,227
Fianna Fáil	Kevin Fennelly	7.3	4,059	4,532	5,781	6,578	6,815	7,637
Independent	Miriam Hogan	4.7	2,596	3,602	3,676	3,883	4,111	
Fine Gael	Andy Cotterell	4.2	2,358	2,721	2,795	2,823		
Fianna Fáil	Evelyn White	2.6	1,462	1,714	1,917			
Electorate: 81,377 Valid: 55,758 Spoilt: 793 (1.4%) Quota: 9,294 Turnout: 56,551 (69.5%)

=== 1989 general election ===
1989 general election: Carlow–Kilkenny
Party	Candidate	FPv%	Count						
Party	Candidate	FPv%	1	2	3	4	5	6	7
Fianna Fáil	Liam Aylward	18.6	10,161						
Labour	Séamus Pattison	17.6	9,599						
Fianna Fáil	M. J. Nolan	14.3	7,798	7,883	8,096	8,307	8,406	8,450	8,543
Fine Gael	John Browne	12.0	6,526	6,616	6,642	7,225	8,499	9,826	
Fine Gael	Phil Hogan	11.8	6,431	6,611	6,666	7,929	10,528		
Fianna Fáil	Pat Millea	10.9	5,950	6,059	6,714	7,082	7,254	7,322	7,513
Fine Gael	Andy Cotterell	7.0	3,839	3,914	3,980	4,470			
Progressive Democrats	Martin Gibbons	5.6	3,068	3,263	3,320				
Workers' Party	Liam Quigley	2.1	1,159						
Electorate: 79,073 Valid: 54,531 Spoilt: 736 (1.3%) Quota: 9,089 Turnout: 55,267 (69.9%)

=== 1987 general election ===
1987 general election: Carlow–Kilkenny
Party	Candidate	FPv%	Count						
Party	Candidate	FPv%	1	2	3	4	5	6	7
Fianna Fáil	Liam Aylward	18.7	10,773						
Fianna Fáil	M. J. Nolan	16.2	9,319	9,529	9,634				
Labour	Séamus Pattison	12.8	7,358	7,423	8,061	8,418	8,962	10,347	
Fianna Fáil	Pat Millea	9.5	5,435	6,155	6,350	6,493	6,592		
Fine Gael	Phil Hogan	9.4	5,376	5,406	5,479	5,593	6,700	7,420	
Fine Gael	Kieran Crotty	8.9	5,107	5,153	5,244	5,370	7,883	8,303	8,444
Progressive Democrats	Martin Gibbons	7.8	4,511	4,569	4,766	6,782	7,353	8,113	8,322
Fine Gael	John Browne	7.6	4,390	4,409	4,445	5,221			
Progressive Democrats	Michael Kearns	6.2	3,552	3,566	3,675				
Workers' Party	Joseph Butler	2.9	1,664	1,694					
Electorate: 78,410 Valid: 57,485 Spoilt: Quota: 9,581 Turnout: 73.3%

=== November 1982 general election ===
November 1982 general election: Carlow–Kilkenny
Party	Candidate	FPv%	Count										
Party	Candidate	FPv%	1	2	3	4	5	6	7	8	9	10	11
Fianna Fáil	Liam Aylward	16.6	9,291	9,297	9,336								
Fine Gael	Kieran Crotty	15.0	8,377	8,379	8,447	8,528	8,578	8,842	9,288	9,293	11,205		
Fianna Fáil	Jim Gibbons	12.6	7,032	7,038	7,101	7,894	7,990	8,353	8,407	8,426	8,542	8,573	8,668
Fianna Fáil	M. J. Nolan	12.5	6,998	7,006	7,178	7,660	7,977	8,134	8,390	8,397	8,818	8,847	8,940
Fine Gael	Dick Dowling	10.1	5,661	5,664	5,693	5,719	5,754	5,972	6,324	6,324	8,844	10,478	
Labour	Séamus Pattison	10.1	5,642	5,644	5,744	5,836	6,914	7,859	8,098	8,099	8,463	8,568	9,557
Fine Gael	Joseph Manning	6.2	3,436	3,440	3,519	3,535	3,759	3,797	5,467	5,470			
Fine Gael	Harry Slattery	4.8	2,665	2,665	2,937	2,942	3,026	3,109					
Workers' Party	Seán Walsh	3.9	2,189	2,193	2,298	2,343	2,390						
Labour	Michael Meaney	3.3	1,869	1,870	1,950	1,962							
Fianna Fáil	Mick Lanigan	2.8	1,558	1,566	1,572								
Independent	Eileen Brophy	1.8	1,021	1,039									
Independent	Patrick Jones	0.1	65										
Electorate: 74,064 Valid: 55,804 Spoilt: Quota: 9,301 Turnout: 75.3%

=== February 1982 general election ===
February 1982 general election: Carlow–Kilkenny
Party	Candidate	FPv%	Count											
Party	Candidate	FPv%	1	2	3	4	5	6	7	8	9	10	11	12
Fianna Fáil	Jim Gibbons	16.4	8,910	8,927	9,099									
Fianna Fáil	Liam Aylward	16.3	8,844	8,853	8,966	9,478								
Fine Gael	Kieran Crotty	14.5	7,869	7,878	7,898	7,995	8,026	8,150	8,387	8,747	12,154			
Fianna Fáil	Tom Nolan	12.0	6,529	6,542	6,885	7,048	7,401	7,560	7,840	8,025	8,129	8,158	8,207	8,246
Labour	Séamus Pattison	10.3	5,565	5,570	5,583	5,665	5,685	6,394	7,071	7,168	7,701	8,145	8,148	9,071
Fine Gael	Desmond Governey	8.6	4,663	4,682	4,730	4,738	4,738	5,115	5,192	6,370	7,375	10,009		
Fine Gael	Dick Dowling	8.3	4,506	4,512	4,521	4,524	4,526	4,588	4,834	5,285				
Fine Gael	Michael Deering	4.1	2,220	2,225	2,251	2,256	2,260	2,333	2,358					
Sinn Féin The Workers' Party	Seán Walsh	3.2	1,753	1,775	1,785	1,821	1,839	1,909						
Labour	Eileen Brophy	2.8	1,544	1,560	1,604	1,611	1,614							
Fianna Fáil	John McGuinness	1.7	907	909	938									
Fianna Fáil	Patrick Carpenter	1.5	834	841										
Independent	Peter McCormack	0.2	137											
Electorate: 72,148 Valid: 54,281 Spoilt: 668 (1.2%) Quota: 9,047 Turnout: 54,949 (76.2%)

=== 1981 general election ===
1981 general election: Carlow–Kilkenny
Party	Candidate	FPv%	Count										
Party	Candidate	FPv%	1	2	3	4	5	6	7	8	9	10	11
Fianna Fáil	Liam Aylward	16.6	9,374	9,569									
Fine Gael	Kieran Crotty	14.6	8,285	8,324	8,334	8,487	9,267	9,271	9,577				
Fianna Fáil	Tom Nolan	12.7	7,080	7,563	7,659	7,760	7,892	7,935	8,623	8,713	8,762	8,834	8,883
Fianna Fáil	Jim Gibbons	10.9	6,177	6,298	6,318	6,490	6,540	6,626	8,164	8,478	8,581	8,731	8,860
Labour	Séamus Pattison	10.8	6,095	6,104	6,853	7,547	7,631	7,634	7,895	8,720	9,931		
Fine Gael	Desmond Governey	10.1	5,669	5,763	5,935	6,020	7,183	7,184	7,211	10,762			
Fine Gael	Dick Dowling	7.8	4,447	4,465	4,694	4,794	5,102	5,103	5,141				
Fianna Fáil	Mick Lanigan	4.7	2,708	2,755	2,765	2,887	2,901	2,933					
Fine Gael	John Browne	4.3	2,421	2,449	2,535	2,573							
Sinn Féin The Workers' Party	Seán Walsh	3.3	1,881	1,892	1,932								
Labour	Jim Townsend	2.1	1,178	1,189									
Fianna Fáil	Patrick Carpenter	1.9	1,176										
Electorate: 72,148 Valid: 56,435 Spoilt: 798 (1.4%) Quota: 9,399 Turnout: 57,233 (79.3%)

=== 1977 general election ===
1977 general election: Carlow–Kilkenny
Party	Candidate	FPv%	Count									
Party	Candidate	FPv%	1	2	3	4	5	6	7	8	9	10
Fianna Fáil	Tom Nolan	15.1	8,376	8,402	8,410	8,584	8,648	8,661	10,080			
Fianna Fáil	Jim Gibbons	14.7	8,143	8,182	8,207	8,219	8,336	8,422	8,795	11,094		
Fine Gael	Kieran Crotty	12.8	7,119	7,242	7,887	7,920	8,061	9,258				
Fianna Fáil	Liam Aylward	11.4	6,317	6,352	6,384	6,397	6,851	6,878	7,292	8,805	10,478	
Labour	Séamus Pattison	11.3	6,276	6,375	6,480	7,399	7,891	8,088	8,134	8,599	8,759	8,963
Fine Gael	Desmond Governey	10.8	5,990	6,035	6,190	6,378	6,428	6,627	6,898	6,964	6,986	7,033
Fianna Fáil	Mick Lanigan	7.4	4,126	4,208	4,221	4,232	4,330	4,358	4,520			
Fianna Fáil	Patrick Carpenter	4.8	2,673	2,695	2,697	2,724	2,772	2,776				
Sinn Féin The Workers' Party	Seán Walsh	3.0	1,666	1,705	1,722	1,749						
Fine Gael	Thomas Coogan	2.7	1,510	1,541	1,748	1,765	1,788					
Labour	John McNally	2.6	1,430	1,444	1,453							
Fine Gael	Peter O'Hanrahan	2.2	1,214	1,225								
Independent	John Bolger	1.1	589									
Electorate: 70,136 Valid: 55,429 Quota: 9,239 Turnout: 79.0%

=== 1973 general election ===
1973 general election: Carlow–Kilkenny
Party	Candidate	FPv%	Count							
Party	Candidate	FPv%	1	2	3	4	5	6	7	8
Fine Gael	Kieran Crotty	15.7	7,343	7,349	7,947					
Fianna Fáil	Jim Gibbons	15.3	7,128	7,224	7,238	7,265	7,266	7,504	7,564	7,588
Fianna Fáil	Tom Nolan	15.2	7,098	7,899						
Fine Gael	Desmond Governey	14.9	6,953	7,025	7,222	7,650	7,723	9,394		
Fianna Fáil	Bob Aylward	14.2	6,618	6,775	6,822	6,858	6,861	6,946	6,990	7,011
Labour	Séamus Pattison	11.3	5,300	5,317	5,480	6,416	6,429	6,886	6,894	7,878
Fine Gael	Thomas Coogan	5.1	2,362	2,364	2,535	2,564	2,634			
Labour	John McManamy	3.2	1,488	1,511	1,528					
Fine Gael	Michael Wall	2.6	1,222	1,222						
Fianna Fáil	Liam Murphy	2.6	1,205							
Electorate: 59,415 Valid: 46,717 Quota: 7,787 Turnout: 78.6%

=== 1969 general election ===
1969 general election: Carlow–Kilkenny
Party	Candidate	FPv%	Count					
Party	Candidate	FPv%	1	2	3	4	5	6
Fianna Fáil	Tom Nolan	17.6	8,090					
Fianna Fáil	Jim Gibbons	16.9	7,771					
Fianna Fáil	Bob Aylward	13.6	6,273	6,586	6,655	6,710	6,832	6,862
Fine Gael	Desmond Governey	13.3	6,146	6,189	6,347	6,646	7,355	8,040
Labour	Séamus Pattison	13.1	6,041	6,062	6,169	7,640	7,761	
Fine Gael	Kieran Crotty	12.7	5,863	5,870	6,765	6,796	8,394	
Fine Gael	James Keeffe	4.9	2,251	2,253	2,654	2,675		
Labour	John McManamy	4.2	1,946	1,968	1,984			
Fine Gael	Thomas Hogan	3.7	1,692	1,695				
Electorate: 58,645 Valid: 46,073 Quota: 7,679 Turnout: 78.6%

=== 1965 general election ===
1965 general election: Carlow–Kilkenny
Party	Candidate	FPv%	Count							
Party	Candidate	FPv%	1	2	3	4	5	6	7	8
Fianna Fáil	Tom Nolan	17.4	7,805							
Labour	Séamus Pattison	14.1	6,299	6,316	6,322	6,376	8,343			
Fine Gael	Patrick Crotty	13.7	6,114	6,118	6,154	8,152				
Fianna Fáil	Jim Gibbons	13.1	5,865	5,922	5,939	5,986	6,040	6,062	8,065	
Fianna Fáil	Bob Aylward	11.2	4,996	5,026	5,055	5,109	5,161	5,174	6,166	6,252
Fine Gael	Desmond Governey	10.6	4,741	4,771	4,787	5,255	5,623	6,277	6,402	6,978
Fianna Fáil	Martin Medlar	7.4	3,305	3,482	3,503	3,550	3,690	3,694		
Labour	John Moriarty	6.2	2,767	2,795	2,801	2,832				
Fine Gael	Matthew Byrne	6.0	2,684	2,687	2,722					
Independent	Charles B. Cummins	0.4	175	175						
Electorate: 58,026 Valid: 44,751 Quota: 7,459 Turnout: 77.1%

=== 1961 general election ===
1961 general election: Carlow–Kilkenny
Party	Candidate	FPv%	Count								
Party	Candidate	FPv%	1	2	3	4	5	6	7	8	9
Fine Gael	Patrick Crotty	17.2	7,434								
Fine Gael	Desmond Governey	12.4	5,343	5,500	5,848	7,263					
Fianna Fáil	Martin Medlar	11.6	5,009	5,013	5,132	5,180	5,305	5,936	6,188	7,807	
Fianna Fáil	Tom Nolan	10.8	4,666	4,667	4,802	4,821	5,019	5,101	5,715	5,980	6,084
Labour	Séamus Pattison	9.5	4,116	4,132	4,262	4,448	5,475	6,007	6,586	6,951	6,999
Fianna Fáil	Jim Gibbons	9.4	4,046	4,057	4,148	4,200	4,329	4,922	5,014	5,901	6,365
Fianna Fáil	Patrick Teehan	7.1	3,072	3,076	3,093	3,145	3,173	3,349	3,423		
Independent	John Moriarty	5.4	2,350	2,352	2,516	2,549	2,685	2,727			
Fianna Fáil	Michael J. McGuinness	4.8	2,056	2,063	2,096	2,119	2,162				
Fine Gael	Francis O'Brien	4.4	1,891	1,922	1,948						
Labour	John Fahey	3.9	1,674	1,679	1,956	1,979					
National Progressive Democrats	Kathleen Brady	3.4	1,484	1,489							
Electorate: 57,784 Valid: 43,141 Quota: 7,191 Turnout: 74.7%

=== 1960 by-election ===
Fine Gael TD Joseph Hughes died on 20 January 1960. A by-election was held on 23 June 1960. The Elections Act 1960 enabled the election to be held the same day as the 1960 local elections, using the same administrative apparatus.

1960 by-election: Carlow–Kilkenny
Party	Candidate	FPv%	Count	
Party	Candidate	FPv%	1	2
Fianna Fáil	Patrick Teehan	40.7	15,515	17,555
Fine Gael	Desmond Governey	39.1	14,892	17,426
Labour	Séamus Pattison	20.2	7,678	
Electorate: 55,848 Valid: 38,085 Quota: 19,043 Turnout: 68.2%

=== 1957 general election ===
1957 general election: Carlow–Kilkenny
Party	Candidate	FPv%	Count									
Party	Candidate	FPv%	1	2	3	4	5	6	7	8	9	10
Fianna Fáil	Martin Medlar	22.1	9,447									
Fianna Fáil	Jim Gibbons	13.5	5,761	6,431	6,467	6,537	6,578	6,732	6,743	8,504		
Fine Gael	Patrick Crotty	13.4	5,742	5,796	5,881	5,937	7,457					
Fianna Fáil	Francis Humphreys	13.4	5,738	6,466	6,636	6,897	6,915	7,070	7,073	8,435		
Fine Gael	Joseph Hughes	10.3	4,419	4,471	4,616	4,812	5,035	5,208	5,456	5,587	5,701	5,793
Fianna Fáil	Patrick Teehan	7.1	3,042	3,617	3,670	3,693	3,714	3,982	3,985			
Labour	Herbert Devoy	4.7	1,992	2,037	2,141	2,882	2,946	4,271	4,338	4,485	4,662	4,799
Fine Gael	William Cotterell	4.5	1,929	1,939	1,953	1,960						
Labour	James Pattison	4.4	1,900	1,996	2,187	2,501	2,529					
Labour	John Fahey	4.1	1,739	1,781	1,875							
Clann na Poblachta	John Moriarty	2.4	1,037	1,087								
Electorate: 58,216 Valid: 42,746 Quota: 7,125 Turnout: 73.4%

Francis Humphreys died on 19 April 1961.

=== 1956 by-election ===
Fianna Fáil TD Thomas Walsh died on 14 July 1956. A by-election was held on 14 November 1956, which was won by Fianna Fáil candidate Martin Medlar.

1956 by-election: Carlow–Kilkenny
Party	Candidate	FPv%	Count	
Party	Candidate	FPv%	1	2
Fianna Fáil	Martin Medlar	57.8	23,782	
Fine Gael	Thomas Fielding	28.6	11,752	13,137
Labour	Herbert Devoy	13.7	5,617	7,438
Electorate: 58,216 Valid: 41,151 Quota: 20,576 Turnout: 70.7%

=== 1954 general election ===
1954 general election: Carlow–Kilkenny
Party	Candidate	FPv%	Count					
Party	Candidate	FPv%	1	2	3	4	5	6
Fianna Fáil	Thomas Walsh	21.6	9,948					
Fine Gael	Patrick Crotty	18.4	8,492					
Fianna Fáil	Thomas Derrig	13.4	6,164	7,481	7,522	7,571	7,639	7,717
Labour	James Pattison	12.0	5,522	5,683	6,371	6,438	7,447	7,644
Fianna Fáil	Francis Humphreys	11.3	5,216	5,838	5,903	5,911	6,506	6,577
Fine Gael	Joseph Hughes	10.9	5,053	5,134	5,226	5,473	5,974	8,468
Fine Gael	Thomas Fielding	5.2	2,413	2,445	2,476	2,897	2,948	
Independent	William Nolan	4.9	2,248	2,272	2,448	2,454		
Labour	Daniel Maguire	2.4	1,106	1,123				
Electorate: 58,947 Valid: 46,162 Quota: 7,694 Turnout: 78.3%

Thomas Derrig died on 19 November 1956. The seat remained vacant until the dissolution of the 15th Dáil on 12 February 1957.

=== 1951 general election ===
1951 general election: Carlow–Kilkenny
Party	Candidate	FPv%	Count						
Party	Candidate	FPv%	1	2	3	4	5	6	7
Fianna Fáil	Thomas Walsh	18.9	8,701						
Fine Gael	Patrick Crotty	17.2	7,901						
Fianna Fáil	Thomas Derrig	17.1	7,890						
Fianna Fáil	Francis Humphreys	12.5	5,758	6,590	6,593	6,707	6,749	7,292	7,485
Fine Gael	Joseph Hughes	11.1	5,132	5,180	5,262	5,462	7,029	7,882	
Labour	James Pattison	9.9	4,551	4,649	4,666	5,211	5,342	7,104	7,121
Labour	Thomas Hayden	6.6	3,056	3,069	3,072	3,329	3,440		
Fine Gael	Thomas Fielding	3.7	1,703	1,721	1,828	1,993			
Clann na Poblachta	Patrick Gleeson	3.0	1,384	1,396	1,405				
Electorate: 60,522 Valid: 46,076 Quota: 7,680 Turnout: 76.1%

=== 1948 general election ===
The poll was postponed from 2 February to 10 February due to the death of outgoing Fine Gael TD Eamonn Coogan during the campaign.

1948 general election: Carlow–Kilkenny
Party	Candidate	FPv%	Count										
Party	Candidate	FPv%	1	2	3	4	5	6	7	8	9	10	11
Fianna Fáil	Thomas Derrig	19.3	8,787										
Fine Gael	Joseph Hughes	13.3	6,055	6,085	6,118	6,151	6,178	6,216	6,585	6,631	7,174	8,012	
Fine Gael	Patrick Crotty	11.9	5,438	5,449	5,477	5,555	5,665	5,762	6,840	6,913	7,102	7,884	
National Labour Party	James Pattison	10.3	4,707	4,786	5,060	5,152	5,326	5,432	5,464	5,634	5,882	6,591	6,749
Fianna Fáil	Thomas Walsh	9.8	4,468	4,800	4,804	4,819	4,896	4,932	4,945	6,119	6,227	6,451	6,520
Fianna Fáil	Francis Humphreys	9.4	4,301	4,719	4,770	4,785	4,827	4,837	4,848	5,155	5,614	5,987	6,104
Clann na Poblachta	Michael J. Barry	6.1	2,797	2,803	2,838	3,090	3,156	4,257	4,299	4,315	5,151		
Labour	Patrick Bergin	5.6	2,537	2,541	2,570	2,577	2,906	2,944	2,956	2,958			
Fine Gael	David Burke	3.4	1,543	1,546	1,549	1,557	1,588	1,622					
Fianna Fáil	Joseph Rice	3.3	1,506	1,773	1,782	1,802	1,822	1,838	1,840				
Clann na Poblachta	Charles Sheehan	2.6	1,186	1,189	1,190	1,466	1,555						
Labour	William J. Cleere	2.2	991	998	1,026	1,042							
Clann na Poblachta	Patrick Gleeson	1.8	809	824	831								
National Labour Party	Stephen Carroll	1.2	527	530									
Electorate: 61,031 Valid: 45,652 Quota: 7,609 Turnout: 74.8%

=== 1933 general election ===
1933 general election: Carlow–Kilkenny
Party	Candidate	FPv%	Count						
Party	Candidate	FPv%	1	2	3	4	5	6	7
Fianna Fáil	Thomas Derrig	19.5	10,022						
Labour	James Pattison	13.3	6,833	6,913	6,955	7,027	7,913	11,321	
Fianna Fáil	Seán Gibbons	12.0	6,167	7,317	7,368	7,437	12,080		
Cumann na nGaedheal	Desmond FitzGerald	11.9	6,078	6,110	6,224	8,718			
Fianna Fáil	Francis Humphreys	10.9	5,614	5,727	5,799	5,853			
Cumann na nGaedheal	Edward Dundon	10.3	5,293	5,366	5,486	6,152	6,238	6,271	6,311
National Centre Party	Richard Holohan	9.8	5,029	5,043	5,971	7,462	7,538	7,628	7,738
Cumann na nGaedheal	Denis Gorey	9.4	4,801	4,809	4,907				
National Centre Party	James Murphy	2.8	1,453	1,456					
Electorate: 61,464 Valid: 51,290 Quota: 8,549 Turnout: 83.5%

=== 1932 general election ===
1932 general election: Carlow–Kilkenny
Party	Candidate	FPv%	Count						
Party	Candidate	FPv%	1	2	3	4	5	6	7
Fianna Fáil	Thomas Derrig	25.2	11,848						
Cumann na nGaedheal	Desmond FitzGerald	18.4	8,672						
Fianna Fáil	Seán Gibbons	10.1	4,749	7,904					
Fianna Fáil	Francis Humphreys	9.8	4,629	5,015	5,021	5,086	5,288	6,179	8,147
Cumann na nGaedheal	James Hughes	9.1	4,272	4,306	4,419	4,512	5,092	5,651	6,050
Labour	James Pattison	8.7	4,105	4,254	4,291	4,310	4,436	4,931	
Cumann na nGaedheal	Denis Gorey	6.0	2,799	2,847	3,421	3,508	5,150	5,658	
Independent	Edward Doyle	5.4	2,540	2,702	2,728	3,041	3,149		
Independent	Thomas Bolger	1.5	718	736	743				
Electorate: 60,576 Valid: 47,020 Quota: 7,837 Turnout: 77.6%

=== 1927 by-election ===
W. T. Cosgrave was also elected for Cork Borough. He resigned his seat in Carlow–Kilkenny following the election. A by-election was held on 3 November 1927.

1927 by-election: Carlow–Kilkenny
Party	Candidate	FPv%	Count
Party	Candidate	FPv%	1
Cumann na nGaedheal	Denis Gorey	50.3	23,007
Fianna Fáil	Michael Shelly	49.7	22,734
Electorate: 61,724 Valid: 45,741 Quota: 22,871 Turnout: 74.1%

=== September 1927 general election ===
September 1927 general election: Carlow–Kilkenny
Party	Candidate	FPv%	Count					
Party	Candidate	FPv%	1	2	3	4	5	6
Cumann na nGaedheal	W. T. Cosgrave	32.4	13,949					
Fianna Fáil	Thomas Derrig	23.0	9,891					
Labour	Edward Doyle	11.5	4,956	5,535	6,052	6,846	7,015	7,097
Farmers' Party	Richard Holohan	10.7	4,599	5,247	5,328	5,427	6,767	8,005
Fianna Fáil	Michael Delaney	7.5	3,229	3,710	5,703	5,872	5,958	5,985
Cumann na nGaedheal	Denis Gorey	5.9	2,541	4,471	4,492	4,582		
Cumann na nGaedheal	Peter de Loughry	5.8	2,516	5,529	5,573	5,824	8,519	
Independent	Joseph Reade	3.1	1,348	1,474	1,537			
Electorate: 61,724 Valid: 43,029 Quota: 7,172 Turnout: 69.7%

Peter de Loughry died on 23 October 1931. The seat remained vacant until the dissolution of the 6th Dáil on 29 January 1932.

=== June 1927 general election ===
June 1927 general election: Carlow–Kilkenny
Party	Candidate	FPv%	Count									
Party	Candidate	FPv%	1	2	3	4	5	6	7	8	9	10
Cumann na nGaedheal	W. T. Cosgrave	31.4	13,272									
Fianna Fáil	Thomas Derrig	12.8	5,407	5,508	5,514	6,314	6,531	8,918				
Labour	Edward Doyle	12.0	5,060	6,052	6,216	6,397	6,789	7,002	7,294			
Farmers' Party	Richard Holohan	8.7	3,695	4,325	4,370	4,396	4,594	4,758	5,076	5,101	7,562	
Farmers' Party	Arthur MacMurrough-Kavanagh	7.8	3,276	3,774	4,040	4,159	4,436	4,513	4,587	4,597		
Labour	Edward Wall	7.3	3,096	3,331	3,387	3,438	4,113	4,570	4,950	5,099	5,446	5,540
Fianna Fáil	Michael Shelly	7.0	2,961	2,998	3,035	3,452	3,621					
National League	John Magennis	5.0	2,096	2,246	2,258	2,275						
Fianna Fáil	Edward McDonald	3.9	1,653	1,705	1,729							
Cumann na nGaedheal	Denis Gorey	2.3	954	3,877	4,557	4,584	4,699	4,755	4,782	4,783	5,442	5,871
Cumann na nGaedheal	John Nolan	1.8	761	1,376								
Electorate: 61,724 Valid: 42,231 Quota: 7,039 Turnout: 68.4%

=== 1925 by-election ===
Seán Gibbons, a National Group TD who had been elected for Cumann na nGaedheal, resigned on 30 October 1924. A by-election was held on 11 March 1925.

1925 by-election: Carlow–Kilkenny
Party	Candidate	FPv%	Count
Party	Candidate	FPv%	1
Cumann na nGaedheal	Thomas Bolger	58.9	24,142
Republican	Michael Barry	41.1	16,830
Electorate: 63,112 Valid: 40,972 Quota: 20,487 Turnout: 64.9%

=== 1923 general election ===
1923 general election: Carlow–Kilkenny
Party	Candidate	FPv%	Count						
Party	Candidate	FPv%	1	2	3	4	5	6	7
Cumann na nGaedheal	W. T. Cosgrave	44.1	17,709						
Republican	Michael Shelly	14.0	5,641	5,733	5,922	5,937	5,965	6,017	6,094
Labour	Edward Doyle	11.9	4,783	6,066	6,302	6,412	6,496	6,919	
Republican	Michael Barry	10.8	4,355	4,457	4,697	4,770	4,866	4,960	5,033
Farmers' Party	Denis Gorey	9.2	3,702	6,007	6,089	7,693			
Farmers' Party	Edward Broughan	4.6	1,830	2,197	2,225				
Independent	Patrick Gaffney	2.0	803	1,028					
Cumann na nGaedheal	Thomas Bolger	1.8	723	2,712	2,767	2,932	3,283		
Cumann na nGaedheal	Seán Gibbons	1.5	615	5,267	5,386	5,485	5,846	7,950	
Electorate: 62,937 Valid: 40,161 Quota: 6,694 Turnout: 63.8%

=== 1922 general election ===
1922 general election: Carlow–Kilkenny
Party	Candidate	FPv%	Count			
Party	Candidate	FPv%	1	2	3	4
Labour	Patrick Gaffney	34.8	10,875			
Sinn Féin (Pro-Treaty)	W. T. Cosgrave	22.6	7,071			
Farmers' Party	Denis Gorey	19.6	6,122	6,591		
Sinn Féin (Anti-Treaty)	Edward Aylward	10.8	3,365	4,368	5,098	5,154
Sinn Féin (Pro-Treaty)	Gearóid O'Sullivan	8.6	2,681	5,111	5,711	6,480
Sinn Féin (Anti-Treaty)	James Lennon	3.6	1,113	1,840		
Electorate: 51,012 Valid: 31,227 Quota: 6,246 Turnout: 61.2%

=== 1921 general election ===
1921 general election: Carlow–Kilkenny (uncontested)
Party	Candidate
Sinn Féin	Edward Aylward
Sinn Féin	W. T. Cosgrave
Sinn Féin	James Lennon
Sinn Féin	Gearóid O'Sullivan

== See also ==
- Dáil constituencies
- Elections in the Republic of Ireland
- Politics of the Republic of Ireland
- List of Dáil by-elections
- List of political parties in the Republic of Ireland
