= Catherine Callaghan (politician) =

Irish politician

Catherine Callaghan TD
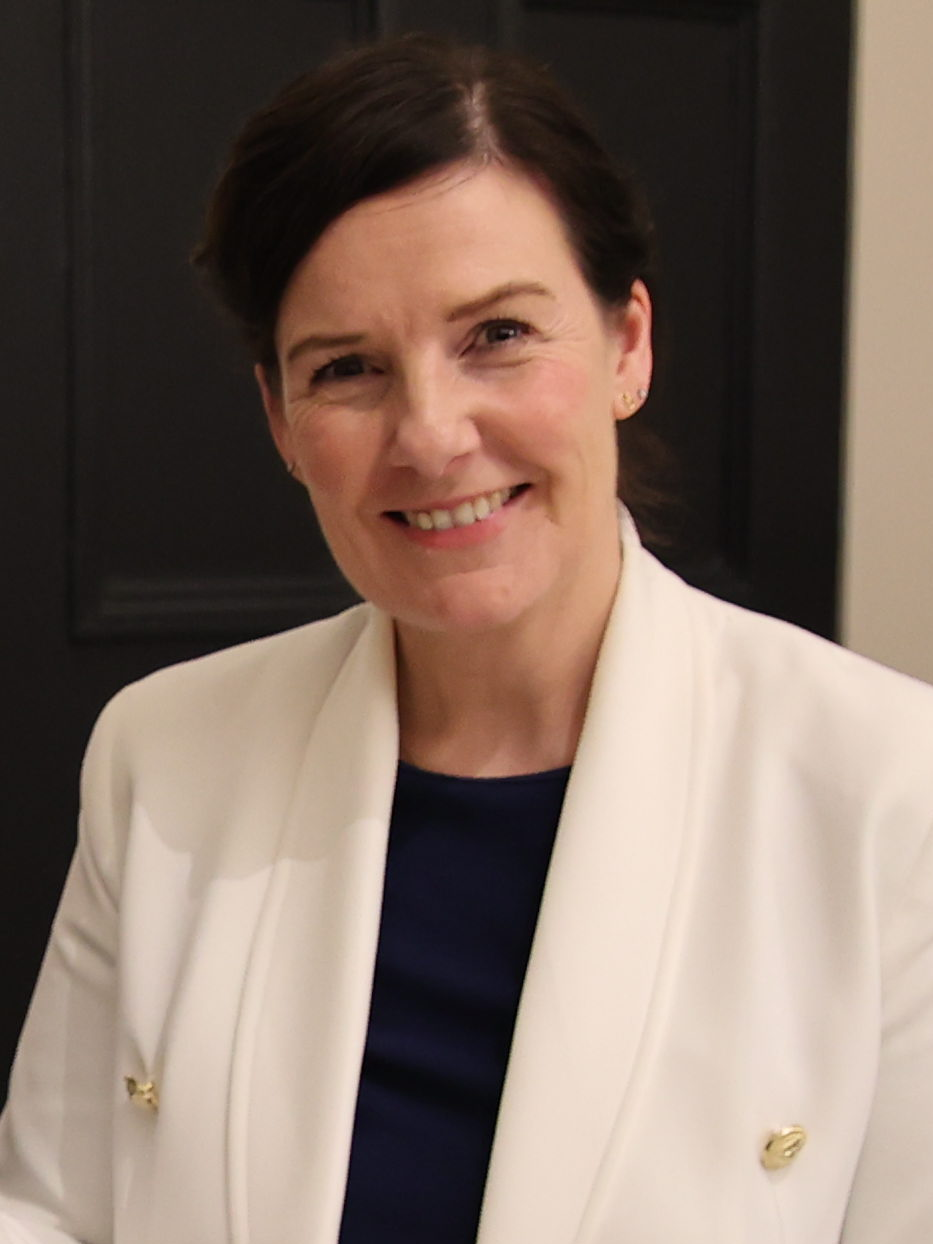
- Callaghan in 2024

Teachta Dála
- Incumbent
- Assumed office November 2024
- Constituency: Carlow–Kilkenny

Personal details
- Born: 1974/1975 (age 50–51)
- Party: Fine Gael
- Children: 3

Catherine Callaghan (born 1974/1975) is an Irish politician who serves as a Teachta Dála (TD) for the Carlow–Kilkenny constituency since the 2024 general election. She is the first female member of Fine Gael to represent the constituency.

== Early life ==
Callaghan was a member of the Defence Forces and served in the Lebanon during her six years of service in the Irish Air Corps. She is a farmer and business owner who also works as a special needs assistant.

== Career ==
At the 2024 Irish local elections Callaghan ran for a seat on Carlow County Council, but lost by one vote. It was the first elected office that Callaghan sought.

At the 2024 general election Callaghan was elected to the Dáil for the Carlow–Kilkenny constituency. She was the first woman nominated by Fine Gael in the constituency. The party membership selected her as a candidate at the party convention over Pat Deering, a former TD. She was the only Fine Gael candidate from County Carlow.

During Callaghan's time in the Dáil, she has served on the Defence and National Security, and the Justice, Home Affairs, and Migration committees. She is the chair of the Members' Interests committee.

== Political positions ==
Callaghan is critical of Ireland's triple lock system and states that it allows for Russia to veto Irish participation in peacekeeping missions, with no missions being approved by the United Nations Security Council from 2014 to 2025. Callaghan supports creating a national day of appreciation for the Defence Forces.

== Personal life ==
Callaghan is the mother of three children.

== Works cited ==
=== News ===
- Bolton-Dowling, Aisling (27 November 2024). "Carlow-Kilkenny Election 2024: Who are the candidates in my constituency?". Irish Independent. Archived from the original on 18 June 2025.
- Bolton-Dowling, Aisling (19 September 2024). "Former Irish Defence Forces member calls for appreciation day to recognise members' service". Irish Independent. Archived from the original on 18 June 2025.
- Bolton-Dowling, Aisling (19 July 2024). "History made as Fine Gael select first ever female candidate in Carlow-Kilkenny for general election". Irish Independent. Archived from the original on 18 June 2025.
- Cox, James (7 June 2025). "'Putin shouldn't have a veto': TD says triple lock debate must avoid misinformation". BreakingNews.ie. Archived from the original on 18 June 2025.
- Gataveckaite, Gabija (24 April 2025). "The backbench Government TDs and Opposition deputies being assigned €10,000 Oireachtas jobs". Irish Independent. Archived from the original on 18 June 2025.
- Pender, Suzanne (3 December 2024). "Carlow-Kilkenny: Catherine Callaghan (FG)". The Irish Times. Archived from the original on 18 June 2025.

=== Web ===
- "Catherine Callaghan". Oireachtas. Archived from the original on 18 June 2025.
- "Catherine Callaghan, TD". Fine Gael. Archived from the original on 18 June 2025.

| Dáil | Election | Deputy (Party) | Deputy (Party) | Deputy (Party) | Deputy (Party) | Deputy (Party) |
|---|---|---|---|---|---|---|
| 2nd | 1921 | Edward Aylward (SF) | W. T. Cosgrave (SF) | James Lennon (SF) | Gearóid O'Sullivan (SF) | 4 seats 1921–1923 |
| 3rd | 1922 | Patrick Gaffney (Lab) | W. T. Cosgrave (PT-SF) | Denis Gorey (FP) | Gearóid O'Sullivan (PT-SF) | 4 seats 1921–1923 |
| 4th | 1923 | Edward Doyle (Lab) | W. T. Cosgrave (CnaG) | Denis Gorey (FP) | Michael Shelly (Rep) | Seán Gibbons (CnaG) |
| 4th | 1925 by-election | Edward Doyle (Lab) | W. T. Cosgrave (CnaG) | Denis Gorey (FP) | Michael Shelly (Rep) | Thomas Bolger (CnaG) |
| 5th | 1927 (Jun) | Edward Doyle (Lab) | W. T. Cosgrave (CnaG) | Denis Gorey (CnaG) | Thomas Derrig (FF) | Richard Holohan (FP) |
| 6th | 1927 (Sep) | Edward Doyle (Lab) | W. T. Cosgrave (CnaG) | Peter de Loughry (CnaG) | Thomas Derrig (FF) | Richard Holohan (FP) |
| 6th | 1927 by-election | Edward Doyle (Lab) | Denis Gorey (CnaG) | Peter de Loughry (CnaG) | Thomas Derrig (FF) | Richard Holohan (FP) |
| 7th | 1932 | Francis Humphreys (FF) | Denis Gorey (CnaG) | Desmond FitzGerald (CnaG) | Thomas Derrig (FF) | Seán Gibbons (FF) |
| 8th | 1933 | James Pattison (Lab) | Richard Holohan (NCP) | Desmond FitzGerald (CnaG) | Thomas Derrig (FF) | Seán Gibbons (FF) |
| 9th | 1937 | Constituency abolished. See Kilkenny and Carlow–Kildare | | | | |

| Dáil | Election | Deputy (Party) | Deputy (Party) | Deputy (Party) | Deputy (Party) | Deputy (Party) |
|---|---|---|---|---|---|---|
| 13th | 1948 | James Pattison (NLP) | Thomas Walsh (FF) | Thomas Derrig (FF) | Joseph Hughes (FG) | Patrick Crotty (FG) |
| 14th | 1951 | Francis Humphreys (FF) | Thomas Walsh (FF) | Thomas Derrig (FF) | Joseph Hughes (FG) | Patrick Crotty (FG) |
| 15th | 1954 | James Pattison (Lab) | Thomas Walsh (FF) | Thomas Derrig (FF) | Joseph Hughes (FG) | Patrick Crotty (FG) |
| 15th | 1956 by-election | James Pattison (Lab) | Martin Medlar (FF) | Thomas Derrig (FF) | Joseph Hughes (FG) | Patrick Crotty (FG) |
| 16th | 1957 | Francis Humphreys (FF) | Martin Medlar (FF) | Jim Gibbons (FF) | Joseph Hughes (FG) | Patrick Crotty (FG) |
| 16th | 1960 by-election | Patrick Teehan (FF) | Martin Medlar (FF) | Jim Gibbons (FF) | Joseph Hughes (FG) | Patrick Crotty (FG) |
| 17th | 1961 | Séamus Pattison (Lab) | Martin Medlar (FF) | Jim Gibbons (FF) | Desmond Governey (FG) | Patrick Crotty (FG) |
| 18th | 1965 | Séamus Pattison (Lab) | Tom Nolan (FF) | Jim Gibbons (FF) | Desmond Governey (FG) | Patrick Crotty (FG) |
| 19th | 1969 | Séamus Pattison (Lab) | Tom Nolan (FF) | Jim Gibbons (FF) | Desmond Governey (FG) | Kieran Crotty (FG) |
| 20th | 1973 | Séamus Pattison (Lab) | Tom Nolan (FF) | Jim Gibbons (FF) | Desmond Governey (FG) | Kieran Crotty (FG) |
| 21st | 1977 | Séamus Pattison (Lab) | Tom Nolan (FF) | Jim Gibbons (FF) | Liam Aylward (FF) | Kieran Crotty (FG) |
| 22nd | 1981 | Séamus Pattison (Lab) | Tom Nolan (FF) | Desmond Governey (FG) | Liam Aylward (FF) | Kieran Crotty (FG) |
| 23rd | 1982 (Feb) | Séamus Pattison (Lab) | Jim Gibbons (FF) | Desmond Governey (FG) | Liam Aylward (FF) | Kieran Crotty (FG) |
| 24th | 1982 (Nov) | Séamus Pattison (Lab) | M. J. Nolan (FF) | Dick Dowling (FG) | Liam Aylward (FF) | Kieran Crotty (FG) |
| 25th | 1987 | Séamus Pattison (Lab) | M. J. Nolan (FF) | Martin Gibbons (PDs) | Liam Aylward (FF) | Kieran Crotty (FG) |
| 26th | 1989 | Séamus Pattison (Lab) | M. J. Nolan (FF) | Phil Hogan (FG) | Liam Aylward (FF) | John Browne (FG) |
| 27th | 1992 | Séamus Pattison (Lab) | M. J. Nolan (FF) | Phil Hogan (FG) | Liam Aylward (FF) | John Browne (FG) |
| 28th | 1997 | Séamus Pattison (Lab) | John McGuinness (FF) | Phil Hogan (FG) | Liam Aylward (FF) | John Browne (FG) |
| 29th | 2002 | Séamus Pattison (Lab) | John McGuinness (FF) | Phil Hogan (FG) | Liam Aylward (FF) | M. J. Nolan (FF) |
| 30th | 2007 | Mary White (GP) | John McGuinness (FF) | Phil Hogan (FG) | Bobby Aylward (FF) | M. J. Nolan (FF) |
| 31st | 2011 | Ann Phelan (Lab) | John McGuinness (FF) | Phil Hogan (FG) | John Paul Phelan (FG) | Pat Deering (FG) |
| 31st | 2015 by-election | Ann Phelan (Lab) | John McGuinness (FF) | Bobby Aylward (FF) | John Paul Phelan (FG) | Pat Deering (FG) |
| 32nd | 2016 | Kathleen Funchion (SF) | John McGuinness (FF) | Bobby Aylward (FF) | John Paul Phelan (FG) | Pat Deering (FG) |
| 33rd | 2020 | Kathleen Funchion (SF) | John McGuinness (FF) | Jennifer Murnane O'Connor (FF) | John Paul Phelan (FG) | Malcolm Noonan (GP) |
| 34th | 2024 | Natasha Newsome Drennan (SF) | John McGuinness (FF) | Jennifer Murnane O'Connor (FF) | Catherine Callaghan (FG) | Peter "Chap" Cleere (FF) |
