= Death of Susie Long =

Death from cancer in Ireland

Susie Long was a 41-year-old woman who died from cancer at Our Lady's Hospice in Harold's Cross, Dublin, on 12 October 2007. Her death followed a long campaign to overhaul cancer treatment services in Ireland's ailing health system. An expatriate from Ohio, U.S., her remains were cremated at Mount Jerome Cemetery. Long's campaign is credited with persuading then Health Minister Mary Harney to provide funding for a new 24-bed day unit at St Luke's Hospital. Taoiseach Bertie Ahern also acknowledged that Long had been failed.

Long first attended her GP in 2005 and was referred for a colonoscopy, which did not take place until February 2006. Using the name "Rosie", she initially came to public attention after telling listeners to Joe Duffy's Liveline in January 2007 that Ireland's "hospital waiting lists" would kill her. Her email told of her seven-month wait for a colonoscopy to diagnose her bowel cancer and compared this with a three-day wait for a private patient in the same condition whom she had spoken with while undergoing chemotherapy.

Susie Long's story featured on an episode of Scannal on RTÉ Television more than three years after her death.

The day unit promised by Mary Harney arrived at the sod-turning stage some 5½ years after Long's death and was named after her.

After her death, the Susie Long Hospice Fund was established. In 2014, the fund announced a new six-bed palliative care unit for St. Luke's Hospital.

Married to Conor Mac Liam, they had two children together. Mac Liam later stood as a candidate in the 2014 Kilkenny County Council election and 2015 Carlow–Kilkenny by-election.
