= Electoral (Amendment) Act 1947 =

Constituencies in use at Dáil elections from 1948 to 1961

Oireachtas
- Long title: AN ACT TO FIX THE NUMBER OF MEMBERS OF DAIL EIREANN AND TO REVISE THEIR CONSTITUENCIES AND TO AMEND THE LAW RELATING TO THE ELECTION OF SUCH MEMBERS.
- Citation: No. 31 of 1947
- Signed: 27 November 1947
- Commenced: 27 November 1947 & 18 February 1948
- Repealed: 15 September 1961

Legislative history
- Bill citation: No. 34 of 1947
- Introduced by: Minister for Local Government (Seán MacEntee)
- Introduced: 4 July 1947

Amends
- Electoral Act 1923

Repeals
- Electoral (Revision of Constituencies) Act 1935

Repealed by
- Electoral (Amendment) Act 1961
- Status: Repealed

The Electoral (Amendment) Act 1947 (No. 31) was a law in Ireland which revised Dáil constituencies. The new constituencies were first used for the 13th Dáil, elected at the 1948 general election on 4 February 1948.

This Act repealed the Electoral (Revision of Constituencies) Act 1935, which defined the constituencies since the 1937 general election. It also increased the number of seats in the Dáil by 9 from 138 to 147. It was used at the 1951, 1954 and 1957 general elections.

The 1947 revision was repealed by the Electoral (Amendment) Act 1961, which created a new schedule of constituencies first used at the 1961 general election for the 17th Dáil.

== Background ==
In 1947 the rapid rise of new party Clann na Poblachta threatened the position of the governing party Fianna Fáil. The government of Éamon de Valera introduced the Act, which increased the size of the Dáil from 138 to 147 and increased the number of three-seat constituencies from fifteen to twenty-two. The result was described by the journalist and historian Tim Pat Coogan as "a blatant attempt at gerrymander which no Six County Unionist could have bettered". The following February, at the 1948 general election, Clann na Poblachta secured ten seats instead of the nineteen they would have received proportional to their national vote. No Dáil constituency has had more than five seats since 1948. The Constitutional Convention's 2013 recommendation to increase proportionality by having larger constituencies was rejected by the Fine Gael–Labour government on the grounds that "the three, four or five seat Dáil constituency arrangement has served the State well since 1948".

== Constituencies 1948–1961 ==
Key to columns

- Constituency: The name of the constituency. Compass points follow the area name in this list, which was not always the case in the official version of the name.
- Created: The year of the election when a constituency of the same name was first defined.
- Seats: The number of TDs elected from the constituency under the Act.
- Change: Change in the number of seats since the last distribution of seats (which took effect in 1937).

Constituency	Created	Seats	Change
Borough constituencies
Cork	1921	5	+ 1
Dublin North-Central	1948	3	+ 3
Dublin North-East	1937	5	+ 2
Dublin North-West	1921	3	− 2
Dublin South-Central	1948	5	+ 5
Dublin South-East	1948	3	+ 5
Dublin South-West	1948	5	+ 5
County constituencies
Carlow–Kilkenny	1948	5	+ 5
Cavan	1921	4	none
Clare	1921	4	− 1
Cork East	1948	3	+ 3
Cork North	1923	3	− 1
Cork South	1948	3	+ 3
Cork West	1923	3	− 2
Donegal East	1937	4	none
Donegal West	1937	3	none
Dublin County	1921	3	− 2
Dún Laoghaire and Rathdown	1948	3	+ 3
Galway North	1948	3	+ 3
Galway South	1948	3	+ 3
Galway West	1937	3	none
Kerry North	1937	4	none
Kerry South	1937	3	none
Kildare	1948	3	+ 3
Leix–Offaly	1921	5	none
Limerick East	1948	4	+ 4
Limerick West	1948	3	+ 3
Longford–Westmeath	1948	5	+ 5
Louth	1923	3	none
Mayo North	1923	3	none
Mayo South	1923	4	− 1
Meath	1948	3	+ 3
Monaghan	1921	3	none
Roscommon	1923	4	+ 1
Sligo–Leitrim	1948	5	+ 5
Tipperary North	1948	3	+ 3
Tipperary South	1948	4	+ 4
Waterford	1923	4	none
Wexford	1921	5	none
Wicklow	1923	3	none

=== Summary of changes ===
This list summarises the changes in representation. It does not address revisions to the boundaries of constituencies.

Constituency	Created	Seats	Change
Athlone–Longford	1937	3	abolished
Carlow–Kildare	1937	3	abolished
Carlow–Kilkenny	1948	5	new constituency
Clare	1921	4	loses 1 seat
Cork Borough	1921	5	gains 1 seat
Cork East	1948	3	new constituency
Cork North	1923	3	loses 1 seat
Cork South	1948	3	new constituency
Cork South-East	1937	3	abolished
Cork West	1923	3	loses 2 seats
Dublin County	1921	3	loses 2 seats
Dublin North-Central	1948	3	new constituency
Dublin North-East	1937	5	gains 2 seats
Dublin North-West	1921	3	loses 2 seats
Dublin South	1921	7	abolished
Dublin South-Central	1948	5	new constituency
Dublin South-East	1948	3	new constituency
Dublin South-West	1948	5	new constituency
Dublin Townships	1937	3	abolished
Dún Laoghaire and Rathdown	1948	3	new constituency
Galway East	1937	4	abolished
Galway North	1948	3	new constituency
Galway South	1948	3	new constituency
Kildare	1948	3	new constituency
Kilkenny	1937	3	abolished
Leitrim	1937	3	abolished
Limerick	1923	7	abolished
Limerick East	1948	4	new constituency
Limerick West	1948	3	new constituency
Longford–Westmeath	1948	5	new constituency
Mayo South	1923	4	loses 1 seat
Meath	1948	3	new constituency
Meath–Westmeath	1937	5	abolished
Roscommon	1923	4	gains 1 seat
Sligo	1937	3	abolished
Sligo–Leitrim	1948	5	new constituency
Tipperary	1923	7	abolished
Tipperary North	1948	3	new constituency
Tipperary South	1948	4	new constituency

== See also ==
- Elections in the Republic of Ireland
