= Electoral (Revision of Constituencies) Act 1935 =

Constituencies in use at Dáil elections from 1937 to 1948

Oireachtas
- Long title: AN ACT TO REVISE, IN PURSUANCE OF ARTICLE 26 OF THE CONSTITUTION, THE CONSTITUENCIES (OTHER THAN UNIVERSITY CONSTITUENCIES) BY WHICH THE MEMBERS OF DÁIL ÉIREANN ARE ELECTED AND, IN CONSEQUENCE OF SUCH REVISION, TO ALTER THE NUMBER OF MEMBERS OF DÁIL ÉIREANN, AND FOR THOSE AND OTHER PURPOSES TO AMEND THE LAW RELATING TO THE ELECTION OF MEMBERS OF DÁIL ÉIREANN.
- Citation: No. 5 of 1935
- Territorial extent: Ireland
- Assented to: 27 February 1935
- Commenced: 14 June 1937
- Repealed: 12 January 1948

Legislative history
- Bill citation: No. 11 of 1934
- Introduced by: Minister for Local Government and Public Health (Seán T. O'Kelly)
- Introduced: 15 February 1934

Amends
- Electoral Act 1923

Repealed by
- Electoral (Amendment) Act 1947
- Status: Repealed

The Electoral (Revision of Constituencies) Act 1935 (No. 5) was a law in Ireland which replaced the Dáil constituencies which had been defined in the Electoral Act 1923.

Unlike the constituencies in the 1923 Act, it included many instances of crossing county boundaries to form constituencies. It reduced the number of seats in the Dáil by 15 from 153 to 138. This was in combination with the abolition of the two university constituencies, which was effected by the Constitution (Amendment No. 23) Act 1936 and the Electoral (University Constituencies) Act 1936, transferring all those on the register for university constituencies to the register for geographical constituencies.

It came into effect on the dissolution of the 8th Dáil and would be first used at the 1937 general election held on 21 July for the 9th Dáil. The constituencies would remain in operation at the 1938, 1943 and 1944 general elections.

The constituencies were revised again by the Electoral (Amendment) Act 1947, which created a scheme of constituencies which came into effect at the dissolution of the 12th Dáil and was first used at 1948 general election.

== Constituencies 1937–1948 ==
Explanation of columns

- Created: The year of the election when a constituency of the same name was last created.
- Seats: The number of TDs elected from the constituency under the Act.
- Change: Change in the number of seats since the last distribution of seats (which had been in force from 1923).

Constituency	Created	Seats	Change
Borough constituencies
Cork	1921	4	1
North-East Dublin	1937	3	New
North-West Dublin	1937	5	New
South Dublin	1921	7	none
Dublin Townships	1937	3	New
County constituencies
Athlone–Longford	1937	3	New
Carlow–Kildare	1937	4	New
Cavan	1921	4	none
Clare	1921	5	none
North Cork	1923	4	+ 1
South-East Cork	1937	3	New
West Cork	1923	5	none
East Donegal	1937	4	New
West Donegal	1937	3	New
Dublin	1921	5	− 3
East Galway	1937	4	New
West Galway	1937	3	New
North Kerry	1937	4	New
South Kerry	1937	3	New
Kilkenny	1937	3	New
Leitrim	1937	3	New
Leix–Offaly	1921	5	none
Limerick	1923	7	none
Louth	1923	3	none
North Mayo	1923	3	− 1
South Mayo	1923	5	none
Meath–Westmeath	1937	5	New
Monaghan	1921	3	none
Roscommon	1923	3	− 1
Sligo	1937	3	New
Tipperary	1923	7	none
Waterford	1923	4	none
Wexford	1921	5	none
Wicklow	1923	3	none

=== Abolished constituencies ===
Constituency	Created	Seats	Area moved to
Carlow–Kilkenny	1921	5	Carlow–Kildare and Kilkenny
Cork East	1923	5	North Cork and South-East Cork
Donegal	1921	8	East Donegal and West Donegal
Dublin North	1923	8	North-East Dublin and North-West Dublin
Galway	1921	9	East Galway and West Galway
Kerry	1923	7	North Kerry and South Kerry
Kildare	1923	3	Carlow–Kildare
Leitrim–Sligo	1923	7	Leitrim and Sligo
Longford–Westmeath	1921	5	Athlone–Longford and Meath–Westmeath
Meath	1923	3	Meath–Westmeath

== See also ==
- Elections in the Republic of Ireland
