= Cork South (Dáil constituency) =

Dáil constituency (1948–1961)

- Former Dáil constituency

Former constituency
- Created: 1948
- Abolished: 1961
- Seats: 3
- Local government area: County Cork

Cork South was a parliamentary constituency represented in Dáil Éireann, the lower house of the Irish parliament or Oireachtas from 1948 to 1961. The constituency elected 3 deputies (Teachtaí Dála, commonly known as TDs) to the Dáil, on the system of proportional representation by means of the single transferable vote (PR-STV).

== History ==
The constituency was created under the Electoral (Amendment) Act 1947, for the 1948 general election to Dáil Éireann. It succeeded the constituency of Cork South-East. It was abolished under the Electoral (Amendment) Act 1961, when it was partially replaced by the new constituency of Cork South-West.

== Boundaries ==
The administrative county of Cork except the portion thereof which was comprised in the constituencies of Cork Borough, Cork North, Cork East and Cork West.

== TDs ==
Teachtaí Dála (TDs) for Cork South 1948–1961
Key to parties: Lab = Labour; CnaT = Clann na Talmhan; FF = Fianna Fáil; Ind = Independent; FG = Fine Gael
Dáil	Election	Deputy (Party)	Deputy (Party)	Deputy (Party)
13th	1948	Dan Desmond (Lab)	Seán Buckley (FF)	Patrick Lehane (CnaT)
14th	1951	Dan Desmond (Lab)	Seán Buckley (FF)	Patrick Lehane (Ind)
15th	1954	Dan Desmond (Lab)	Seán McCarthy (FF)	Tadhg Manley (FG)
16th	1957	Dan Desmond (Lab)	Seán McCarthy (FF)	Tadhg Manley (FG)
17th	1961	Constituency abolished		

Note: The columns in this table are used only for presentational purposes, and no significance should be attached to the order of columns. For details of the order in which seats were won at each election, see the detailed results of that election.

== Elections ==
*: Outgoing TD

=== 1957 general election ===
1957 general election: Cork South
Party	Candidate	FPv%	Count	
Party	Candidate	FPv%	1	2
Labour	Dan Desmond	23.0	6,176	6,527
Fianna Fáil	Seán McCarthy	22.9	6,146	6,855
Fianna Fáil	Sean MacDiarmaid Fawsitt	18.7	5,016	5,982
Fine Gael	Tadhg Manley	17.8	4,769	6,999
Independent	Patrick Dineen	17.6	4,712	
Electorate: 36,421 Valid: 26,819 Quota: 6,705 Turnout: 73.6%

=== 1954 general election ===
1954 general election: Cork South
Party	Candidate	FPv%	Count		
Party	Candidate	FPv%	1	2	3
Labour	Dan Desmond	25.8	7,704		
Fine Gael	Tadhg Manley	24.8	7,401	9,930	
Fianna Fáil	Seán McCarthy	19.1	5,714	6,295	6,624
Fianna Fáil	Seán MacDiarmaid Fawsitt	16.3	4,872	5,475	5,798
Independent	Patrick Lehane	14.1	4,206		
Electorate: 36,935 Valid: 29,897 Quota: 7,475 Turnout: 80.9%

=== 1951 general election ===
1951 general election: Cork South
Party	Candidate	FPv%	Count		
Party	Candidate	FPv%	1	2	3
Labour	Dan Desmond	25.5	7,699		
Fianna Fáil	Seán Buckley	24.8	7,500	7,611	
Independent	Patrick Lehane	17.2	5,215	5,697	7,022
Fianna Fáil	William Kent	13.1	3,964	4,010	
Fine Gael	Tadhg Manley	10.2	3,089	5,124	5,416
Fine Gael	John L. O'Sullivan	9.2	2,775		
Electorate: 37,398 Valid: 30,242 Quota: 7,561 Turnout: 80.87%

=== 1948 general election ===
1948 general election: Cork South
Party	Candidate	FPv%	Count					
Party	Candidate	FPv%	1	2	3	4	5	6
Labour	Dan Desmond	25.1	7,241					
Clann na Talmhan	Patrick Lehane	18.2	5,245	5,247	5,395	6,087	6,227	6,858
Fianna Fáil	Seán Buckley	17.3	5,000	5,008	5,028	5,451	8,750	
Fine Gael	Eamonn O'Neill	15.6	4,488	4,494	5,326	5,949	5,995	6,147
Fianna Fáil	Jeremiah Browne	12.1	3,502	3,505	3,512	3,638		
Clann na Poblachta	Tom Hales	7.9	2,287	2,297	2,339			
Fine Gael	Michael O'Driscoll	3.7	1,077	1,078				
Electorate: 38,522 Valid: 28,840 Quota: 7,211 Turnout: 74.87%

== See also ==
- Dáil constituencies
- Politics of the Republic of Ireland
- Historic Dáil constituencies
- Elections in the Republic of Ireland
