= Martin Brennan (Irish politician) =

Irish politician (1900–1956)

Teachta Dála
- In office June 1938 – February 1948
- Constituency: Sligo

Personal details
- Born: 9 August 1900 Tubbercurry, County Sligo, Ireland
- Died: 21 June 1956 (aged 55) County Sligo, Ireland
- Party: Fianna Fáil
- Spouse: Sarah Foley (m. 1937)
- Children: 3
- Relatives: Matt Brennan (nephew)
- Education: University College Galway

Military service
- Branch/service: Irish Volunteers; Irish Republican Army; Anti-Treaty IRA

Martin Brennan (9 August 1900 – 21 June 1956) was an Irish Fianna Fáil politician, who was elected three times to Dáil Éireann.

He was born on 9 August 1900 in the family home at Rhue, Tubbercurry, County Sligo, the sixth of thirteen children of Matthew Brennan, a farmer, and his wife Bridget Gallagher. An exceptional student, he won scholarships to both St. Nathy's College, Ballaghaderreen, and University College Galway (UCG).

He joined the Irish Volunteers in 1916 and campaigned against the introduction of conscription in summer 1918, he became captain of the UCG company of the Irish Republican Army (IRA) in 1920. Later the same year he suspended his study of medicine and returned to Sligo, whereas a prominent member of the South Sligo Brigade active service unit of the IRA.

Taking the anti-Treaty side in the Irish Civil War, he was arrested in 1923 and sentenced to death, but after the intervention of the Bishop of Achonry, he was reprieved. After a forty-two day hunger-strike, he was released in July 1924.

Brennan was later awarded a pension by the Irish government under the Military Service Pensions Act, 1934 for his service with the IRA between 1919 and 1923.

Resumed his medical studies after the release, he graduated in 1927. Between 1927 and 1932, he held a series of short-term medical posts before being appointed district medical officer for the Aclare dispensary, County Sligo in 1932.

Brennan was elected as a Fianna Fáil Teachta Dála (TD) for the Sligo constituency at the 1938 general election. He was returned at the 1943 general election, and the following year he was re-elected at the 1944 general election. He did not contest the 1948 general election.

In January 1954 he succeeded Richard Hayes as the national film censor, and during his term of office (1954–1956) banned 9 per cent of all films submitted, as compared to 5 per cent in 1946–1953. He was the last film censor to respond to direct church intervention, when on 26 August 1954 the shot of the monstrance (bearing the blessed sacrament) was cut from Universal Newsreel.

A keen Irish language revivalist, he assisted Séamus Ó Duilearga in the collection of over 500 folklore records in the west of Ireland and Tomás Ó Máille in his research on Irish dialects and philology. His nephew Matt Brennan was a Fianna Fáil TD for Sligo–Leitrim from 1982 to 2002.

== See also ==
- Families in the Oireachtas

Dáil	Election	Deputy (Party)	Deputy (Party)	Deputy (Party)
9th	1937	Frank Carty (FF)	Martin Roddy (FG)	Patrick Rogers (FG)
10th	1938	Frank Carty (FF)	Martin Brennan (FF)	Patrick Rogers (FG)
11th	1943	Martin Roddy (FG)	Martin Brennan (FF)	Patrick Rogers (FG)
12th	1944	Martin Roddy (FG)	Martin Brennan (FF)	Patrick Rogers (FG)
13th	1948	Constituency abolished. See Sligo–Leitrim		
