= South Cork =

South Cork or Cork South may refer to one of two parliamentary constituencies in County Cork, Ireland:

- South Cork (UK Parliament constituency) (1885–1922)
- Cork South (Dáil constituency) (1948–1961)
