= Leitrim (Dáil constituency) =

Dáil constituency (1937–1948)

- Former Dáil constituency

Former constituency
- Created: 1937
- Abolished: 1948
- Seats: 3
- Local government areas: County Leitrim; County Sligo
- Created from: Leitrim–Sligo
- Replaced by: Sligo–Leitrim

Leitrim was a parliamentary constituency represented in Dáil Éireann, the lower house of the Oireachtas (the Irish parliament) from 1937 to 1948. The constituency elected 3 deputies (Teachtaí Dála, commonly known as TDs) to the Dáil, on the system of proportional representation by means of the single transferable vote (PR-STV).

== History ==
The constituency was created for the 1937 general election, when the Electoral (Revision of Constituencies) Act 1935 split the old Leitrim–Sligo constituency, with County Sligo being represented from 1937 through the new Sligo constituency.

Under the Electoral (Amendment) Act 1947, the Leitrim constituency was abolished, and the Sligo–Leitrim constituency was created for the 1948 general election.

== Boundaries ==
Some Dáil constituencies cross county boundaries, in order to ensure a reasonably consistent ratio of electors to TDs. The 1935 Act defines the boundaries of the Leitrim constituency as being:

"The administrative County of Leitrim and The District Electoral Divisions of: Ballintogher East, Ballynakill, Ballynashee, Cliffony North, Cliffony South, Drumcolumb, Killadoon, Kilmactranny, Rossinver East and Shancough in the administrative County of Sligo."

== TDs ==
Teachtaí Dála (TDs) for Leitrim 1937–1948
Key to parties: FF = Fianna Fáil; FG = Fine Gael; Ind = Independent
Dáil	Election	Deputy (Party)	Deputy (Party)	Deputy (Party)
9th	1937	Stephen Flynn (FF)	Bernard Maguire (FF)	Mary Reynolds (FG)
10th	1938	Stephen Flynn (FF)	Bernard Maguire (FF)	Mary Reynolds (FG)
11th	1943	Stephen Flynn (FF)	Bernard Maguire (Ind)	Mary Reynolds (FG)
12th	1944	Stephen Flynn (FF)	Bernard Maguire (Ind)	Mary Reynolds (FG)
13th	1948	Constituency abolished. See Sligo–Leitrim		

Note: The columns in this table are used only for presentational purposes, and no significance should be attached to the order of columns. For details of the order in which seats were won at each election, see the detailed results of that election.

== Elections ==
*: Outgoing TD

=== 1944 general election ===
1944 general election: Leitrim
Party	Candidate	FPv%	Count	
Party	Candidate	FPv%	1	2
Independent	Bernard Maguire	27.8	6,597	
Fianna Fáil	Stephen Flynn	26.8	6,347	
Fine Gael	Mary Reynolds	24.5	5,815	6,136
Clann na Talmhan	James Reynolds	20.8	4,935	5,287
Electorate: 35,677 Valid: 23,694 Quota: 5,924 Turnout: 66.4%

=== 1943 general election ===
1943 general election: Leitrim
Party	Candidate	FPv%	Count							
Party	Candidate	FPv%	1	2	3	4	5	6	7	8
Independent	Bernard Maguire	20.2	5,502	5,621	5,725	5,931	6,309	6,566	6,654	7,610
Fine Gael	Mary Reynolds	19.4	5,290	5,384	5,499	5,568	5,842	7,440		
Fianna Fáil	Stephen Flynn	15.3	4,175	4,226	4,567	5,199	6,156	6,321	6,370	6,979
Independent	Patrick Carey	9.7	2,642	2,724	2,807	2,889	3,110	3,171	3,203	
Fine Gael	Michael McGowan	8.8	2,409	2,459	2,550	2,613	2,629			
Independent	Joseph Mooney	6.9	1,896	2,057	2,329	2,536	2,671	3,051	3,498	4,068
Fianna Fáil	Thomas Burke	6.6	1,812	1,872	1,882	2,122				
Fianna Fáil	Edward Boles	5.7	1,558	1,684	1,709					
Independent	James McHugh	3.9	1,072	1,197						
Labour	James Gilhooly	3.4	939							
Electorate: 35,677 Valid: 27,295 Quota: 6,824 Turnout: 76.5%

=== 1938 general election ===
1938 general election: Leitrim
Party	Candidate	FPv%	Count		
Party	Candidate	FPv%	1	2	3
Fianna Fáil	Bernard Maguire	31.3	8,481		
Fianna Fáil	Stephen Flynn	29.4	7,958		
Fine Gael	Mary Reynolds	21.3	5,778	6,090	6,188
Fine Gael	Andrew Mooney	18.0	4,862	4,987	5,099
Electorate: 35,568 Valid: 27,079 Quota: 6,770 Turnout: 76.1%

=== 1937 general election ===
1937 general election: Leitrim
Party	Candidate	FPv%	Count				
Party	Candidate	FPv%	1	2	3	4	5
Fianna Fáil	Bernard Maguire	28.5	7,755				
Fianna Fáil	Stephen Flynn	22.5	6,129	6,942			
Fine Gael	Mary Reynolds	19.5	5,296	5,357	5,909	5,976	6,653
Independent	James Dolan	9.2	2,508	2,522	2,568	2,598	2,947
Fine Gael	John Travers	7.6	2,070	2,079	2,169	2,193	2,993
Fine Gael	John Hennigan	7.6	2,057	2,065	2,090	2,104	
Independent	Patrick Tubman	5.2	1,411	1,454			
Electorate: 36,368 Valid: 27,226 Quota: 6,807 Turnout: 74.9%

== See also ==
- Dáil constituencies
- Politics of the Republic of Ireland
- Historic Dáil constituencies
- Elections in the Republic of Ireland
