= Philip Mahony =

Philip Mahony may refer to:

- Philip Mahony (politician) (1897–1972), Irish Clann na Talmhan politician
- Philip Mahony (hurler) (born 1991), Irish hurler
