= Patrick Rogers =

Irish politician (1900–1963)

Teachta Dála
- In office March 1957 – October 1961
- In office May 1951 – May 1954
- Constituency: Sligo–Leitrim
- In office July 1937 – February 1948
- Constituency: Sligo
- In office January 1933 – July 1937
- Constituency: Leitrim–Sligo

Personal details
- Born: 1 February 1900 County Sligo, Ireland
- Died: 22 March 1963 (aged 63) County Sligo, Ireland
- Party: Fine Gael; National Centre Party

Patrick James Rogers (1 February 1900 – 22 March 1963) was an Irish politician and farmer.

He was first elected to Dáil Éireann at the 1933 general election as a National Centre Party Teachta Dála (TD) for the Leitrim–Sligo constituency. He was elected as a Fine Gael TD for the Sligo constituency at the 1937 general election. He was re-elected at the 1938, 1943 and 1944 general elections.

He lost his seat at the 1948 general election but was elected for the Sligo–Leitrim constituency at the 1951 general election. He lost his seat again at the 1954 general election but was re-elected at the 1957 general election. He did not contest the 1961 general election. He served on Sligo County Council for the Ballymote area from 1928 until his death in 1963.

| Dáil | Election | Deputy (Party) | Deputy (Party) | Deputy (Party) | Deputy (Party) | Deputy (Party) | Deputy (Party) | Deputy (Party) |
|---|---|---|---|---|---|---|---|---|
| 4th | 1923 | Martin McGowan (Rep) | Frank Carty (Rep) | Thomas Carter (CnaG) | Seán Farrell (Rep) | James Dolan (CnaG) | John Hennigan (CnaG) | Alexander McCabe (CnaG) |
| 4th | 1925 by-election | Martin McGowan (Rep) | Frank Carty (Rep) | Samuel Holt (Rep) | Seán Farrell (Rep) | James Dolan (CnaG) | John Hennigan (CnaG) | Martin Roddy (CnaG) |
| 5th | 1927 (Jun) | John Jinks (NL) | Frank Carty (FF) | Samuel Holt (FF) | Michael Carter (FP) | James Dolan (CnaG) | John Hennigan (CnaG) | Martin Roddy (CnaG) |
| 6th | 1927 (Sep) | Bernard Maguire (FF) | Frank Carty (FF) | Samuel Holt (FF) | Patrick Reynolds (CnaG) | James Dolan (CnaG) | John Hennigan (CnaG) | Martin Roddy (CnaG) |
| 6th | 1929 by-election | Bernard Maguire (FF) | Frank Carty (FF) | Seán Mac Eoin (CnaG) | Patrick Reynolds (CnaG) | James Dolan (CnaG) | John Hennigan (CnaG) | Martin Roddy (CnaG) |
| 7th | 1932 | Bernard Maguire (FF) | Frank Carty (FF) | Stephen Flynn (FF) | Mary Reynolds (CnaG) | William Browne (FF) | John Hennigan (CnaG) | Martin Roddy (CnaG) |
| 8th | 1933 | Bernard Maguire (FF) | Frank Carty (FF) | Stephen Flynn (FF) | Patrick Rogers (NCP) | William Browne (FF) | James Dolan (CnaG) | Martin Roddy (CnaG) |
| 9th | 1937 | Constituency abolished. See Sligo and Leitrim | | | | | | |

| Dáil | Election | Deputy (Party) | Deputy (Party) | Deputy (Party) |
|---|---|---|---|---|
| 9th | 1937 | Frank Carty (FF) | Martin Roddy (FG) | Patrick Rogers (FG) |
| 10th | 1938 | Frank Carty (FF) | Martin Brennan (FF) | Patrick Rogers (FG) |
| 11th | 1943 | Martin Roddy (FG) | Martin Brennan (FF) | Patrick Rogers (FG) |
| 12th | 1944 | Martin Roddy (FG) | Martin Brennan (FF) | Patrick Rogers (FG) |
| 13th | 1948 | Constituency abolished. See Sligo–Leitrim | | |

| Dáil | Election | Deputy (Party) | Deputy (Party) | Deputy (Party) | Deputy (Party) | Deputy (Party) |
|---|---|---|---|---|---|---|
| 13th | 1948 | Eugene Gilbride (FF) | Stephen Flynn (FF) | Bernard Maguire (Ind.) | Mary Reynolds (FG) | Joseph Roddy (FG) |
| 14th | 1951 | Eugene Gilbride (FF) | Stephen Flynn (FF) | Patrick Rogers (FG) | Mary Reynolds (FG) | Joseph Roddy (FG) |
| 15th | 1954 | Eugene Gilbride (FF) | Stephen Flynn (FF) | Bernard Maguire (Ind.) | Mary Reynolds (FG) | Joseph Roddy (FG) |
| 16th | 1957 | Eugene Gilbride (FF) | Stephen Flynn (FF) | John Joe McGirl (SF) | Mary Reynolds (FG) | Patrick Rogers (FG) |
| 16th | 1961 by-election | Eugene Gilbride (FF) | Joseph McLoughlin (FG) | John Joe McGirl (SF) | Mary Reynolds (FG) | Patrick Rogers (FG) |
| 17th | 1961 | Eugene Gilbride (FF) | Joseph McLoughlin (FG) | James Gallagher (FF) | Eugene Gilhawley (FG) | 4 seats 1961–1969 |
| 18th | 1965 | Eugene Gilbride (FF) | Joseph McLoughlin (FG) | James Gallagher (FF) | Eugene Gilhawley (FG) | 4 seats 1961–1969 |
| 19th | 1969 | Ray MacSharry (FF) | Joseph McLoughlin (FG) | James Gallagher (FF) | 3 seats 1969–1981 | |
| 20th | 1973 | Ray MacSharry (FF) | Joseph McLoughlin (FG) | Eugene Gilhawley (FG) | 3 seats 1969–1981 | |
| 21st | 1977 | Ray MacSharry (FF) | James Gallagher (FF) | Eugene Gilhawley (FG) | 3 seats 1969–1981 | |
| 22nd | 1981 | Ray MacSharry (FF) | John Ellis (FF) | Joe McCartin (FG) | Ted Nealon (FG) | 4 seats 1981–2007 |
| 23rd | 1982 (Feb) | Ray MacSharry (FF) | John Ellis (FF) | Matt Brennan (FF) | Ted Nealon (FG) | 4 seats 1981–2007 |
| 24th | 1982 (Nov) | Ray MacSharry (FF) | Joe McCartin (FG) | Matt Brennan (FF) | Ted Nealon (FG) | 4 seats 1981–2007 |
| 25th | 1987 | Ray MacSharry (FF) | John Ellis (FF) | Matt Brennan (FF) | Ted Nealon (FG) | 4 seats 1981–2007 |
| 26th | 1989 | Gerry Reynolds (FG) | John Ellis (FF) | Matt Brennan (FF) | Ted Nealon (FG) | 4 seats 1981–2007 |
| 27th | 1992 | Declan Bree (Lab) | John Ellis (FF) | Matt Brennan (FF) | Ted Nealon (FG) | 4 seats 1981–2007 |
| 28th | 1997 | Gerry Reynolds (FG) | John Ellis (FF) | Matt Brennan (FF) | John Perry (FG) | 4 seats 1981–2007 |
| 29th | 2002 | Marian Harkin (Ind.) | John Ellis (FF) | Jimmy Devins (FF) | John Perry (FG) | 4 seats 1981–2007 |
| 30th | 2007 | Constituency abolished. See Sligo–North Leitrim and Roscommon–South Leitrim | | | | |

| Dáil | Election | Deputy (Party) | Deputy (Party) | Deputy (Party) | Deputy (Party) |
|---|---|---|---|---|---|
| 32nd | 2016 | Martin Kenny (SF) | Marc MacSharry (FF) | Eamon Scanlon (FF) | Tony McLoughlin (FG) |
| 33rd | 2020 | Martin Kenny (SF) | Marc MacSharry (FF) | Marian Harkin (Ind.) | Frank Feighan (FG) |
| 34th | 2024 | Martin Kenny (SF) | Eamon Scanlon (FF) | Marian Harkin (Ind.) | Frank Feighan (FG) |
