= Electoral (Amendment) Act 1961 =

Constituencies in use at Dáil elections from 1961 to 1969

Oireachtas
- Long title: AN ACT TO FIX THE NUMBER OF MEMBERS OF DÁIL ÉIREANN AND TO REVISE THEIR CONSTITUENCIES AND TO AMEND THE LAW RELATING TO THE ELECTION OF SUCH MEMBERS.
- Citation: No. 19 of 1961
- Signed: 14 July 1961
- Commenced: 14 July 1961 & 15 September 1961
- Repealed: 22 May 1969

Legislative history
- Bill citation: No. 6 of 1961
- Introduced by: Minister for Local Government (Neil Blaney)
- Introduced: 7 March 1961

Repeals
- Electoral (Amendment) Act 1947; Electoral (Amendment) Act 1959

Repealed by
- Electoral (Amendment) Act 1969
- Status: Repealed

The Electoral (Amendment) Act 1961 (No. 19) was a law in Ireland which revised Dáil constituencies. The new constituencies were first used at the 1961 general election to the 17th Dáil held on 4 October 1961.

This Act replaced the Electoral (Amendment) Act 1947, which had defined constituencies since the 1948 general election.

The Electoral (Amendment) Act 1959 had been struck out in 1961 by the High Court as being repugnant to the Constitution of Ireland because of excessive malapportionment and never came into effect. The Electoral (Amendment) Act 1961 relied instead on manipulating district size. Where Fianna Fáil had less than 50% support, four-seat constituencies were used, so that Fianna Fáil would win two of four seats; where it had more than 50% support, three- or five-seat constituencies would give it two of three, or three of five. It also reduced the number of seats in the Dáil by 3 from 147 to 144.

Before signing the bill, president Éamon de Valera convened a meeting of the Council of State on 14 July to consider the legislation. He then referred it to the Supreme Court to consider its constitutionality under Article 26 of the Constitution of Ireland. It held that the legislation was not repugnant to the constitution, and the president signed the legislation.

It was repealed by the Electoral (Amendment) Act 1969, which created a new schedule of constituencies first used at the 1969 general election to the 19th Dáil.

== Constituencies ==
Constituency	Seats
Borough constituencies
Cork	5
Dublin North-Central	4
Dublin North-East	5
Dublin North-West	3
Dublin South-Central	5
Dublin South-East	3
Dublin South-West	5
County constituencies
Carlow–Kilkenny	5
Cavan	3
Clare	4
Cork Mid	4
Cork North-East	5
Cork South-West	3
Donegal North-East	3
Donegal South-West	3
Dublin	5
Dún Laoghaire and Rathdown	4
Galway East	5
Galway West	3
Kerry North	3
Kerry South	3
Kildare	4
Laoighis–Offaly	5
Limerick East	4
Limerick West	3
Longford–Westmeath	4
Louth	3
Mayo North	3
Mayo South	4
Meath	3
Monaghan	3
Roscommon	4
Sligo–Leitrim	4
Tipperary North	3
Tipperary South	4
Waterford	3
Wexford	4
Wicklow	3

== See also ==
- Elections in the Republic of Ireland
