= Electoral (Amendment) Act 1959 =

Law to revise Dáil constituencies found to be repugnant to the Constitution

Oireachtas
- Long title: AN ACT TO FIX THE NUMBER OF MEMBERS OF DÁIL ÉIREANN AND TO REVISE THEIR CONSTITUENCIES AND TO AMEND THE LAW RELATING TO THE ELECTION OF SUCH MEMBERS.
- Citation: No. 33 of 1959
- Signed: 26 November 1959
- Commenced: 26 November 1959 (in part)
- Repealed: 14 July 1961

Legislative history
- Bill citation: No. 34 of 1959
- Introduced by: Minister for Local Government (Neil Blaney)
- Introduced: 22 July 1959

Repealed by
- Electoral (Amendment) Act 1961
- Status: Struck down

The Electoral (Amendment) Act 1959 (No. 33) was a law in Ireland which sought to revise Dáil constituencies. It was found to be repugnant to the Constitution and never came into effect.

It was challenged by John O'Donovan, a Fine Gael senator and former TD. In O'Donovan v. Attorney-General (1961), the High Court held that the Act was unconstitutional and suggested that the ratio of representation to population across constituencies should differ by no more than 5%. The court, interpreting the "so far as it is practicable" condition of the Constitution, suggested a 5% variation as the limit without exceptional circumstances.

It was formally repealed by the Electoral (Amendment) Act 1961.

== See also ==
- Elections in the Republic of Ireland
