= Tadhg Manley =

Irish politician (1893–1976)

Teachta Dála
- In office May 1954 – October 1961
- Constituency: Cork South

Personal details
- Born: 20 April 1893 County Cork, Ireland
- Died: 24 August 1976 (aged 83) County Cork, Ireland
- Party: Fine Gael
- Relatives: Liam Burke (nephew)

Tadhg Manley (20 April 1893 – 24 August 1976) was an Irish Fine Gael politician. A teacher by profession, he was an unsuccessful candidate at the 1951 general election. He was elected to Dáil Éireann as a Fine Gael Teachta Dála (TD) for the Cork South constituency at the 1954 general election.

He was re-elected at the 1957 general election. He did not contest the 1961 general election. He was an unsuccessful candidate at the 1964 Cork Borough by-election.

His nephew Liam Burke was a Fine Gael TD and senator from 1969 to 2002.

Dáil	Election	Deputy (Party)	Deputy (Party)	Deputy (Party)
13th	1948	Dan Desmond (Lab)	Seán Buckley (FF)	Patrick Lehane (CnaT)
14th	1951	Dan Desmond (Lab)	Seán Buckley (FF)	Patrick Lehane (Ind.)
15th	1954	Dan Desmond (Lab)	Seán McCarthy (FF)	Tadhg Manley (FG)
16th	1957	Dan Desmond (Lab)	Seán McCarthy (FF)	Tadhg Manley (FG)
17th	1961	Constituency abolished		
