= Eamonn Coogan =

Irish politician and police officer (1896–1948)

Teachta Dála
- In office May 1944 – 22 January 1948
- Constituency: Kilkenny

Personal details
- Born: 30 November 1896 Castlecomer, County Kilkenny, Ireland
- Died: 22 January 1948 (aged 51) Dublin, Ireland
- Party: Fine Gael
- Spouse: Beatrice Toal (m. 1928)
- Children: 3, including Tim Pat (son)
- Education: University College Dublin

Military service
- Branch/service: Irish Volunteers; National Volunteers; Irish Republican Army
- Battles/wars: Irish War of Independence

Eamonn Coogan (30 November 1896 – 22 January 1948) was an Irish Fine Gael politician, barrister and Deputy Commissioner of the Garda Síochána.

== Early life ==
He was born in Castlecomer, County Kilkenny, the only son of Timothy Coogan, a shopkeeper, and Bridget Coogan (née Joyce). He was educated at Castlecomer national school; St Kieran's College, Kilkenny; St Mary's College, County Carlow; and University College Dublin, where he graduated with a Bachelor of Commerce.

He was an active member of the Irish Volunteers and later the National Volunteers, he declined the offer of a scholarship to the London School of Economics in 1918 due to his political commitments. He was Vice-principal of the Technical Institute, Athlone from 1918 to 1919, and was principal of the Limerick School of Commerce and vice-principal of the Technical Institute, Limerick from 1919 to 1920.

He was friends with David Neligan. Eoin O'Duffy was best man at his wedding.

== War of Independence ==
During the Irish War of Independence, Coogan and another man were ordered by Michael Collins to kill two young women who had been passing on information to the police. Coogan did not shoot them because he thought they were "very young and very beautiful". On the British government's suppression of the Technical Institute in May 1920, he spent some time organising Volunteers in Kilkenny before joining colleagues from the Limerick Technical Institute in the Dáil department of local government in September 1920. During this time he also served on the intelligence staff of the Volunteers.

== Garda career ==
Following the Anglo-Irish Treaty he served for a short time under the provisional government with the Department of Finance before being appointed assistant commissioner of the Civic Guards on 1 September 1922, and later deputy commissioner on 1 January 1923. At the Garda headquarters Coogan was one of the few senior-ranking officers who had not served with the Royal Irish Constabulary. Set the task of supervising the distribution of the force around the country, he also had charge of the Garda educational syllabus.

After the sacking of Chief Superintendent Dave Neligan in December 1932, Coogan took over responsibility for the special branch but in February 1933 he relinquished the post on the appointment Eamon Broy. In March 1933 Coogan was passed over for promotion to the rank of commissioner in favour of Broy, and in 1934 he was transferred to the administrative branch. In autumn 1934 he took up the study of law and won the Swift MacNeill memorial prize and graduated BA (legal studies) and LLB from the National University of Ireland in 1937. He was fluent in Irish, and among his responsibilities were the encouragement of the Irish language in the force, and the conduct of all matters relating to the Irish-speaking divisions of the gardaí in Donegal, Galway, and Kerry.

He had been fired as Deputy Garda Commissioner in 1936 after an altercation with the general manager of The Irish Press but he remained in the force and held the rank of chief superintendent until he was forced to retire in 1941, following an incident in the foyer of the Gresham Hotel when an American tourist was assaulted.

== Political and legal career ==
Following his sacking he worked as a barrister and as the general secretary of Fine Gael. He was called to the bar in 1941, and built up an extensive practice during the short period before his entry into politics. He was elected a member of Dún Laoghaire borough council in August 1942.

He was elected to Dáil Éireann as a Teachta Dála (TD) for the Kilkenny constituency at the 1944 general election. He died during the 1948 general election campaign, and polling was postponed in his constituency of Carlow–Kilkenny.

== Death and personal life ==
He married Beatrice Toal in 1928. The family resided in Monkstown, Dublin. They had three children, including the historian Tim Pat Coogan. Eamonn Coogan died on 22 January 1948 at the Meath Hospital, Dublin.

Dáil	Election	Deputy (Party)	Deputy (Party)	Deputy (Party)
9th	1937	James Pattison (Lab)	Thomas Derrig (FF)	Denis Gorey (FG)
10th	1938	James Pattison (Lab)	Thomas Derrig (FF)	Denis Gorey (FG)
11th	1943	James Pattison (Lab)	Thomas Derrig (FF)	Philip Mahony (CnaT)
12th	1944	James Pattison (NLP)	Thomas Derrig (FF)	Eamonn Coogan (FG)
13th	1948	Constituency abolished. See Carlow–Kilkenny		
