= Kilkenny (Dáil constituency) =

Dáil constituency (1937–1948)

- Former Dáil constituency

Former constituency
- Created: 1937
- Abolished: 1948
- Seats: 3
- Local government area: County Kilkenny
- Created from: Carlow–Kilkenny
- Replaced by: Carlow–Kilkenny

Kilkenny was a parliamentary constituency represented in Dáil Éireann, the lower house of the Irish parliament or Oireachtas from 1937 to 1948. The constituency elected 3 deputies (Teachtaí Dála, commonly known as TDs) to the Dáil, on the system of proportional representation by means of the single transferable vote (PR-STV).

== History ==
The constituency was created for the 1937 general election, when the Electoral (Revision of Constituencies) Act 1935 split the old Carlow–Kilkenny constituency, with County Carlow being represented from 1937 through the new Carlow–Kildare constituency.

Under the Electoral (Amendment) Act 1947, the Kilkenny constituency was abolished, and Carlow–Kilkenny was restored for the 1948 general election.

== Boundaries ==
The 1937 Act defined the boundaries of the Kilkenny constituency as "the administrative County of Kilkenny".

== TDs ==
Teachtaí Dála (TDs) for Kilkenny 1937–1948
Key to parties: CnaT = Clann na Talmhan; FF = Fianna Fáil; FG = Fine Gael; Lab = Labour; NLP = National Labour Party
Dáil	Election	Deputy (Party)	Deputy (Party)	Deputy (Party)
9th	1937	James Pattison (Lab)	Thomas Derrig (FF)	Denis Gorey (FG)
10th	1938	James Pattison (Lab)	Thomas Derrig (FF)	Denis Gorey (FG)
11th	1943	James Pattison (Lab)	Thomas Derrig (FF)	Philip Mahony (CnaT)
12th	1944	James Pattison (NLP)	Thomas Derrig (FF)	Eamonn Coogan (FG)
13th	1948	Constituency abolished. See Carlow–Kilkenny		

Note: The columns in this table are used only for presentational purposes, and no significance should be attached to the order of columns. For details of the order in which seats were won at each election, see the detailed results of that election.

== Elections ==
*: Outgoing TD

=== 1944 general election ===
1944 general election: Kilkenny
Party	Candidate	FPv%	Count			
Party	Candidate	FPv%	1	2	3	4
Fianna Fáil	Thomas Derrig	26.7	7,679			
National Labour Party	James Pattison	21.7	6,239	6,749	6,811	7,283
Fine Gael	Eamonn Coogan	21.1	6,071	7,861		
Fianna Fáil	Thomas Walsh	19.7	5,667	6,373	6,786	6,971
Clann na Talmhan	Philip Mahony	11.0	3,157			
Electorate: 41,160 Valid: 28,813 Quota: 7,204 Turnout: 70.0%

=== 1943 general election ===
1943 general election: Kilkenny
Party	Candidate	FPv%	Count				
Party	Candidate	FPv%	1	2	3	4	5
Fianna Fáil	Thomas Derrig	21.9	6,852	6,870	7,009	7,194	7,213
Labour	James Pattison	20.6	6,417	6,495	7,732	8,087	
Clann na Talmhan	Philip Mahony	17.4	5,420	5,640	5,691	5,864	8,429
Fianna Fáil	Thomas Walsh	15.7	4,910	5,002	5,072	5,143	5,459
Fine Gael	Richard Gorey	8.0	2,511	2,927	2,968	4,826	
Fine Gael	Thomas De Loughrey	7.5	2,337	2,552	2,685		
Labour	Nicholas Boran	5.4	1,699	1,717			
Fine Gael	William Mullins	3.4	1,071				
Electorate: 41,160 Valid: 31,217 Quota: 7,805 Turnout: 75.8%

=== 1938 general election ===
1938 general election: Kilkenny
Party	Candidate	FPv%	Count			
Party	Candidate	FPv%	1	2	3	4
Fianna Fáil	Thomas Derrig	34.0	11,327			
Fine Gael	Denis Gorey	27.4	9,125			
Labour	James Pattison	20.2	6,720	6,975	7,712	8,306
Fianna Fáil	Joseph Rice	13.3	4,419	7,143	7,488	7,694
Fine Gael	Simon Walton	5.1	1,708	1,731		
Electorate: 40,537 Valid: 33,299 Quota: 8,325 Turnout: 82.1%

=== 1937 general election ===
1937 general election: Kilkenny
Party	Candidate	FPv%	Count			
Party	Candidate	FPv%	1	2	3	4
Labour	James Pattison	23.3	7,616	7,679	7,950	8,969
Fianna Fáil	Thomas Derrig	22.9	7,494	7,519	7,576	7,607
Fianna Fáil	Seán Gibbons	18.5	6,054	6,138	6,382	6,508
Fine Gael	Denis Gorey	15.7	5,132	6,080	10,683	
Fine Gael	Desmond FitzGerald	14.7	4,820	5,289		
Fine Gael	Richard Holohan	5.0	1,628			
Electorate: 40,900 Valid: 32,744 Quota: 8,187 Turnout: 80.1%

== See also ==
- Dáil constituencies
- Politics of the Republic of Ireland
- Historic Dáil constituencies
- Elections in the Republic of Ireland
