= Denis Gorey =

Irish politician (1874–1940)

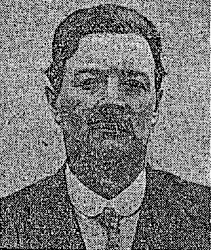
- Gorey c. 1931

Teachta Dála
- In office July 1937 – 20 February 1940
- Constituency: Kilkenny
- In office November 1927 – January 1933
- In office June 1922 – September 1927
- Constituency: Carlow–Kilkenny

Leader of the Farmers' Party
- In office 1922–1927
- Succeeded by: Patrick Baxter

Personal details
- Born: 25 May 1874
- Died: 20 February 1940 (aged 65)
- Party: Farmers' Party; Cumann na nGaedheal; Fine Gael

Denis John Gorey (25 May 1874 – 20 February 1940) was an Irish politician who served for nearly twenty years as Teachta Dála (TD), first as leader of the Farmers' Party, then for Cumann na nGaedheal, and finally for Fine Gael.

Gorey was first elected to the 3rd Dáil at the 1922 general election for Carlow–Kilkenny, taking his seat as leader of the Farmers' Party, which won seven seats.

He was re-elected at the 1923 general election, leading the Farmers' Party to a new high of 15 seats in the 4th Dáil. However, with the anti-Treaty TDs abstaining from Dáil Éireann, the party remained in opposition to the Cumann na nGaedheal government of W. T. Cosgrave.

Gorey left the Farmers' Party and fought the June 1927 general election as a Cumann na nGaedheal candidate, winning election to the 5th Dáil. He lost his seat at the September 1927 general election. However, he was re-elected at the by-election on 3 November 1927 after W. T. Cosgrave, who had been elected both for Carlow–Kilkenny and Cork Borough, chose to represent Cork Borough.

At the 1932 general election, he was re-elected with a share of the first-preference vote below 6%, relying on transfers for other candidates to reach the quota as the last of five TDs to be elected. He lost his seat again at the 1933 general election, but was returned at the 1937 general election to the 9th Dáil, for the new Kilkenny constituency, where he was returned again at the 1938 general election.

After his death on 20 February 1940 at the age of 65, no by-election was held for his seat, which remained vacant until the 1943 general election.

== Antisemitic quotes ==
It is time for us to become Jewmen, because the day is approaching when the Jewmen will replace this race if we do not buckle to...I shall make the same remark addressing you. It looks as if the Jewmen are going to replace this race if this race is to go down in idleness."

— Denis Gorey, Dáil Éireann debate, 2 May 1923

It does not matter whether he is a Jewman or not. If we want to live in this country, and if we are not to be replaced absolutely by Jews, if we do not want to be driven out to starve and leave the country and allow it to become a Jewish colony, we ought to get down to work.

— Denis Gorey, Dáil Éireann debate, 6 May 1924

I have heard the Minister's explanation about old clothing, that it was going to be put up for auction. I suggest that this old clothing should be disposed of in the different towns where it happens to be found. It would save expense, and would give an opportunity to the local people, who have as much claim as Dublin has to it, to procure this material that might be very useful to the inhabitants. I believe it used to be the custom to sell it in one heap, and that the Jews are the people who get hold of it. It is said that one big Jew, who has been identified with army matters for some years, gets it. His name has been mentioned freely as the man who derives all the benefit with regard to this class of thing and some other classes of things. We have someone else to cater for in this country besides Jews. I suggest this clothing should be sold at the different Army depôts down the country, where it accumulates, and that it should not be brought up here and sold in one big heap to a big Jew.

— Denis Gorey, Dáil Éireann debate, 20 May 1925

Dáil	Election	Deputy (Party)	Deputy (Party)	Deputy (Party)	Deputy (Party)	Deputy (Party)
2nd	1921	Edward Aylward (SF)	W. T. Cosgrave (SF)	James Lennon (SF)	Gearóid O'Sullivan (SF)	4 seats 1921–1923
3rd	1922	Patrick Gaffney (Lab)	W. T. Cosgrave (PT-SF)	Denis Gorey (FP)	Gearóid O'Sullivan (PT-SF)	4 seats 1921–1923
4th	1923	Edward Doyle (Lab)	W. T. Cosgrave (CnaG)	Denis Gorey (FP)	Michael Shelly (Rep)	Seán Gibbons (CnaG)
4th	1925 by-election	Edward Doyle (Lab)	W. T. Cosgrave (CnaG)	Denis Gorey (FP)	Michael Shelly (Rep)	Thomas Bolger (CnaG)
5th	1927 (Jun)	Edward Doyle (Lab)	W. T. Cosgrave (CnaG)	Denis Gorey (CnaG)	Thomas Derrig (FF)	Richard Holohan (FP)
6th	1927 (Sep)	Edward Doyle (Lab)	W. T. Cosgrave (CnaG)	Peter de Loughry (CnaG)	Thomas Derrig (FF)	Richard Holohan (FP)
6th	1927 by-election	Edward Doyle (Lab)	Denis Gorey (CnaG)	Peter de Loughry (CnaG)	Thomas Derrig (FF)	Richard Holohan (FP)
7th	1932	Francis Humphreys (FF)	Denis Gorey (CnaG)	Desmond FitzGerald (CnaG)	Thomas Derrig (FF)	Seán Gibbons (FF)
8th	1933	James Pattison (Lab)	Richard Holohan (NCP)	Desmond FitzGerald (CnaG)	Thomas Derrig (FF)	Seán Gibbons (FF)
9th	1937	Constituency abolished. See Kilkenny and Carlow–Kildare				

Dáil	Election	Deputy (Party)	Deputy (Party)	Deputy (Party)	Deputy (Party)	Deputy (Party)
13th	1948	James Pattison (NLP)	Thomas Walsh (FF)	Thomas Derrig (FF)	Joseph Hughes (FG)	Patrick Crotty (FG)
14th	1951	Francis Humphreys (FF)	Thomas Walsh (FF)	Thomas Derrig (FF)	Joseph Hughes (FG)	Patrick Crotty (FG)
15th	1954	James Pattison (Lab)	Thomas Walsh (FF)	Thomas Derrig (FF)	Joseph Hughes (FG)	Patrick Crotty (FG)
15th	1956 by-election	James Pattison (Lab)	Martin Medlar (FF)	Thomas Derrig (FF)	Joseph Hughes (FG)	Patrick Crotty (FG)
16th	1957	Francis Humphreys (FF)	Martin Medlar (FF)	Jim Gibbons (FF)	Joseph Hughes (FG)	Patrick Crotty (FG)
16th	1960 by-election	Patrick Teehan (FF)	Martin Medlar (FF)	Jim Gibbons (FF)	Joseph Hughes (FG)	Patrick Crotty (FG)
17th	1961	Séamus Pattison (Lab)	Martin Medlar (FF)	Jim Gibbons (FF)	Desmond Governey (FG)	Patrick Crotty (FG)
18th	1965	Séamus Pattison (Lab)	Tom Nolan (FF)	Jim Gibbons (FF)	Desmond Governey (FG)	Patrick Crotty (FG)
19th	1969	Séamus Pattison (Lab)	Tom Nolan (FF)	Jim Gibbons (FF)	Desmond Governey (FG)	Kieran Crotty (FG)
20th	1973	Séamus Pattison (Lab)	Tom Nolan (FF)	Jim Gibbons (FF)	Desmond Governey (FG)	Kieran Crotty (FG)
21st	1977	Séamus Pattison (Lab)	Tom Nolan (FF)	Jim Gibbons (FF)	Liam Aylward (FF)	Kieran Crotty (FG)
22nd	1981	Séamus Pattison (Lab)	Tom Nolan (FF)	Desmond Governey (FG)	Liam Aylward (FF)	Kieran Crotty (FG)
23rd	1982 (Feb)	Séamus Pattison (Lab)	Jim Gibbons (FF)	Desmond Governey (FG)	Liam Aylward (FF)	Kieran Crotty (FG)
24th	1982 (Nov)	Séamus Pattison (Lab)	M. J. Nolan (FF)	Dick Dowling (FG)	Liam Aylward (FF)	Kieran Crotty (FG)
25th	1987	Séamus Pattison (Lab)	M. J. Nolan (FF)	Martin Gibbons (PDs)	Liam Aylward (FF)	Kieran Crotty (FG)
26th	1989	Séamus Pattison (Lab)	M. J. Nolan (FF)	Phil Hogan (FG)	Liam Aylward (FF)	John Browne (FG)
27th	1992	Séamus Pattison (Lab)	M. J. Nolan (FF)	Phil Hogan (FG)	Liam Aylward (FF)	John Browne (FG)
28th	1997	Séamus Pattison (Lab)	John McGuinness (FF)	Phil Hogan (FG)	Liam Aylward (FF)	John Browne (FG)
29th	2002	Séamus Pattison (Lab)	John McGuinness (FF)	Phil Hogan (FG)	Liam Aylward (FF)	M. J. Nolan (FF)
30th	2007	Mary White (GP)	John McGuinness (FF)	Phil Hogan (FG)	Bobby Aylward (FF)	M. J. Nolan (FF)
31st	2011	Ann Phelan (Lab)	John McGuinness (FF)	Phil Hogan (FG)	John Paul Phelan (FG)	Pat Deering (FG)
31st	2015 by-election	Ann Phelan (Lab)	John McGuinness (FF)	Bobby Aylward (FF)	John Paul Phelan (FG)	Pat Deering (FG)
32nd	2016	Kathleen Funchion (SF)	John McGuinness (FF)	Bobby Aylward (FF)	John Paul Phelan (FG)	Pat Deering (FG)
33rd	2020	Kathleen Funchion (SF)	John McGuinness (FF)	Jennifer Murnane O'Connor (FF)	John Paul Phelan (FG)	Malcolm Noonan (GP)
34th	2024	Natasha Newsome Drennan (SF)	John McGuinness (FF)	Jennifer Murnane O'Connor (FF)	Catherine Callaghan (FG)	Peter "Chap" Cleere (FF)

Dáil	Election	Deputy (Party)	Deputy (Party)	Deputy (Party)
9th	1937	James Pattison (Lab)	Thomas Derrig (FF)	Denis Gorey (FG)
10th	1938	James Pattison (Lab)	Thomas Derrig (FF)	Denis Gorey (FG)
11th	1943	James Pattison (Lab)	Thomas Derrig (FF)	Philip Mahony (CnaT)
12th	1944	James Pattison (NLP)	Thomas Derrig (FF)	Eamonn Coogan (FG)
13th	1948	Constituency abolished. See Carlow–Kilkenny		
