= Patrick Lehane =

Irish politician (died 1976)

Teachta Dála
- In office February 1948 – May 1954
- Constituency: Cork South

Personal details
- Born: County Cork, Ireland
- Died: 1 July 1976
- Party: Clann na Talmhan
- Other political affiliations: Independent

Patrick Desmond Lehane (died 1 July 1976) was an Irish politician. A farmer by profession, he was an unsuccessful candidate at the 1943 and 1944 general elections for the Cork South-East constituency. He was elected to Dáil Éireann at the 1948 general election as a Clann na Talmhan Teachta Dála (TD) for the Cork South constituency. He was re-elected at the 1951 general election as an Independent TD but lost his seat at the 1954 general election.

Dáil	Election	Deputy (Party)	Deputy (Party)	Deputy (Party)
13th	1948	Dan Desmond (Lab)	Seán Buckley (FF)	Patrick Lehane (CnaT)
14th	1951	Dan Desmond (Lab)	Seán Buckley (FF)	Patrick Lehane (Ind.)
15th	1954	Dan Desmond (Lab)	Seán McCarthy (FF)	Tadhg Manley (FG)
16th	1957	Dan Desmond (Lab)	Seán McCarthy (FF)	Tadhg Manley (FG)
17th	1961	Constituency abolished		
