= National Labour Party (Ireland) =

National Labour Party Páirtí Náisiúnta an Lucht Oibre
- Chairperson: Thomas Foran
- General Secretary: Seamus O'Farrell (1947)
- Leaders: William O'Brien; James Everett
- Founded: 1944
- Dissolved: 1950
- Split from: Labour Party
- Merged into: Labour Party
- Ideology: Social democracy; Anti-communism
- Union Affiliation: Irish Transport and General Workers' Union

The National Labour Party (Irish: Páirtí Náisiúnta an Lucht Oibre) was an Irish political party active between 1944 and 1950. It was founded in 1944 from a rebel faction of the Labour Party, inspired by the intransigence of the incumbent leadership of the Irish Transport and General Workers' Union (ITGWU) against the majority of the party on the basis that communists had infiltrated Labour at the turn of the 1940s.

== History ==
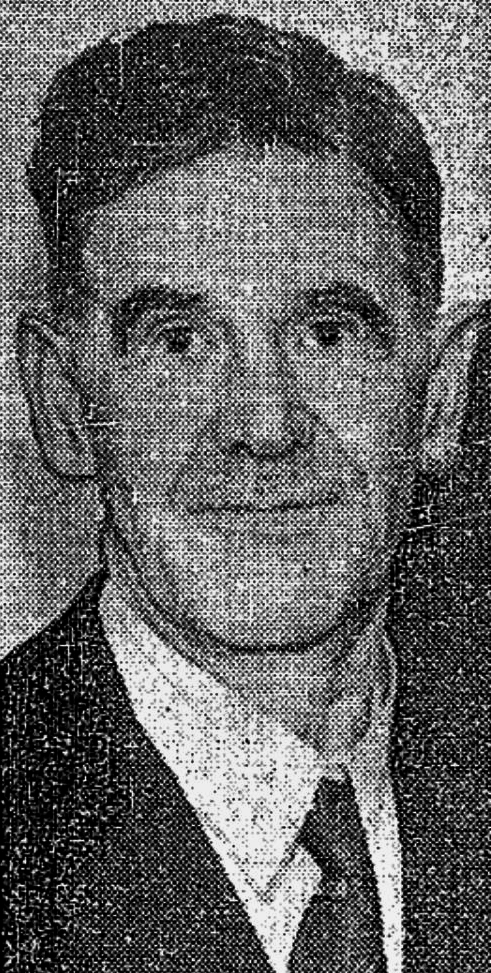
James Everett

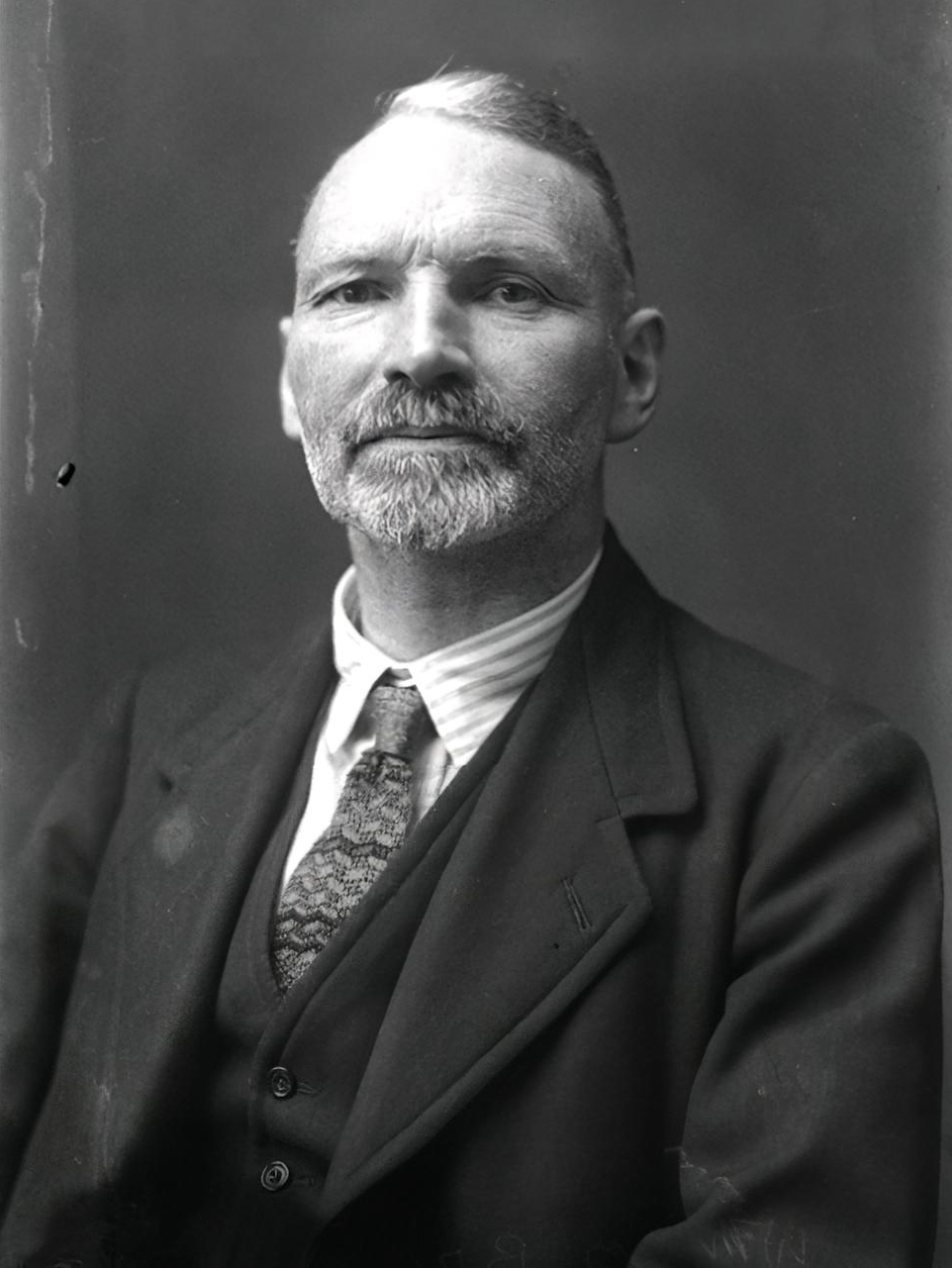
William O'Brien

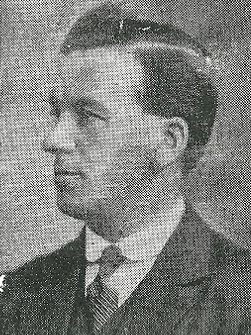
James Hickey

Everett, O'Brien and Hickey were amongst the most prominent members of the party

Foreign control of Irish affairs was resisted for 800 years by the Irish Nation. The rights of self-government could not have been won without the help of the Irish workers. The National Labour Party was founded to prevent control of the workers' political organisation passing into the hands of Communists and others with an alien outlook. The National Labour Party stands for full national and economic freedom for every citizen; for the full utilisation of the man-power and natural resources of this country in the interests of the whole people: for co-operation with all who are willing to strive for a social and economic system, Irish in inspiration and Christian in effect.

— National Labour Party manifesto, 1944 general election

The split in the Labour Party was preceded by divisions in the broader labour movement, specifically the Irish Transport and General Workers' Union under William O'Brien and the Workers' Union of Ireland under James Larkin. Larkin had rejoined the party in 1941, and two years later, he was nominated by the Dublin North-East branch of the Labour Party to contest the 1943 general election. The Administrative Council of the national party, with ITGWU members in the majority, refused to ratify this nomination. However, the Dublin party and Dublin-based candidates supported Larkin, as did Labour leader William Norton, and eventually Larkin was a victorious Labour candidate. When the ITGWU faction sought the expulsion of Dublin officials as revenge, it was routed. Two weeks later, the ITGWU disaffiliated from the Labour Party. Five of the eight TDs sponsored by the union resigned from the parliamentary party to form the National Labour Party in January 1944, led by William O'Brien and James Everett. Senator Thomas Foran was appointed chairman of the party. Foran was still recognised by other Labour senators as Leader of the Labour Party in the Seanad.

There was much bitterness between the two parties. The ITGWU claimed that communists had infiltrated the Labour Party. The ITGWU attacked "Larkinite and Communist Party elements" which it claimed had taken over the Labour Party. The split and the anti-communist assault put Labour on the defensive. Alfred O'Rahilly in The Communist Front and the Attack on Irish Labour widened the assault to include the influence of British-based unions and communists in the ITUC. The National Labour Party juxtaposed itself against this by emphasising its commitment to Catholic Social Teaching. Presiding at a meeting of the provisional executive of the party in March 1944, Thomas Foran expressed its "unqualified support" of Irish neutrality and condemned a declaration of the Communist Party of Ireland "expressing approval of the attempt to force this country to abandon neutrality." Senator Michael Colgan, a National Labour candidate speaking of the party in May 1944, claimed that "they had broken away from the Irish Labour Party because it was not Irish, nor did it fulful the expectations that an Irish labour party should have for the people." Speaking after Mass, Cork general election candidate P.J O'Brien claimed that "with the dissolution of the Communist Party of Ireland, these people (communists) are endeavouring to get a foothold on the Irish Labour Party."

Speaking at a National Labour delegate conference in October 1944, Everett stated that the Labour Party's attitude to Peadar Cowan's new openly communist organisation "The Vanguard" demonstrated how "helplessly the party leaders were caught in the Communist web" and "the individuals running the Vanguard were the same people who crashed into the party in 1942, founded the notorious Dublin Central branch and caused the party constitution to be torn up."

The Catholic press supported the ITGWU's allegations, which were founded on James Larkin's communist activities in groups like the Irish Worker League. The number of communists in the movement had increased since 1941, when the Communist Party of Ireland had disbanded and its members had joined the Labour movement. Based on conservative labour support, the National Labour Party won four seats in the 1944 election. At a meeting in Rathdowney, Labour politician William Davin criticised the new party in the aftermath of the election, referring to them as "disruptionist" and told his audience that he strongly resented being called a communist by "certain persons who did not bother to go to church or chapel either on Sundays or weekdays." In response, National Labour stated that "Mr Davin and his colleagues short-circuited any kind of unbiased inquisition by setting up a tribunal of their own on which those very people charged with complicity in the Communist fusion sat as the judges and assessors." Continuing, they said that "Mr Davin is not a Communist; no one in the National Labour Party either thought or said that he was." A failed attempt by the Labour Party to end the split occurred in May 1944. In June 1944, the Donegal News wrote that "Mr. Norton and his colleagues may well reflect that the advent of a National Labour Party puts an end to future Labour hopes of a come-back".

In 1947, National Labour criticised Labour's renewed calls for unity and that "failure to maintain unity within the Party occurred in 1943 when some members of the Administrative Council of the Party allowed themselves to be frightened or fooled into handing over control to a self-styled Dublin Executive, from whom they took their orders." They also stated that "those who wrecked the Labour Party four years ago, and had previously, by their policy of intrigue sought to make it their mouthpiece for Communist propaganda, cannot be permitted to continue their activities under cover of a democratic political organisation." National Labour also condemned the alleged influence of British trade unions in the Labour Party. Seamus O'Farrell was General Secretary of the National Labour Party that year.

National Labour won five seats in the 1948 election. After the election, the National Labour Party entered the First Inter-Party Government, against the wishes of the ITGWU. The party was in government with four other parties, including the Labour Party. National Labour was represented at cabinet level by James Everett, now its leader, as Minister for Posts and Telegraphs. Co-operation in government, the retirement of O'Brien and the death of Larkin removed the causes of animosity from the labour movement. In 1950, the National Labour Party folded back into Labour. In 1951, James Ryan of Fianna Fáil criticised National Labour's decision to re-join Labour.

== List of National Labour candidates ==
| Election | Constituency | Candidate | 1st Pref. votes | % |
|---|---|---|---|---|
| 1944 general election | Kerry North | Dan Spring | 8,429 | 24.7 |
| 1944 general election | Kilkenny | James Pattison | 6.239 | 21.7 |
| 1944 general election | Wexford | John O'Leary | 6,864 | 15.9 |
| 1944 general election | Wicklow | James Everett | 4,992 | 19.2 |
| 1948 general election | Carlow–Kilkenny | James Pattison | 4,707 | 10.3 |
| 1948 general election | Cork Borough | James Hickey | 4,507 | 10.0 |
| 1948 general election | Dublin North-Central | George Walker | 271 | 1.1 |
| 1948 general election | Dublin North-East | Frank Robbins | 476 | 1.1 |
| 1948 general election | Dublin North-East | Seán O'Moore | 440 | 1.0 |
| 1948 general election | Kerry North | Dan Spring | 5,877 | 16.3 |
| 1948 general election | Wexford | John O'Leary | 5,513 | 13.1 |
| 1948 general election | Wicklow | James Everett | 4,834 | 18.3 |

== General election results ==
| Election | Seats won | ± | Position | First Pref votes | % | Government | Leader |
|---|---|---|---|---|---|---|---|
| 1944 | 4 / 138 | ▲4 | ▲5th | 32,732 | 2.7% | Opposition | James Everett |
| 1948 | 5 / 147 | ▲1 | ▼6th | 34,015 | 2.6% | Coalition (FG-LP-CnP-CnT-NLP) | James Everett |

== See also ==
- Category:National Labour Party (Ireland) politicians
- Democratic Labor Party (similar Anti communist labor split party in 1950s Australia)

== Sources ==
- Barberis, Peter, John McHugh and Mike Tyldesley. Encyclopedia of British and Irish Political Organisations. London: Continuum International Publishing Group, 2005 ISBN 0-8264-5814-9, ISBN 978-0-8264-5814-8
- Manning, Maurice. Irish Political Parties: An Introduction. Dublin: Gill and Macmillan, 1972 ISBN 978-0-7171-0536-6
