= Electoral (Amendment) Act 1969 =

Constituencies in use at Dáil elections from 1969 to 1977

Oireachtas
- Long title: AN ACT TO FIX THE NUMBER OF MEMBERS OF DÁIL ÉIREANN AND TO REVISE THEIR CONSTITUENCIES AND TO AMEND THE LAW RELATING TO THE ELECTION OF SUCH MEMBERS.
- Citation: No. 3 of 1969
- Signed: 26 March 1969
- Commenced: 26 March 1969 & 22 May 1969
- Repealed: 25 May 1977

Legislative history
- Bill citation: No. 35 of 1968
- Introduced by: Minister for Local Government (Kevin Boland)
- Introduced: 23 October 1968

Repeals
- Electoral (Amendment) Act 1961

Repealed by
- Electoral (Amendment) Act 1974
- Status: Repealed

The Electoral (Amendment) Act 1969 (No. 3) was a law of Ireland which revised Dáil constituencies. It took effect on the dissolution of the 18th Dáil on 22 May 1969 and a general election for the 19th Dáil on the revised constituencies took place on 18 June 1969.

This Act repealed the Electoral (Amendment) Act 1961, which had defined constituencies since the 1961 general election. It ended the distinction between borough constituencies in the cities of Cork and Dublin and county constituencies elsewhere.

The constituencies were also used at the general election for the 20th Dáil held on 28 February 1973.

It was itself repealed by the Electoral (Amendment) Act 1974, which created a new schedule of constituencies first used at the 1977 general election for the 21st Dáil held on 16 June 1977.

== Constituencies ==
Constituency	Seats
Carlow–Kilkenny	5
Cavan	3
Clare	3
Clare–South Galway	3
Cork City North-West	3
Cork City South-East	3
Cork Mid	4
Cork North-East	4
Cork South-West	3
Donegal North-East	3
Donegal–Leitrim	3
Dublin Central	4
Dublin County North	4
Dublin County South	3
Dublin North-Central	4
Dublin North-East	4
Dublin North-West	4
Dublin South-Central	4
Dublin South-East	3
Dublin South-West	4
Dún Laoghaire and Rathdown	4
Galway North-East	3
Galway West	3
Kerry North	3
Kerry South	3
Kildare	3
Laoighis–Offaly	5
Limerick East	4
Limerick West	3
Longford–Westmeath	4
Louth	3
Mayo East	3
Mayo West	3
Meath	3
Monaghan	3
Roscommon–Leitrim	3
Sligo–Leitrim	3
Tipperary North	3
Tipperary South	4
Waterford	3
Wexford	4
Wicklow	3
Total	144

== See also ==
- Elections in the Republic of Ireland
