= Martin Roddy =

Irish politician (1883–1948)

Parliamentary Secretary
- 1927–1932: Lands and Fisheries

Teachta Dála
- In office June 1943 – 8 January 1948
- In office July 1937 – June 1938
- Constituency: Sligo
- In office March 1925 – July 1937
- Constituency: Leitrim–Sligo

Personal details
- Born: 9 December 1883 County Sligo, Ireland
- Died: 8 January 1948 (aged 64) County Sligo, Ireland
- Party: Fine Gael
- Other political affiliations: Cumann na nGaedheal
- Relatives: Joseph Roddy (brother)
- Education: Summerhill College

Martin Roddy (9 December 1883 – 8 January 1948) was an Irish politician, newspaper editor and company director.

== Early and personal life ==
Roddy was born on 9 December 1883 at Kilmacowen, County Sligo, the eldest son among at least four sons and two daughters of Patrick Roddy, a farmer, and Jane Roddy (née O'Hara). He was educated at the local national school and at Summerhill College, Sligo town.

He entered the British civil service and was assigned to duty in London. He was active in Irish nationalist organisations, and was honorary secretary of the London branch of the Gaelic League, and became a fluent Irish-speaker. During the World War I he resigned his post and returned to Ireland, eventually becoming involved with Sinn Féin. He never married.

== Business career ==
Roddy was joint managing director of Champion Publications, which in 1933 acquired two provincial newspapers, The Sligo Champion and the People's Press (Lifford, County Donegal). Becoming sole managing director and secretary in 1935, he edited both journals till his death. He enlarged the Champion in size and scope, and substantially increased circulation.

== Political career ==
He was elected in 1920 to Sligo Rural District Council – serving as chairman from 1922 to 1925. He was also a member of Sligo County Council from 1921 to 1948; and its chairman from 1921 to 1928. A staunch supporter of the 1921 Anglo-Irish Treaty, he was defeated as a Farmers' Party candidate at the 1923 general election in the Leitrim–Sligo constituency, receiving 3.2% of the first preference vote.

He was first elected as a Cumann na nGaedheal Teachta Dála (TD) at the by-election held on 11 March 1925 for the Leitrim–Sligo constituency following the resignation of Alexander McCabe.

He was re-elected at the June 1927, September 1927, 1932 and 1933 general elections. He was elected as a Fine Gael TD for the new Sligo constituency at the 1937 general election. He lost his seat at the 1938 general election, but re-gained it at 1943 general election.

He was appointed as Parliamentary Secretary to the Minister for Lands and Fisheries in June 1927. He was appointed again in October 1927 after a general election. The position was renamed as Parliamentary Secretary to the Minister for Land and Fisheries in 1928, and he served till 1932.

He died on 8 January 1948 during the course of the 12th Dáil, which was dissolved on 12 January 1948, and no by-election was held for his seat. His brother Joseph Roddy served as a Fine Gael TD for Sligo–Leitrim from 1948 to 1957.

Political offices
New office	Parliamentary Secretary to the Minister for Lands and Fisheries; 1927–1932	Succeeded by Seán O'Grady

Dáil	Election	Deputy (Party)	Deputy (Party)	Deputy (Party)	Deputy (Party)	Deputy (Party)	Deputy (Party)	Deputy (Party)
4th	1923	Martin McGowan (Rep)	Frank Carty (Rep)	Thomas Carter (CnaG)	Seán Farrell (Rep)	James Dolan (CnaG)	John Hennigan (CnaG)	Alexander McCabe (CnaG)
4th	1925 by-election	Martin McGowan (Rep)	Frank Carty (Rep)	Samuel Holt (Rep)	Seán Farrell (Rep)	James Dolan (CnaG)	John Hennigan (CnaG)	Martin Roddy (CnaG)
5th	1927 (Jun)	John Jinks (NL)	Frank Carty (FF)	Samuel Holt (FF)	Michael Carter (FP)	James Dolan (CnaG)	John Hennigan (CnaG)	Martin Roddy (CnaG)
6th	1927 (Sep)	Bernard Maguire (FF)	Frank Carty (FF)	Samuel Holt (FF)	Patrick Reynolds (CnaG)	James Dolan (CnaG)	John Hennigan (CnaG)	Martin Roddy (CnaG)
6th	1929 by-election	Bernard Maguire (FF)	Frank Carty (FF)	Seán Mac Eoin (CnaG)	Patrick Reynolds (CnaG)	James Dolan (CnaG)	John Hennigan (CnaG)	Martin Roddy (CnaG)
7th	1932	Bernard Maguire (FF)	Frank Carty (FF)	Stephen Flynn (FF)	Mary Reynolds (CnaG)	William Browne (FF)	John Hennigan (CnaG)	Martin Roddy (CnaG)
8th	1933	Bernard Maguire (FF)	Frank Carty (FF)	Stephen Flynn (FF)	Patrick Rogers (NCP)	William Browne (FF)	James Dolan (CnaG)	Martin Roddy (CnaG)
9th	1937	Constituency abolished. See Sligo and Leitrim						

Dáil	Election	Deputy (Party)	Deputy (Party)	Deputy (Party)
9th	1937	Frank Carty (FF)	Martin Roddy (FG)	Patrick Rogers (FG)
10th	1938	Frank Carty (FF)	Martin Brennan (FF)	Patrick Rogers (FG)
11th	1943	Martin Roddy (FG)	Martin Brennan (FF)	Patrick Rogers (FG)
12th	1944	Martin Roddy (FG)	Martin Brennan (FF)	Patrick Rogers (FG)
13th	1948	Constituency abolished. See Sligo–Leitrim		
