= Sligo (Dáil constituency) =

Dáil constituency (1937–1948)

- Former Dáil constituency

Former constituency
- Created: 1937
- Abolished: 1948
- Seats: 3
- Local government area: County Sligo
- Created from: Leitrim–Sligo
- Replaced by: Sligo–Leitrim

Sligo was a parliamentary constituency represented in Dáil Éireann, the lower house of the Irish parliament or Oireachtas from 1937 to 1948. The constituency elected 3 deputies (Teachtaí Dála, commonly known as TDs) to the Dáil, on the system of proportional representation by means of the single transferable vote (PR-STV).

== History ==
The constituency was created for the 1937 general election, when the Electoral (Revision of Constituencies) Act 1935 split the old Leitrim–Sligo constituency, with County Leitrim being represented from 1937 through the new Leitrim constituency.

Under the Electoral (Amendment) Act 1947, the Sligo constituency was abolished, and the Sligo–Leitrim constituency was created for the 1948 general election.

== Boundaries ==
Some Dáil constituencies cross county boundaries, in order to ensure a reasonably consistent ratio of electors to TDs. The Electoral (Revision of Constituencies) Act 1935 defined the boundaries of the Sligo constituency as being:

"The administrative County of Sligo except the portion thereof which is comprised in the County Constituency of Leitrim."

The boundaries of the Leitrim constituency were defined as:

"The administrative County of Leitrim and The District Electoral Divisions of: Ballintogher East, Ballynakill, Ballynashee, Cliffony North, Cliffony South, Drumcolumb, Killadoon, Kilmactranny, Rossinver East and Shancough in the administrative County of Sligo."

== TDs ==
Teachtaí Dála (TDs) for Sligo 1937–1948
Key to parties: FF = Fianna Fáil; FG = Fine Gael
Dáil	Election	Deputy (Party)	Deputy (Party)	Deputy (Party)
9th	1937	Frank Carty (FF)	Martin Roddy (FG)	Patrick Rogers (FG)
10th	1938	Frank Carty (FF)	Martin Brennan (FF)	Patrick Rogers (FG)
11th	1943	Martin Roddy (FG)	Martin Brennan (FF)	Patrick Rogers (FG)
12th	1944	Martin Roddy (FG)	Martin Brennan (FF)	Patrick Rogers (FG)
13th	1948	Constituency abolished. See Sligo–Leitrim		

Note: The columns in this table are used only for presentational purposes, and no significance should be attached to the order of columns. For details of the order in which seats were won at each election, see the detailed results of that election.

== Elections ==
*: Outgoing TD

=== 1944 general election ===
1944 general election: Sligo
Party	Candidate	FPv%	Count		
Party	Candidate	FPv%	1	2	3
Fianna Fáil	Martin Brennan	28.8	7,532		
Fine Gael	Martin Roddy	24.8	6,485	6,530	
Fine Gael	Patrick Rogers	20.2	5,288	5,354	6,655
Labour	Michael Nevin	13.2	3,453	3,561	
Fianna Fáil	Frank O'Beirne	12.9	3,359	4,142	5,495
Electorate: 36,777 Valid: 26,117 Quota: 6,530 Turnout: 71.0%

=== 1943 general election ===
1943 general election: Sligo
Party	Candidate	FPv%	Count					
Party	Candidate	FPv%	1	2	3	4	5	6
Fianna Fáil	Martin Brennan	24.5	6,888	6,921	7,253			
Fine Gael	Patrick Rogers	16.4	4,606	4,803	4,867	4,876	4,993	6,136
Fine Gael	Martin Roddy	16.2	4,555	5,424	5,702	5,721	5,951	6,949
Labour	Michael Nevin	11.8	3,320	3,501	3,649	3,675	5,041	5,462
Fianna Fáil	Peadar Glynn	9.6	2,688	2,731	2,796	2,933		
Clann na Talmhan	William Gormley	8.5	2,397	2,474	3,620	3,663	3,882	
Clann na Talmhan	Michael Hanley	7.7	2,163	2,205				
Fine Gael	Thomas McGoldrick	5.2	1,458					
Electorate: 36,777 Valid: 28,075 Quota: 7,019 Turnout: 76.3%

=== 1938 general election ===
1938 general election: Sligo
Party	Candidate	FPv%	Count	
Party	Candidate	FPv%	1	2
Fianna Fáil	Martin Brennan	29.4	8,465	
Fine Gael	Patrick Rogers	26.6	7,667	
Fine Gael	Martin Roddy	22.0	6,336	6,424
Fianna Fáil	Frank Carty	22.0	6,319	7,499
Electorate: 36,049 Valid: 28,787 Quota: 7,197 Turnout: 79.9%

=== 1937 general election ===
1937 general election: Sligo
Party	Candidate	FPv%	Count			
Party	Candidate	FPv%	1	2	3	4
Fine Gael	Martin Roddy	24.0	6,755	6,899	9,518	
Fianna Fáil	Frank Carty	19.7	5,535	7,150		
Independent	Michael Brennan	17.5	4,936	5,736	6,024	6,077
Fine Gael	Patrick Rogers	16.0	4,514	4,544	5,092	7,486
Fine Gael	William Caffrey	13.0	3,672	3,757		
Fianna Fáil	William Browne	9.8	2,747			
Electorate: 36,516 Valid: 28,159 Quota: 7,040 Turnout: 77.1%

== See also ==
- Dáil constituencies
- Politics of the Republic of Ireland
- Historic Dáil constituencies
- Elections in the Republic of Ireland
