= William Caffrey =

Irish politician

Senator
- In office 27 April 1938 – 7 September 1938
- Constituency: Agricultural Panel

Personal details
- Political party: Fine Gael

William John Caffrey was an Irish Fine Gael politician. He was a member of Seanad Éireann from April to September 1938. He was elected to the 2nd Seanad in April 1938 by the Agricultural Panel. He did not contest the August 1938 Seanad election.

He stood unsuccessfully for Dáil Éireann as a Fine Gael candidate for the Sligo constituency at the 1937 general election. He was a member of Sligo County Council from 1934 to 1945.
