= Electoral Act 1923 =

Electoral law of the Irish Free State

Oireachtas
- Long title: AN ACT TO REGULATE THE DÁIL AND SEANAD FRANCHISES IN SAORSTÁT EIREANN; TO AMEND AND CONSOLIDATE THE LAW RELATING TO THE REGISTRATION OF ELECTORS AND THE CONDUCT OF ELECTIONS TO DÁIL EIREANN; AND TO REGULATE THE CONDUCT OF ELECTIONS TO SEANAD EIREANN AND OF A REFERENDUM AND FOR OTHER PURPOSES CONNECTED THEREWITH.
- Citation: No. 12 of 123
- Territorial extent: Irish Free State (later Ireland)
- Assented to: 17 April 1923
- Commenced: 17 April 1923 & 9 August 1923

Legislative history
- Bill citation: Bill No. 1 of 1923
- Introduced by: Minister for Local Government (Ernest Blythe)
- Introduced: 18 December 1922

Amended by
- Electoral (Revision of Constituencies) Act 1935

Repealed by
- Electoral Act 1992
- Status: Repealed

The Electoral Act 1923 was a law in Ireland which established the electoral law of the Irish Free State and provided for parliamentary constituencies in Dáil Éireann.

== Franchise ==
Article 14 of the Constitution of the Irish Free State adopted on 6 December 1922 provided equal suffrage to men and women over the age of twenty-one. This was provided in the Electoral Act 1923. It also abolished plural voting: electors could be registered in only one constituency: the constituency in which he or she was ordinarily resident; the constituency in which he or she occupied business premises; or one of two university constituencies.

== Repeal ==
It was substantially replaced as the principal electoral legislation by the Electoral Act 1963. Its remaining provisions were repealed by a further revision and consolidation of electoral law in the Electoral Act 1992.

== Constituencies ==
This act replaced the constituencies defined in the Government of Ireland Act 1920, which had been in use at the 1921 election and the 1922 election. It also increased the number of seats in the Dáil by 25 from 128 to 153. These constituencies were first used at the 1923 election held on 27 August for the 4th Dáil.

The constituencies in the 1923 Act were in turn replaced by the Electoral (Revision of Constituencies) Act 1935, which came into effect on the dissolution of the 8th Dáil, and were first in use at the 1937 general election held on 14 June for the 9th Dáil. The two university constituencies were abolished at the same election by separate legislation.

Name	Seats	Contents or boundaries
Borough constituencies
Cork Borough	5	County borough of Cork and the county electoral area of Ballincollig
Dublin North	8	Borough electoral areas of Dublin No. 1, No. 2, No. 4, No. 6 and No. 8 in the county borough of Dublin
Dublin South	7	Borough electoral areas of Dublin No. 3, No. 5, No. 7, No. 9 and No. 10 in the county borough of Dublin
County constituencies
Carlow–Kilkenny	5	Administrative counties of Carlow and Kilkenny
Cavan	4	Administrative county of Cavan
Clare	5	Administrative county of Clare
East Cork	5	County electoral areas of Mallow and Cobh in the administrative county of Cork
North Cork	3	County electoral areas of Kanturk and Macroom in the administrative county of Cork
West Cork	5	County electoral areas of Bandon, Bantry and Dunmanway in the administrative county of Cork
Donegal	8	Administrative county of Donegal
Dublin County	8	Administrative county of Dublin
Galway	9	Administrative county of Galway
Kerry	7	Administrative county of Kerry
Kildare	3	Administrative county of Kildare
Leitrim–Sligo	7	Administrative counties of Leitrim and Sligo
Leix–Offaly	5	Administrative counties of Leix and Offaly
Limerick	7	Administrative county of Limerick and the county borough of Limerick
Longford–Westmeath	5	Administrative counties of Longford and Westmeath
Louth	3	Administrative county of Louth
North Mayo	4	County electoral areas of Ballina, Killala and Swinford in the administrative county of Mayo
South Mayo	5	County electoral areas of Castlebar, Claremorris and Westport in the administrative county of Mayo
Meath	3	Administrative county of Meath
Monaghan	3	Administrative county of Monaghan
Roscommon	4	Administrative county of Roscommon
Tipperary	7	Administrative counties of Tipperary North Riding and Tipperary South Riding
Waterford	4	Administrative county of Waterford and the county borough of Waterford
Wexford	5	Administrative county of Wexford
Wicklow	3	Administrative county of Wicklow
University constituencies
Dublin University	3	Degree holders and scholars
National University	3	Degree holders

== See also ==
- History of the franchise in Ireland
- Elections in the Republic of Ireland
