= Tim Pat Coogan =

Irish journalist, writer and broadcaster (born 1935)

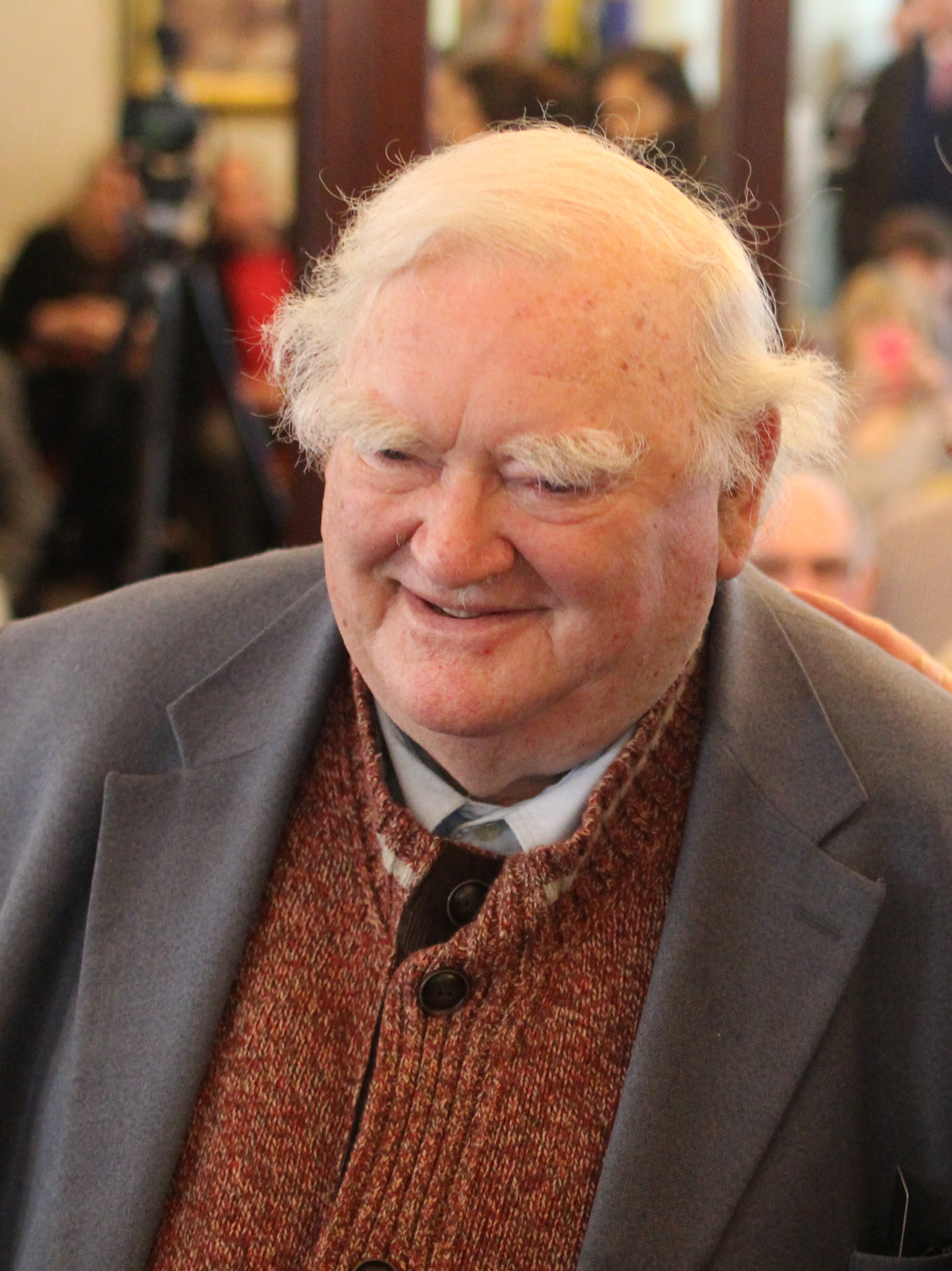
- Coogan in 2015
- Born: Timothy Patrick Coogan; 22 April 1935 (age 91); Monkstown, Dublin, Ireland
- Occupations: Journalist, writer, broadcaster
- Notable credit: Editor of The Irish Press (1968–1987)
- Spouse: Cherry Coogan (marriage dissolved)
- Children: 6 (five daughters, one son)

Timothy Patrick "Tim Pat" Coogan (born 22 April 1935) is an Irish journalist, writer and broadcaster. He served as editor of The Irish Press newspaper from 1968 to 1987. He has been best known for such books as The IRA, Ireland Since the Rising and On the Blanket, and biographies of Michael Collins and Éamon de Valera.

Coogan's particular focus has been Ireland's nationalist/independence movement in the 20th century, a period of unprecedented political upheaval. He blames the Troubles in Northern Ireland on "Paisleyism".

== Biography ==
Coogan was born in Monkstown, Dublin in 1935, the first of three children born to Beatrice (née Toal) and Ned Coogan. Ned (sometimes referred to as "Eamonn Ó Cuagain"), a native of Kilkenny, was an Irish Republican Army volunteer during the War of Independence and later served as the first Deputy Commissioner of the newly established Garda Síochána, then a Fine Gael TD for the Kilkenny constituency. Beatrice Toal, the daughter of a policeman, was a Dublin socialite who was crowned Dublin's Civic Queen of Beauty in 1927. She wrote for the Evening Herald and took part in various productions in the Abbey Theatre and Radio Éireann. Coogan spent many summer holidays in the town of Castlecomer in County Kilkenny, his father's home town.

A former student of the Irish Christian Brothers in Dún Laoghaire and Belvedere College in Dublin, he spent most of his secondary studies in Blackrock College in Dublin.

In 2000, Irish writer and editor Ruth Dudley Edwards was awarded £25,000 damages and a public apology by the High Court in London against Coogan for factual errors in references to her in his book Wherever Green is Worn: the Story of the Irish Diaspora. In the book, Coogan had written that Dudley Edwards had "grovelled to and hypocritically ingratiated herself with the English establishment to further her writing career". He also alleged that Dudley Edwards "had abused the position of chairwoman of the British Association for Irish Studies (BAIS) by trying to impose her political views on it" and that her commission to write True Brits had been awarded because of political favouritism.

When Taoiseach Enda Kenny caused confusion following a speech at Béal na Bláth by incorrectly claiming Michael Collins had brought Lenin to Ireland, Coogan commented: "Those were the days when bishops were bishops and Lenin was a communist. How would that have gone down with the churchyard collections?"

In November 2012, for reasons that are uncertain, the United States embassy in Dublin refused to grant Coogan a visa to visit the U.S. As a result, a planned book tour for his book (The Famine Plot, England's role in Ireland's Greatest Tragedy) was cancelled. After representations to then Secretary of State Hillary Clinton by United States Senator Charles Schumer (D-NY) and Congressman Peter T. King (R-NY), Coogan received his visa.

Coogan has been criticised by the Irish historians Liam Kennedy and Diarmaid Ferriter, as well as Cormac Ó Gráda, for a supposed lack of thoroughness in his research and bias.

== Bibliography ==
- Ireland since the Rising, 1966; ASIN B0000CMYHI
- The IRA, 1970; ISBN 0-00-653155-5
- The Irish: A Personal View, 1975; ISBN 978-0714816388.
- On the Blanket: The H Block story, 1980; Ward River Press - Dublin ASIN: B0013LSNEU. ISBN 0907085016. A paperback original, no hardcover was issued. First editions are uncommon in good condition. A controversial account of the "dirty protest" in the Ireland of the time.
- Ireland and the Arts, 1986.
- Disillusioned Decades: Ireland 1966–87, 1987; ISBN 978-0717114306.
- Coogan, Tim Pat (1990). Michael Collins : a biography. London: Macmillan. ISBN 978-0-09-174106-8.
- De Valera: Long Fellow, Long Shadow, 1993; ISBN 978-0099958604.
- The Troubles: Ireland's Ordeal 1966–1995 and the Search for Peace, 1995; ISBN 0-09-946571-X.
- Coogan, Tim Pat; Morrison, George (1998). The Irish Civil War. London: Weidenfeld & Nicolson.
- Wherever Green is Worn: The Story of the Irish Diaspora, 2000; ISBN 978-1403960146.
- 1916: The Easter Rising, 2001; ISBN 978-0753818527.
- Ireland in the Twentieth Century, 2003; ISBN 1-4039-6842-X
- Memoir, 2008; ISBN 978-0753826034.
- The Famine Plot: England's Role in Ireland's Greatest Tragedy, 2012; ISBN 978-0230109520.
- 1916: The Mornings After, 2015; ISBN 978-1784080099.
- The Twelve Apostles, 2016; ISBN 978-1784080136. An account of the Dublin-based assassination squad assembled by Michael Collins during the War of Independence.
- The GAA and the War of Independence,2018; ISBN 978-1786697035
