= Philip Mahony (politician) =

Irish politician (1897–1972)

Teachta Dála
- In office June 1943 – May 1944
- Constituency: Kilkenny

Personal details
- Born: 1 October 1897 County Kilkenny, Ireland
- Died: 20 April 1972 (aged 74)
- Party: Clann na Talmhan

Philip Mahony (1 October 1897 – 20 April 1972) was an Irish Clann na Talmhan politician. A farmer by profession, he was elected to Dáil Éireann as a Clann na Talmhan Teachta Dála (TD) for the Kilkenny constituency at the 1943 general election. He was defeated at the 1944 general election.

Dáil	Election	Deputy (Party)	Deputy (Party)	Deputy (Party)
9th	1937	James Pattison (Lab)	Thomas Derrig (FF)	Denis Gorey (FG)
10th	1938	James Pattison (Lab)	Thomas Derrig (FF)	Denis Gorey (FG)
11th	1943	James Pattison (Lab)	Thomas Derrig (FF)	Philip Mahony (CnaT)
12th	1944	James Pattison (NLP)	Thomas Derrig (FF)	Eamonn Coogan (FG)
13th	1948	Constituency abolished. See Carlow–Kilkenny		
