= James Everett (politician) =

Irish politician (1894–1967)

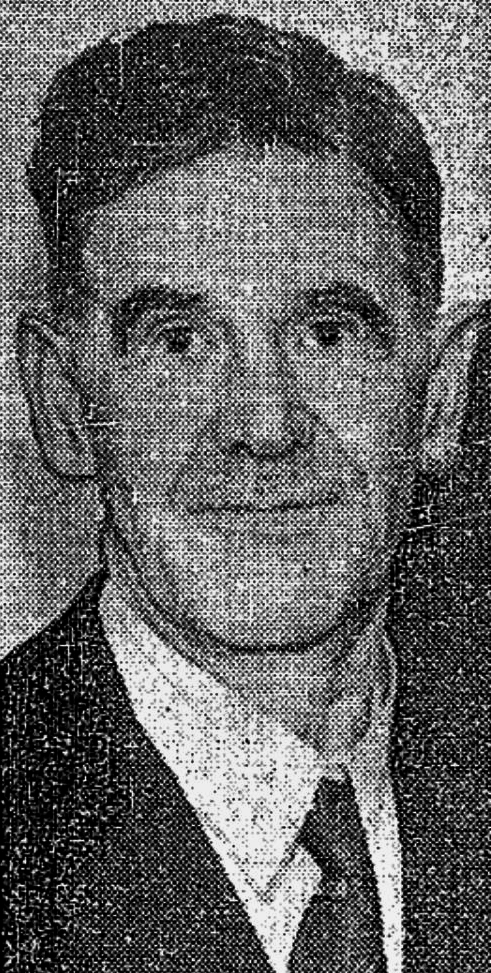
- Everett in 1949

Minister for Justice
- In office 2 June 1954 – 20 March 1957
- Taoiseach: John A. Costello
- Preceded by: Gerald Boland
- Succeeded by: Oscar Traynor

Minister for Posts and Telegraphs
- In office 18 February 1948 – 13 June 1951
- Taoiseach: John A. Costello
- Preceded by: Patrick Little
- Succeeded by: Erskine H. Childers

Leader of the National Labour Party
- In office 23 March 1944 – 19 August 1950
- Preceded by: New postilion
- Succeeded by: Position abolished

Teachta Dála
- In office August 1923 – 18 December 1967
- Constituency: Wicklow
- In office June 1922 – August 1923
- Constituency: Kildare–Wicklow

Personal details
- Born: 14 February 1890 Rathdrum, County Wicklow, Ireland
- Died: 18 December 1967 (aged 77) Bray, County Wicklow, Ireland
- Party: Labour Party
- Other political affiliations: National Labour Party (1944–1950)
- Spouse: Ellen Olahan

James Everett (14 February 1890 – 18 December 1967) was an Irish Labour Party politician who served as Minister for Justice from 1954 to 1957, Minister for Posts and Telegraphs from 1948 to 1951 and Leader of the National Labour Party from 1944 to 1950. He served as a Teachta Dála (TD) from 1922 to 1967.

He was leader of the short-lived National Labour Party, which briefly split away from the Labour Party over a dispute relating to support for James Larkin as a candidate in Dublin.

== Career ==
On leaving school Everett became an organiser with County Wicklow Agricultural Union, which later merged with the ITGWU. He was a member of Sinn Féin and served as a justice in the Republican courts for Kildare and Wicklow from 1919. He was first elected to Dáil Éireann in 1922 as a Labour Party TD for Kildare–Wicklow constituency. From the 1923 general election until his death, he was elected for the Wicklow. Everett was one of the six TDs who left the Labour Party in 1944, because of its alleged infiltration by communists, and formed the National Labour Party. Everett became the leader of the new party.

In 1948, the National Labour Party joined the Cabinet of John A. Costello in the First Inter-Party Government and Everett was appointed Minister for Posts and Telegraphs. In 1950, Everett, as Minister for Posts and Telegraphs became involved in a bizarre incident known as the "Battle of Baltinglass." Everett appointed Michael Farrell as sub-postmaster in the local post office. The office had been run by Helen Cooke for her invalid aunt, whose family had held the position since 1870. Local feeling ran high in support of Cooke, with telegraph poles being cut to prove their point. Allegations of political jobbery were denied but Everett's actions became a national issue. Farrell resigned in December 1950 and Everett bowed to the pressure and appointed Cooke. It is believed that the Baltinglass affair contributed to the downfall of the Inter-Party government in 1951.

Also in 1950, during the First Inter-Party Government's tenure, the Labour Party and the National Labour Party reunited. Everett served in government again between 1954 and 1957 as Minister for Justice and in that capacity he granted Albert Luykx Irish citizenship. Everett died aged 77, during the 1967 Dáil Christmas Recess. He had 44 years service as a TD, and was joint Father of the Dáil with Frank Aiken and Paddy Smith.

Political offices
New political party	Leader of the National Labour Party; 1944–1950	Succeeded by Party disbanded
Preceded by Patrick Little	Minister for Posts and Telegraphs; 1948–1951	Succeeded by Erskine H. Childers
Preceded by Gerald Boland	Minister for Justice; 1954–1957	Succeeded by Oscar Traynor

Dáil	Election	Deputy (Party)	Deputy (Party)	Deputy (Party)	Deputy (Party)	Deputy (Party)
2nd	1921	Erskine Childers (SF)	Domhnall Ua Buachalla (SF)	Robert Barton (SF)	Christopher Byrne (SF)	Art O'Connor (SF)
3rd	1922	Hugh Colohan (Lab)	James Everett (Lab)	Robert Barton (AT-SF)	Christopher Byrne (PT-SF)	Richard Wilson (FP)
4th	1923	Constituency abolished. See Kildare and Wicklow				

Dáil	Election	Deputy (Party)	Deputy (Party)	Deputy (Party)	Deputy (Party)	Deputy (Party)
4th	1923	Christopher Byrne (CnaG)	James Everett (Lab)	Richard Wilson (FP)	3 seats 1923–1981	
5th	1927 (Jun)	Séamus Moore (FF)	James Everett (Lab)	Dermot O'Mahony (CnaG)	3 seats 1923–1981	
6th	1927 (Sep)	Séamus Moore (FF)	James Everett (Lab)	Dermot O'Mahony (CnaG)	3 seats 1923–1981	
7th	1932	Séamus Moore (FF)	James Everett (Lab)	Dermot O'Mahony (CnaG)	3 seats 1923–1981	
8th	1933	Séamus Moore (FF)	James Everett (Lab)	Dermot O'Mahony (CnaG)	3 seats 1923–1981	
9th	1937	Séamus Moore (FF)	James Everett (Lab)	Dermot O'Mahony (FG)	3 seats 1923–1981	
10th	1938	Séamus Moore (FF)	James Everett (Lab)	Patrick Cogan (Ind.)	3 seats 1923–1981	
11th	1943	Christopher Byrne (FF)	James Everett (Lab)	Patrick Cogan (CnaT)	3 seats 1923–1981	
12th	1944	Thomas Brennan (FF)	James Everett (NLP)	Patrick Cogan (CnaT)	3 seats 1923–1981	
13th	1948	Thomas Brennan (FF)	James Everett (NLP)	Patrick Cogan (Ind.)	3 seats 1923–1981	
14th	1951	Thomas Brennan (FF)	James Everett (Lab)	Patrick Cogan (Ind.)	3 seats 1923–1981	
14th	1953 by-election	Mark Deering (FG)	James Everett (Lab)	Patrick Cogan (Ind.)	3 seats 1923–1981	
15th	1954	Mark Deering (FG)	James Everett (Lab)	Paudge Brennan (FF)	3 seats 1923–1981	
16th	1957	James O'Toole (FF)	James Everett (Lab)	Paudge Brennan (FF)	3 seats 1923–1981	
17th	1961	Michael O'Higgins (FG)	James Everett (Lab)	Paudge Brennan (FF)	3 seats 1923–1981	
18th	1965	Michael O'Higgins (FG)	James Everett (Lab)	Paudge Brennan (FF)	3 seats 1923–1981	
18th	1968 by-election	Michael O'Higgins (FG)	Godfrey Timmins (FG)	Paudge Brennan (FF)	3 seats 1923–1981	
19th	1969	Liam Kavanagh (Lab)	Godfrey Timmins (FG)	Paudge Brennan (FF)	3 seats 1923–1981	
20th	1973	Liam Kavanagh (Lab)	Godfrey Timmins (FG)	Ciarán Murphy (FF)	3 seats 1923–1981	
21st	1977	Liam Kavanagh (Lab)	Godfrey Timmins (FG)	Ciarán Murphy (FF)	3 seats 1923–1981	
22nd	1981	Liam Kavanagh (Lab)	Godfrey Timmins (FG)	Ciarán Murphy (FF)	Paudge Brennan (FF)	4 seats 1981–1992
23rd	1982 (Feb)	Liam Kavanagh (Lab)	Godfrey Timmins (FG)	Ciarán Murphy (FF)	Gemma Hussey (FG)	4 seats 1981–1992
24th	1982 (Nov)	Liam Kavanagh (Lab)	Godfrey Timmins (FG)	Paudge Brennan (FF)	Gemma Hussey (FG)	4 seats 1981–1992
25th	1987	Liam Kavanagh (Lab)	Joe Jacob (FF)	Dick Roche (FF)	Gemma Hussey (FG)	4 seats 1981–1992
26th	1989	Liam Kavanagh (Lab)	Joe Jacob (FF)	Dick Roche (FF)	Godfrey Timmins (FG)	4 seats 1981–1992
27th	1992	Liam Kavanagh (Lab)	Joe Jacob (FF)	Liz McManus (DL)	Godfrey Timmins (FG)	Johnny Fox (Ind.)
27th	1995 by-election	Liam Kavanagh (Lab)	Joe Jacob (FF)	Liz McManus (DL)	Godfrey Timmins (FG)	Mildred Fox (Ind.)
28th	1997	Dick Roche (FF)	Joe Jacob (FF)	Liz McManus (DL)	Billy Timmins (FG)	Mildred Fox (Ind.)
29th	2002	Dick Roche (FF)	Joe Jacob (FF)	Liz McManus (Lab)	Billy Timmins (FG)	Mildred Fox (Ind.)
30th	2007	Dick Roche (FF)	Joe Behan (FF)	Liz McManus (Lab)	Billy Timmins (FG)	Andrew Doyle (FG)
31st	2011	Simon Harris (FG)	Stephen Donnelly (Ind.)	Anne Ferris (Lab)	Billy Timmins (FG)	Andrew Doyle (FG)
32nd	2016	Simon Harris (FG)	Stephen Donnelly (SD)	John Brady (SF)	Pat Casey (FF)	Andrew Doyle (FG)
33rd	2020	Simon Harris (FG)	Stephen Donnelly (FF)	John Brady (SF)	Jennifer Whitmore (SD)	Steven Matthews (GP)
34th	2024	Simon Harris (FG)	Edward Timmins (FG)	John Brady (SF)	Jennifer Whitmore (SD)	4 seats since 2024
