= 1948 Irish general election =

Election to the 13th Dáil

- 4 February 1948

147 seats in Dáil Éireann (Note: Including Frank Fahy (FF), returned automatically for Galway South as outgoing Ceann Comhairle, under Art. 16.6 of the Constitution and the Electoral (Chairman of Dáil Éireann) Act 1937, as adapted by the Electoral (Amendment) Act 1947.) 74 seats needed for a majority
- Turnout: 74.2% ▲5.0 pp
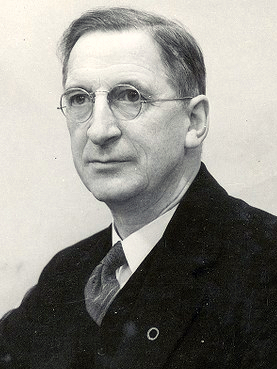

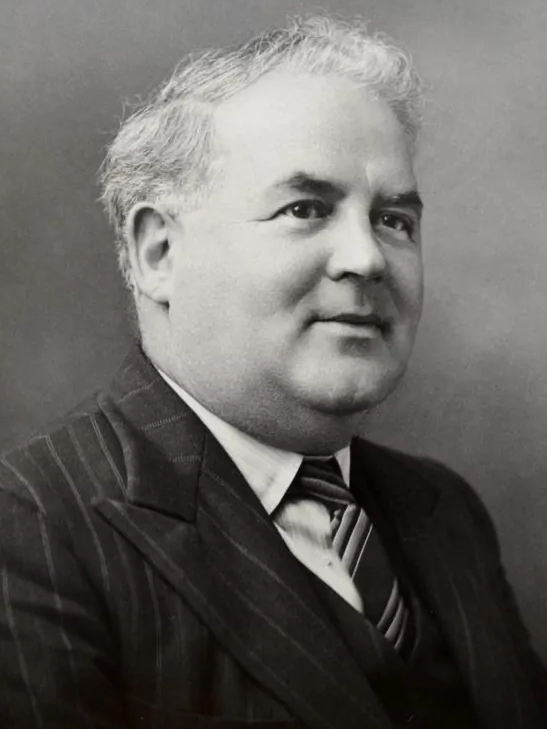

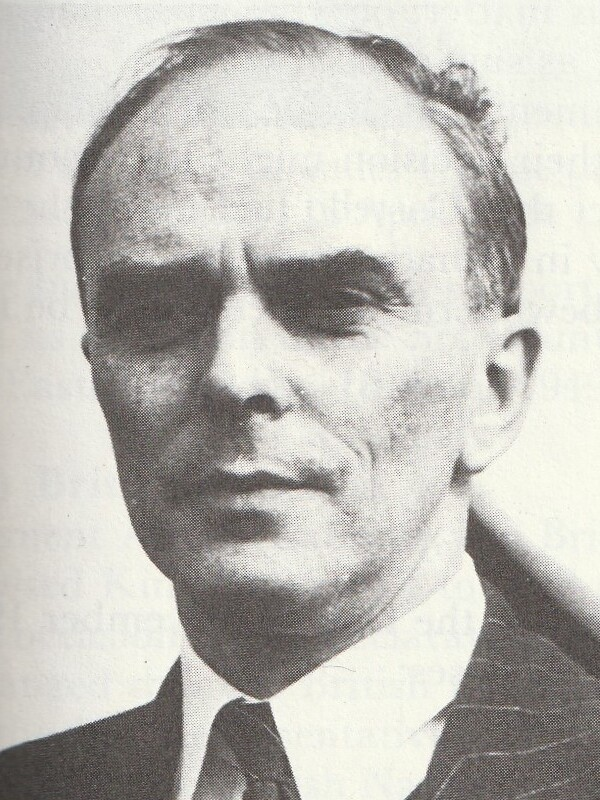

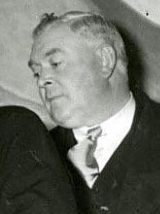

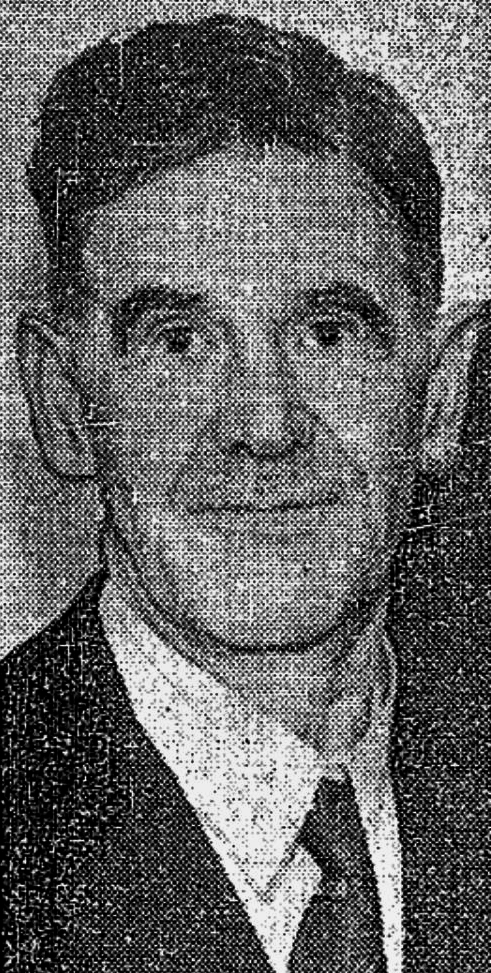
	First party	Second party	Third party
Leader	Éamon de Valera	Richard Mulcahy	William Norton
Party	Fianna Fáil	Fine Gael	Labour
Leader since	26 March 1926	1944	1932
Leader's seat	Clare	Tipperary South	Kildare
Last election	76 seats, 48.9%	30 seats, 20.5%	8 seats, 8.8%
Seats won	68	31	14
Seat change	▼8	▲1	▲6
Popular vote	553,914	262,393	115,073
Percentage	41.9%	19.8%	8.7%
Swing	▼7.0 pp	▼0.7 pp	▼0.1 pp
	Fourth party	Fifth party	Sixth party
Leader	Seán MacBride	Joseph Blowick	James Everett
Party	Clann na Poblachta	Clann na Talmhan	National Labour Party
Leader since	1946	1944	1944
Leader's seat	Dublin South-West	Mayo South	Wicklow
Last election	New party	9 seats, 10.1%	4 seats, 2.7%
Seats won	10	7	5
Seat change	▲10	▼2	▲1
Popular vote	174,823	73,813	34,015
Percentage	13.2%	5.6%	2.6%
Swing	▲13.2 pp	▼4.5 pp	▼0.1 pp
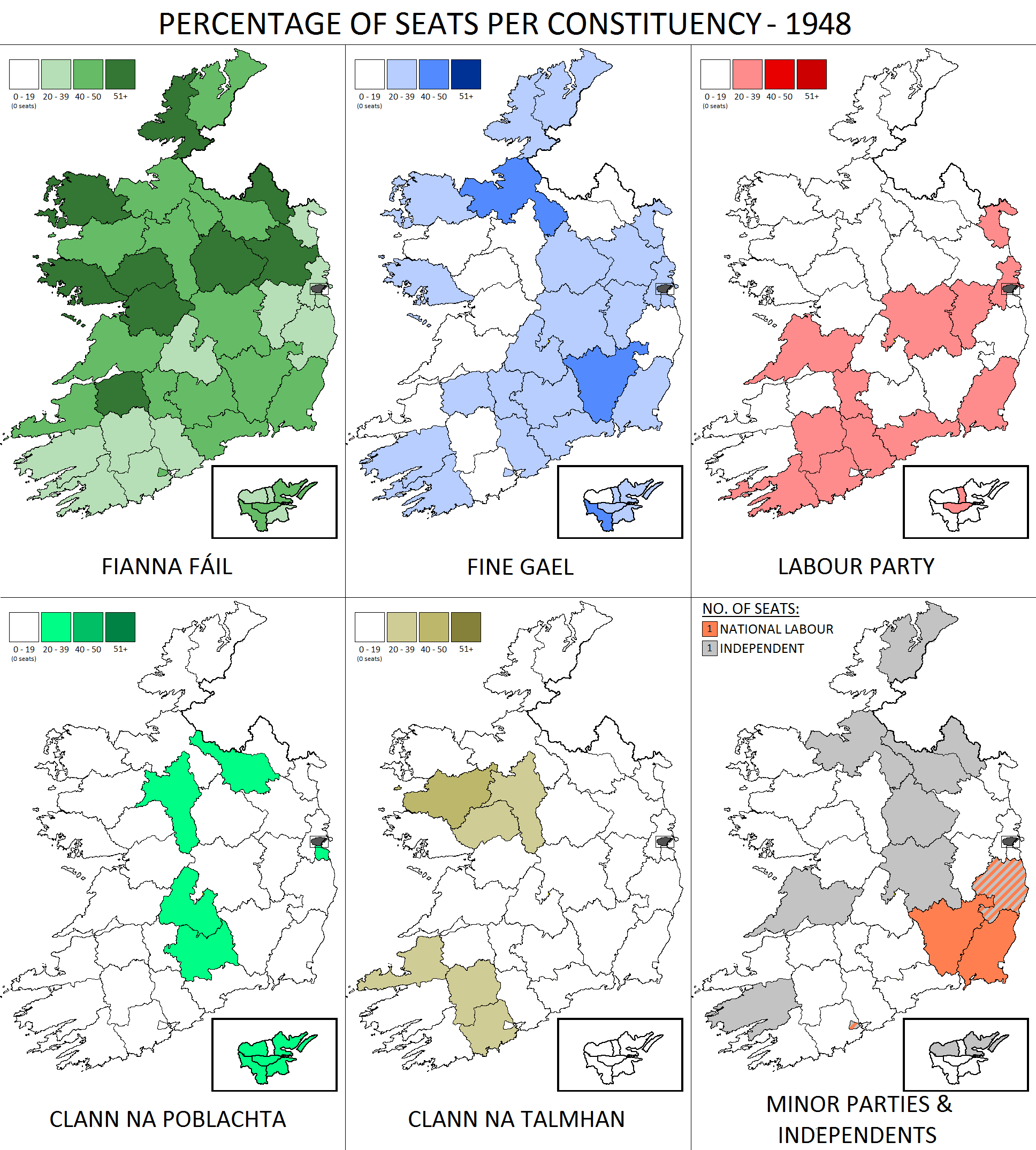
Taoiseach before election
Éamon de Valera
Fianna Fáil
Taoiseach after election
John A. Costello
Fine Gael

The 1948 Irish general election to the 13th Dáil was held on Wednesday, 4 February following the dissolution of the 12th Dáil on 12 January 1948 by the President Seán T. O'Kelly on the request of Taoiseach Éamon de Valera. The general election took place in 40 constituencies throughout Ireland for 147 seats in Dáil Éireann, the house of representatives of the Oireachtas. A revision of Dáil constituencies under the Electoral (Amendment) Act 1947 had increased the number of seats by 9 since the previous election. The election resulted in Fianna Fáil leaving government for the first time in 16 years and the formation of the first coalition government in Ireland.

The constituency of Carlow–Kilkenny voted on 8 February after the death during the campaign of Fine Gael candidate Eamonn Coogan TD. Another Fine Gael deputy in the same constituency, James Hughes, had died shortly before the dissolution.

The 13th Dáil met at Leinster House on 18 February to nominate the Taoiseach for appointment by the president and to approve the appointment of a new government of Ireland on the nomination of the Taoiseach. John A. Costello was appointed leading the first inter-party government, a five-party minority coalition.

This election was the last one before Ireland's withdrawal from the British Commonwealth and the declaration of the Republic of Ireland, which came into effect on 18 April 1949 under The Republic of Ireland Act 1948.

== Campaign ==
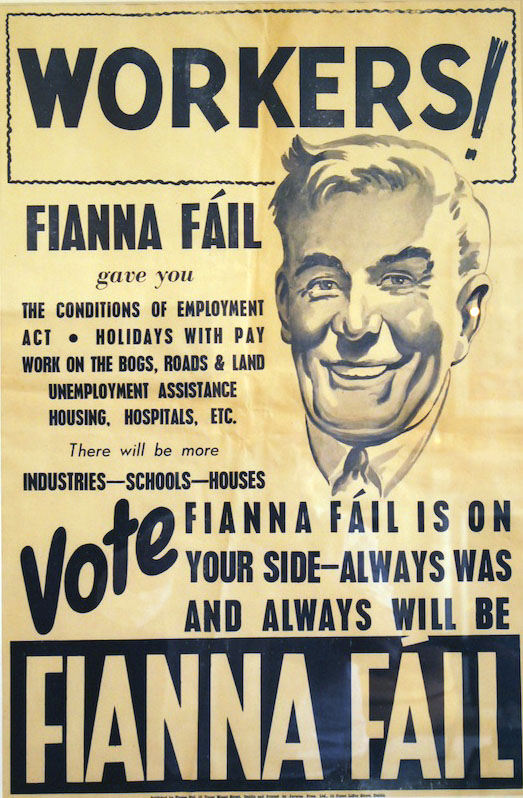
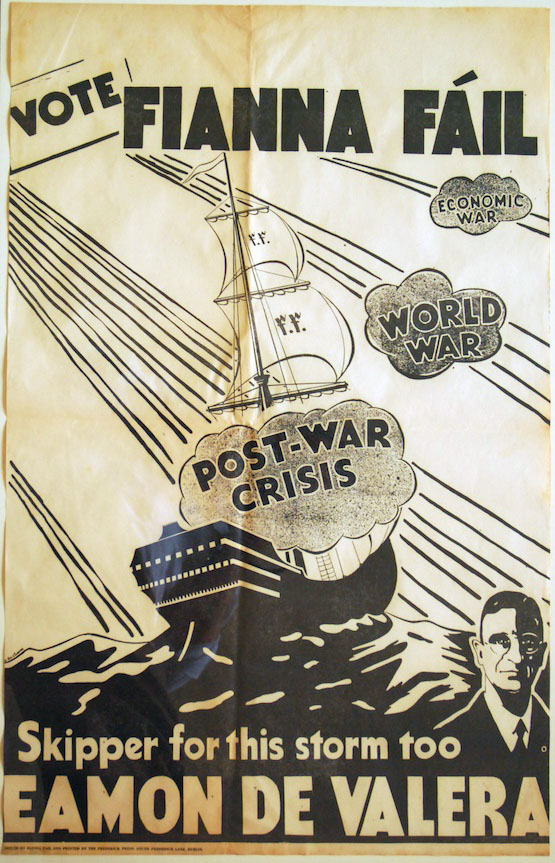
Fianna Fáil election posters from the campaign.

The general election of 1948 was called by the Taoiseach Éamon de Valera, in the hope of stopping the rise of a new party, Clann na Poblachta. In 1947 the rapid rise of Clann na Poblachta threatened the position of Fianna Fáil. The government of Éamon de Valera introduced the Electoral (Amendment) Act 1947 which increased the size of the Dáil from 138 to 147 and increased the number of three-seat constituencies from fifteen to twenty-two. The result was described by historian Tim Pat Coogan as "a blatant attempt at gerrymander which no Six County Unionist could have bettered."

Other issues were raised on the campaign that the parties had not foreseen. Fianna Fáil had enjoyed an uninterrupted sixteen years of dominance in government. Many people believed that the party had become stale and there was a strong desire for change. Although World War II had ended three years earlier, rationing continued, and massive inflation plagued the economy. A prolonged teachers' strike during the lifetime of the previous Dáil damaged the government due to its inability to settle the dispute. Bad weather added to the woes of the farmers, and poor harvests resulted in anger at the ballot box. Allegations that de Valera and Seán Lemass were involved in bribery and corruption raised questions about certain public officials.

Despite these issues, Fianna Fáil still expected to retain power. This prospect seemed very likely; however, an unlikely coalition was soon to be formed.

== Result ==
Election to the 13th Dáil – 4 February 1948
Party	Leader	Seats	±	% of seats	First pref. votes	% FPv	±%
Fianna Fáil	Éamon de Valera	68	–8	46.3	553,914	41.9	–7.0
Fine Gael	Richard Mulcahy	31	+1	21.1	262,393	19.8	–0.7
Labour	William Norton	14	+6	9.5	115,073	8.7	–0.1
Clann na Poblachta	Seán MacBride	10	New	6.8	174,823	13.2	–
Clann na Talmhan	Joseph Blowick	7	–2	4.7	73,813	5.6	–4.5
National Labour Party	James Everett	5	+1	3.4	34,015	2.6	–0.1
Monetary Reform	Oliver J. Flanagan	1	0	0.7	14,369	1.1	+0.3
Ailtirí na hAiséirghe		0	0	0	322	0.0	–0.5
Independent	N/A	11	+1	8.2	94,271	7.2	–0.6
Spoilt votes					13,185	—N/a	—N/a
Total		147	+9	100	1,336,628	100	—N/a
Electorate/Turnout					1,800,210	74.2%	—N/a

Fianna Fáil dropped 8 seats but remained the largest party. Clann na Poblachta secured ten seats instead of the nineteen they would have received proportional to their vote. The other parties remained roughly the same, with Fine Gael only gaining an extra seat.

=== Voting summary ===
First preference vote
Fianna Fáil	41.85%
Fine Gael	19.83%
Clann na Poblachta	13.21%
Labour	8.69%
Clann na Talmhan	5.58%
National Labour	2.57%
Monetary Reform	1.08%
Ailtirí na hAiséirghe	0.02%
Independent	7.12%

=== Seats summary ===
Dáil seats
Fianna Fáil	46.26%
Fine Gael	21.09%
Labour	9.52%
Clann na Poblachta	6.80%
Clann na Talmhan	4.76%
National Labour	3.40%
Monetary Reform	0.68%
Independent	7.48%

== Government formation ==
The election left de Valera six seats short of a majority in the 147-seat Dáil. Fianna Fáil had long refused to enter a formal coalition with another party, instead preferring confidence and supply agreements with other parties when it was short of an outright majority. This time, however, de Valera was unable to reach an agreement with National Labour and the Independents to form a government.

It seemed unlikely that the other political parties could unite to oust Fianna Fáil. Between them, they only had one seat fewer than Fianna Fáil. If they could get the support of at least seven independents, they would be able to form a government. On paper, such a motley coalition appeared politically unrealistic. However, a shared dislike of Fianna Fáil and de Valera overcame all other difficulties to knock Fianna Fáil from power for the first time in 16 years.

As the largest party in the coalition, it was a foregone conclusion that Fine Gael would provide the nominee for Taoiseach. However, republicans such as Seán MacBride refused to serve under Fine Gael leader, Richard Mulcahy, the man who had been the commander of the National Army during the civil war. Since the other parties would have been 17 seats short of a majority (and indeed, would have been 11 seats behind Fianna Fáil) without MacBride, Mulcahy stepped aside in favour of John A. Costello, a relatively unknown politician and former Attorney General. Mulcahy, who remained leader of Fine Gael, became Minister for Education. William Norton, the leader of the Labour Party became Tánaiste and Minister for Social Welfare.

On paper, this new coalition government looked weak and seemed unlikely to last. It consisted of a patchwork collection of political parties. There were young and old politicians, republicans and Free Staters, conservatives and socialists. The government's survival depended on a united dislike of Fianna Fáil, the skill of Costello as Taoiseach and the independence of various ministers.

The coalition lasted over three years from February 1948 to May 1951.

== Changes in membership ==
=== First time TDs ===
- Noël Browne
- James Collins
- Seán Collins
- Patrick Crotty
- Michael Davern
- Dan Desmond
- Seán Dunne
- Mick Fitzpatrick
- Joseph Hughes
- Seán Keane
- Michael F. Kitt
- Robert Lahiffe
- Con Lehane
- Patrick Lehane
- Jack Lynch
- Patrick McGrath
- Jack McQuillan
- Patrick Maguire
- Patrick O'Gorman
- Michael O'Higgins
- Tom O'Higgins
- John Ormonde
- Joseph Roddy
- Éamon Rooney
- Michael Sheehan
- Gerard Sweetman
- John Tully
- Thomas Walsh
- Eugene Gilbride

=== Re-elected TDs ===
- Sir John Esmonde, bt
- James Hickey

=== Retiring TDs ===
- William Broderick
- Frank Daly
- Peter O'Loghlen

=== Defeated TDs ===
- Andrew Fogarty
- Walter Furlong
- Frank Loughman
- John S. O'Connor
- Patrick Shanahan
- Leo Skinner
- Laurence Walsh

== Seanad election ==
The election was followed by an election to the 6th Seanad.
