= 1999 Kilkenny County Council election =

Part of the 1999 Irish local elections

← 1991	10 June 1999	2004 →

All 26 seats to Kilkenny County Council
	First party	Second party	Third party
Party	Fianna Fáil	Fine Gael	Labour
Seats won	12	11	1
Seat change	0	+1	-3
	Fourth party
Party	Independent
Seats won	2
Seat change	+2
- Map showing the area of Kilkenny County Council
Council control before election
Fine Gael
Labour Party
Council control after election
Fianna Fáil
Independents

An election to Kilkenny County Council took place on 10 June 1999 as part of that year's Irish local elections. 26 councillors were elected from five local electoral areas on the system of proportional representation by means of the single transferable vote (PR-STV) for a five-year term of office.

== Results by party ==
Party	Seats	±	First Pref. votes	FPv%	±%
Fianna Fáil	12	0	14,216	43.46	
Fine Gael	11	+1	10,855	33.18	
Labour	1	-3	3,601	11.01	
Independent	2	+2	2,055	6.28	
Totals	26	0	32,714	100.00	—

== Results by local electoral area ==
=== Ballyragget ===
Ballyragget - 5 seats
Party	Candidate	FPv%	Count					
Party	Candidate	FPv%	1	2	3	4	5	6
Fine Gael	Mary Hilda Cavanagh*	22.21	1,431					
Fine Gael	Dan Brennan*	12.68	817	859	876	908	957	962
Labour	Maurice Shortall	12.23	788	802	844	892	940	944
Fianna Fáil	Pat Millea*	11.66	751	812	945	1,359		
Fianna Fáil	Martin Carroll	11.61	748	756	965	1,087		
Fine Gael	Catherine Connery	10.32	665	753	873	917	953	957
Fianna Fáil	Brigid Murphy*	10.00	644	664				
Fianna Fáil	Seán Warren	9.28	598	722	804			
Electorate: 10,997 Valid: 6,442 (58.58%) Spoilt: 105 Quota: 1,074 Turnout: 6,547 (59.53%)

=== Callan ===
Callan - 3 seats
Party	Candidate	FPv%	Count	
Party	Candidate	FPv%	1	2
Fianna Fáil	Liam Aylward TD	30.68	1,282	
Fianna Fáil	James Brett*	25.59	1,069	
Fine Gael	Tom Maher*	23.53	983	1,079
Fine Gael	Philip Brennan	16.28	680	786
Green	Phyllida Clarke	3.93	164	199
Electorate: 7,426 Valid: 4,178 (56.26%) Spoilt: 61 Quota: 1,045 Turnout: 4,239 (57.08%)

=== Kilkenny ===
Kilkenny - 7 seats
Party	Candidate	FPv%	Count								
Party	Candidate	FPv%	1	2	3	4	5	6	7	8	9
Fianna Fáil	John McGuinness TD*	19.41	1,678								
Fianna Fáil	John Coonan	13.34	1,153								
Labour	Joe Cody*	12.65	1,093								
Fine Gael	Phil Hogan TD*	12.07	1,043	1,104							
Fine Gael	Paul Cuddihy	9.27	801	852	861	867	869	928	979	991	1,150
Fianna Fáil	Michael Lanigan, Jnr	9.00	778	1,041	1,066	1,071	1,072	1,114			
Fine Gael	Pat Crotty	6.09	526	561	568	572	573	597	654	660	766
Independent	Teresa Mullen	6.00	519	556	563	565	566	596	698	702	865
Labour	Tony Patterson	4.81	416	473	480	483	489	545	625	634	
Fianna Fáil	John Eardly	4.27	369	445	459	461	462	492			
Progressive Democrats	John Murphy	3.09	267	284	287	288	288				
Electorate: 17,083 Valid: 8,643 (50.59%) Spoilt: 134 Quota: 1,081 Turnout: 8,777 (51.38%)

=== Piltown ===
Piltown - 6 seats
Party	Candidate	FPv%	Count							
Party	Candidate	FPv%	1	2	3	4	5	6	7	8
Fianna Fáil	Bobby Aylward*	16.79	1,105							
Fine Gael	Dick Dowling*	13.69	901	916	936	962				
Fine Gael	John Paul Phelan	10.91	718	734	757	771	777	831	850	910
Fianna Fáil	Cora Long	10.58	696	726	731	745	746	782	811	968
Fine Gael	Pat Dunphy	10.35	681	685	701	718	723	734	760	790
Fianna Fáil	Ann Blackmore*	9.47	623	670	678	696	697	730	742	895
Labour	Tomás Breathnach*	7.45	566	572	581	615	617	624	705	752
Fianna Fáil	Tommy Knox	6.81	448	461	465	479	481	605	669	
Workers' Party	Davy Walsh	4.09	269	272	276	313	316	325		
Fianna Fáil	Richard Fitzgerald	4.09	269	292	300	306	307			
Green	Afra Cronin	2.98	196	197	198					
Independent	Peter McDonald	1.64	108	113						
Electorate: 12,251 Valid: 6,580 (53.71%) Spoilt: 112 Quota: 941 Turnout: 6,692 (54.62%)

=== Thomastown ===
Thomastown - 5 seats
Party	Candidate	FPv%	Count							
Party	Candidate	FPv%	1	2	3	4	5	6	7	8
Independent	Dixie Doyle	15.07	922	943	947	982	1,004	1,073		
Fianna Fáil	Tom Brennan	11.46	701	709	713	766	776	971	987	1,032
Fine Gael	Billy Ireland*	11.13	681	703	708	731	828	872	876	926
Fine Gael	Andy Cotterell*	10.48	641	675	681	705	819	868	881	954
Fianna Fáil	Joan Murphy	8.34	510	513	551	586	651	775	786	1,078
Independent	Denis Coady	8.27	506	535	584	597	689	713	714	
Fianna Fáil	Kevin Fennelly*	8.16	499	510	513	588	602			
Labour	Michael O'Brien*	7.75	474	518	626	657	679	725	733	825
Fine Gael	John Meaney	6.54	400	414	459	465				
Fianna Fáil	Paddy Daly	4.69	287	304	306					
Labour	Thomas Prendergast	4.32	264	275						
Green	Kevin Knox	3.79	232							
Electorate: 10,825 Valid: 6,117 (56.51%) Spoilt: 95 Quota: 1,020 Turnout: 6,212 (57.31%)
