= 1991 Kilkenny County Council election =

Part of the 1991 Irish local elections

← 1985	27 June 1991	1999 →

All 26 seats on Kilkenny County Council
	First party	Second party	Third party
Party	Fianna Fáil	Fine Gael	Labour
Seats won	12	10	4
Seat change	+1	0	+1
	Fourth party	Fifth party
Party	Workers' Party	Independent
Seats won	0	0
Seat change	-1	-1
- Map showing the area of Kilkenny County Council
Council control after election
Fine Gael
Labour Party

An election to Kilkenny County Council took place on 27 June 1991 as part of that year's Irish local elections. 26 councillors were elected from five local electoral areas (LEAs) for a five-year term of office on the electoral system of proportional representation by means of the single transferable vote (PR-STV). This term was extended twice, first to 1998, then to 1999.

== Results by party ==
Party	Seats	±	First Pref. votes	FPv%	±%
Fianna Fáil	12	+1	13,981	43.19	
Fine Gael	10	0	10,787	33.33	
Labour	4	+1	5,178	16.00	
Workers' Party	0	-1	664	2.05	
Independent	0	-1	798	2.47	
Totals	26	-	32,369	100.00	—

== Results by local electoral area ==
=== Ballyragget ===
Ballyragget - 5 seats
Party	Candidate	FPv%	Count								
Party	Candidate	FPv%	1	2	3	4	5	6	7	8	9
Fine Gael	Mary Hilda Cavanagh*	16.5%	1,142	1,155							
Labour	Dick Brennan*	13.5%	931	981	988	1,011	1,049	1,191			
Fianna Fáil	John Murphy*	12.6%	870	874	933	959	1,043	1,271			
Fine Gael	John Brennan	11.5%	797	802	804	820	1,094	1,212			
Fianna Fáil	Martin Fitzpatrick	9.9%	682	685	758	882	902	967	1,033	1,059	1,089
Fianna Fáil	Patricia Owens	9.4%	650	653	661	677	698				
Fianna Fáil	Shem O'Donnell	8.8%	609	631	737	768	848	959	1,010	1,021	1,028
Fine Gael	Kathleen Conroy	7.4%	509	513	519	555					
Independent	Brid Phelan	4.5%	313	316	350						
Fianna Fáil	Michael Wilson	4.4%	304	306							
Labour	John Bergin	1.6%	111								
Electorate: 9,780 Valid: 6,918 (70.74%) Spoilt: 78 Quota: 1,154 Turnout: 6,996 (71.53%)

=== Kilkenny ===
Kilkenny - 4 seats
Party	Candidate	FPv%	Count						
Party	Candidate	FPv%	1	2	3	4	5	6	7
Labour	Seamus Pattison TD*	24.3%	1,130						
Fianna Fáil	Senator Michael Lanigan*	16.5%	765	792	815	834	842	995	
Fine Gael	Kieran Crotty*	15.4%	715	762	791	983			
Fianna Fáil	Michael McGuinness	14.6%	680	701	713	737	741	833	917
Fianna Fáil	Evelyn White	6.6%	306	322	342	361	366		
Fine Gael	Carmel Boyd	6.4%	299	319	329				
Independent	John Bolger*	6.3%	292	317	346	394	423	478	624
Workers' Party	Joe Butler	5.8%	268	299	362	376	383	409	
Fianna Fáil	Michael McGrath	4.2%	193	206					
Electorate: 8,088 Valid: 4,648 (57.47%) Spoilt: 39 Quota: 930 Turnout: 4,687 (57.95%)

=== Piltown ===
Piltown - 7 seats
Party	Candidate	FPv%	Count							
Party	Candidate	FPv%	1	2	3	4	5	6	7	8
Fianna Fáil	Liam Aylward TD*	23.6%	1,906							
Fine Gael	Dick Dowling*	15.2%	1,229							
Fine Gael	Andy Cotterell*	9.5%	763	812	896	914	931	1,069		
Labour	Joe Walsh	9.3%	750	795	814	1,045				
Fine Gael	John Maher*	8.6%	697	753	773	784	795	1,081		
Fianna Fáil	Marguerite Drea	6.6%	534	676	682	690	822	837	843	849
Fianna Fáil	Dick Dunphy*	6.4%	517	739	748	754	855	922	962	981
Fine Gael	Catherine Kearns	6%	482	508	563	579	596			
Fianna Fáil	Ann Blackmore	5.7%	456	678	682	702	823	858	884	890
Workers' Party	Martin Kennedy*	4.9%	396	421	434					
Fianna Fáil	Albert Byrne	4.2%	335	445	455	491				
Electorate: 12,979 Valid: 8,065 (62.14%) Spoilt: 106 Quota: 1,009 Turnout: 8,171 (62.96%)

=== Thomastown ===
Thomastown - 6 seats
Party	Candidate	FPv%	Count						
Party	Candidate	FPv%	1	2	3	4	5	6	7
Fianna Fáil	James Brett*	15.7%	1,179						
Labour	Michael O'Brien*	14%	1,055	1,061	1,075				
Fianna Fáil	Kevin Fennelly	12.3%	922	948	965	1,028			
Fine Gael	Billy Ireland*	11.1%	835	841	858	904	936	946	1,015
Fine Gael	Tom Maher	9.2%	692	701	717	780	940	960	991
Labour	John Bolger	8.6%	646	648	657	689	703	708	
Fine Gael	Philip Brennan*	8%	600	605	610	699	716	729	815
Fianna Fáil	Michael Fenlon*	7.6%	573	586	594	606	675	806	1,039
Fianna Fáil	Breda Somers*	6.6%	493	518	528	598			
Progressive Democrats	Patrick Crowley	4.7%	350	360	434				
Progressive Democrats	Donal McDonald	2.3%	175	177					
Electorate: 11,771 Valid: 7,520 (63.89%) Spoilt: 96 Quota: 1,075 Turnout: 7,616 (64.7%)

=== Tullaroan ===
Tullaroan - 4 seats
Party	Candidate	FPv%	Count						
Party	Candidate	FPv%	1	2	3	4	5	6	7
Fine Gael	Phil Hogan TD*	20.6%	1,073						
Fianna Fáil	Pat Millea*	14.4%	754	758	831	857	931	1,244	
Fianna Fáil	John McGuinness	12.1%	633	634	709	733	794	949	1,098
Fine Gael	Margaret Tynan*	11.1%	578	587	606	789	960	1,036	1,060
Labour	Tony Patterson	10.6%	555	557	580	647	739	789	816
Fianna Fáil	Joe Rice	9.1%	476	477	561	586	665		
Progressive Democrats	Martin Gibbons*	8.4%	436	438	473	534			
Fine Gael	Paul Cuddihy	7.2%	376	385	397				
Fianna Fáil	Tom Brennan*	6.5%	337	338					
Electorate: 8,832 Valid: 5,218 (59.04%) Spoilt: 49 Quota: 1,044 Turnout: 5,267 (59.64%)
