= 1985 Kilkenny County Council election =

Part of the 1985 Irish local elections

← 1979	20 June 1985	1991 →

All 26 seats on Kilkenny County Council
	First party	Second party	Third party
Party	Fianna Fáil	Fine Gael	Labour
Seats won	11	10	3
Seat change	-	-	-1
	Fourth party	Fifth party
Party	Workers' Party	Independent
Seats won	1	1
Seat change	-	+1
- Map showing the area of Kilkenny County Council
Council control after election
Fine Gael
Labour Party

An election to Kilkenny County Council took place on 20 June 1985 as part of the 1985 Irish local elections. 26 councillors were elected from five local electoral areas (LEAs) for a five-year term of office on the electoral system of proportional representation by means of the single transferable vote (PR-STV). This term was extended for a further year, to 1991.

== Results by party ==
Party	Seats	±	First Pref. votes	FPv%	±%
Fianna Fáil	11	-	14,722	44.77	
Fine Gael	10	-	11,631	35.37	
Labour	3	-1	3,509	10.67	
Workers' Party	1	-	1,644	5.00	
Independent	1	+1	1,370	4.17	
Totals	26	-	32,886	100.00	—

== Results by local electoral area ==
=== Ballyragget ===
Ballyragget: 5 seats
Party	Candidate	FPv%	Count						
Party	Candidate	FPv%	1	2	3	4	5	6	7
Fine Gael	Mary Hilda Cavanagh*		1,078	1,087	1,092	1,274			
Fianna Fáil	John Murphy*		1,058	1,063	1,097	1,188			
Fianna Fáil	Martin Fitzpatrick*		959	959	1,009	1,022	1,029	1,115	1,117
Labour	Dick Brennan*		851	946	1,044	1,067	1,074	1,146	1,149
Fine Gael	Thomas Coogan		680	734	776	950	1,043	1,135	1,149
Fianna Fáil	Martin Gibbons		660	666	743	799	807	1,109	1,121
Fine Gael	Kieran Brennan		529	558	566				
Fianna Fáil	Patricia Owens		442	464	586	599	601		
Fianna Fáil	Charles Brennan		432	454					
Fine Gael	John Brennan		249						
Electorate: 9,852 Valid: 6,938 (71.42%) Spoilt: 98 Quota: 1,157 Turnout: 7,036

=== Kilkenny ===
Kilkenny: 4 seats
Party	Candidate	FPv%	Count							
Party	Candidate	FPv%	1	2	3	4	5	6	7	8
Fine Gael	Kieran Crotty TD*		1,007	1,056						
Fianna Fáil	Sen. Michael Lanigan*		838	850	851	860	891	918	990	1,007
Labour	Seamus Pattison TD*		800	826	834	863	940	974	1,073	
Fianna Fáil	Michael McGuinness*		753	758	758	772	795	816	881	892
Independent	John Bolger		559	581	585	603	663	714	869	895
Independent	John Dalton		298	304	306	361	372	554		
Independent	Ken Coogan		266	269	270	327	333			
Workers' Party	Noel O'Farrell		198	201	201					
Fine Gael	Tom Crotty		195	217	243	250				
Fine Gael	Geraldine Maher		151							
Electorate: 8,160 Valid: 5,065 (63.87%) Spoilt: 147 Quota: 1,014 Turnout: 5,212

=== Piltown ===
Piltown: 7 seats
Party	Candidate	FPv%	Count								
Party	Candidate	FPv%	1	2	3	4	5	6	7	8	9
Fianna Fáil	Liam Aylward TD*		1,785								
Fine Gael	Dick Dowling TD*		1,212								
Workers' Party	Sean Walsh*		1,145								
Fianna Fáil	Eamonn Meade*		824	950	952	954	958	967	1,028	1,087	
Fine Gael	Andy Cotterell*		654	708	754	759	764	840	890	958	991
Fianna Fáil	Dermot Kavanagh		544	618	626	630	634	640	643	660	860
Fine Gael	John Maher		513	549	566	573	576	651	858	974	988
Fianna Fáil	Thomas Walsh		477	579	588	590	611	615	618	635	
Fianna Fáil	Dick Dunphy*		430	704	708	719	727	771	780	834	1,071
Labour	Desmond Scahill		326	347	354	441	459	469	505		
Fine Gael	Mick Wall		315	327	337	344	346	382			
Fine Gael	Joe Cummins		226	241	272	278	284				
Labour	John Mahon		127	134	138						
Electorate: 12,979 Valid: 8,588 (70.14%) Spoilt: 119 Quota: 1,074 Turnout: 8,707

=== Thomastown ===
Thomastown: 6 seats
Party	Candidate	FPv%	Count								
Party	Candidate	FPv%	1	2	3	4	5	6	7	8	9
Fianna Fáil	James Brett*		1,189								
Fianna Fáil	Breda Somers		768	790	821	828	834	1,075	1,103	1,114	
Fianna Fáil	Michael Fenlon*		636	650	670	692	808	920	958	965	993
Labour	Michael O'Brien*		629	631	729	740	968	1,029	1,184		
Fine Gael	Billy Ireland*		626	628	643	717	742	789	963	987	1,241
Fianna Fáil	John Fennelly*		579	598	622	622	631				
Fine Gael	Philip Brennan*		571	576	582	634	665	676	797	812	1,086
Fine Gael	Tom Maher*		568	576	583	647	650	665	737	751	
Fianna Fáil	Tom Quinn		553	559	564	627	637	732	762	767	812
Fine Gael	Joe Prendergast		463	464	498	614	638	662			
Labour	John Bolger		445	445	479	486					
Fine Gael	Frank Prendergast		427	428	431						
Workers' Party	Joe Doyle		301	302							
Electorate: 11,440 Valid: 7,755 (68.77%) Spoilt: 122 Quota: 1,108 Turnout: 7,867

=== Tullaroan ===
Tullaroan: 4 seats
Party	Candidate	FPv%	Count					
Party	Candidate	FPv%	1	2	3	4	5	6
Fine Gael	Phil Hogan*		1,377					
Fianna Fáil	Pat Millea		664	739	766	803	847	889
Fianna Fáil	Thomas Brennan*		581	609	646	696	749	827
Fianna Fáil	John McGuinness		550	566	614	686	732	761
Fine Gael	Margaret Tynan*		414	632	654	765	1,156	
Fine Gael	Thomas Vaughan		376	478	501	592		
Labour	Luke Boyle		331	356	410			
Fianna Fáil	Bobby Byrne		247	251				
Electorate: 7,523 Valid: 4,540 (60.93%) Spoilt: 44 Quota: 909 Turnout: 4,584
