= 2019 Kilkenny County Council election =

Part of the 2019 Irish local elections

- 24 May 2019

All 24 seats on Kilkenny County Council 13 seats needed for a majority
	First party	Second party	Third party
Party	Fianna Fáil	Fine Gael	Labour
Seats won	11	9	2
Seat change	▲1	▲2	Steady
	Fourth party	Fifth party
Party	Green	Independent
Seats won	1	1
Seat change	Steady	Steady
- Results by local electoral Area

An election to all 24 seats on Kilkenny County Council was held on 24 May 2019 as part of the 2019 Irish local elections. County Kilkenny was divided into 4 local electoral areas (LEAs) to elect councillors for a five-year term of office on the electoral system of proportional representation by means of the single transferable vote (PR-STV).

== Boundary review ==
Following a recommendation of the 2018 Boundary Committee, the boundaries of the LEAs were altered from those used in the 2014 elections.

== Overview ==
Fianna Fáil gained 1 additional seat to increase their numbers to 11 while also increasing their vote by 4%. Fine Gael gained 2 seats and also increased their vote by 2%. Labour and the Greens retained their previous position but it was a disastrous election for Sinn Féin. The party lost all 3 seats, including Sean Tyrell, the partner of Kathleen Funchion TD and saw a significant drop in their vote-share. Breda Gardner, a sitting Independent who also contested the Ireland South European Parliament constituency unsuccessfully, failed to retain her seat.

== Results by party ==
Party	Seats	±	1st pref	FPv%	±%
Fianna Fáil	11	▲1	15,895	41.11	▲3.91
Fine Gael	9	▲2	12,410	32.10	▲2.20
Labour	2	Steady	2,915	7.54	▼3.66
Green	1	Steady	1,485	3.84	▲0.34
Sinn Féin	0	▼3	2,458	6.36	▼3.54
People Before Profit	0	Steady	231	0.60	New
Independent	1	Steady	3,270	8.46	▲1.26
Total	24	Steady	38,664	100.00	

== Results by local electoral area ==
*: Outgoing councillor elected in 2014.
†: Outgoing councillor coopted subsequent to the 2014 election.

=== Callan–Thomastown ===
Callan–Thomastown: 6 seats
Party	Candidate	FPv%	Count						
Party	Candidate	FPv%	1	2	3	4	5	6	7
Fianna Fáil	Peter "Chap" Cleere	17.85%	1,945						
Fianna Fáil	Matt Doran	16.88%	1,839						
Fine Gael	Patrick O'Neill	12.84%	1,399	1,436	1,452	1,456	1,482	1,515	1,581
Fine Gael	Michael Doyle	12.65%	1,378	1,490	1,496	1,504	1,528	1,567	
Fine Gael	Joe Lyons	9.56%	1,042	1,047	1,146	1,152	1,220	1,330	1,388
Fianna Fáil	Deirdre Cullen	7.91%	862	1,020	1,095	1,116	1,151	1,234	1,426
Independent	Breda Gardner	7.54%	821	851	863	886	997	1,070	1,315
Sinn Féin	David Kennedy	6.68%	728	746	759	768	789	838	
Independent	Trish Finegan	3.35%	365	369	392	406			
Independent	John Kelly	3.32%	362	380	392	445	511		
Independent	Michael McGrath	1.04%	113	116	118				
Independent	John Carroll	0.38%	41	44	46				
Electorate: 19,643 Valid: 10,895 Spoilt: 182 Quota: 1,557 Turnout: 11,077 (56.39%)

=== Castlecomer ===
Castlecomer: 6 seats
Party	Candidate	FPv%	Count				
Party	Candidate	FPv%	1	2	3	4	5
Fianna Fáil	Pat Fitzpatrick	22.21%	2,249				
Fine Gael	Mary Hilda Cavanagh	16.66%	1,687				
Fianna Fáil	Michael McCarthy	15.71%	1,591				
Fine Gael	John Brennan	11.74%	1,189	1,413	1,493		
Labour	Denis Hynes (Note: See change below.)	10.84%	1,098	1,175	1,190	1,201	1,403
Fianna Fáil	Michael Delaney	9.73%	985	1,340	1,416	1,520	
Fine Gael	Pat O'Neill	8.09%	819	911	964	980	1,049
Sinn Féin	Joseph Kavanagh	5.01%	507	561	577	590	
Electorate: 19,146 Valid: 10,125 Spoilt: 233 Quota: 1,447 Turnout: 10,358 (54.1%)

=== Kilkenny ===
Kilkenny: 7 seats
Party	Candidate	FPv%	Count										
Party	Candidate	FPv%	1	2	3	4	5	6	7	8	9	10	11
Fianna Fáil	Andrew McGuinness	19.40%	1,860										
Green	Malcolm Noonan	15.49%	1,485										
Fianna Fáil	Joe Malone	13.26%	1,271										
Fine Gael	David Fitzgerald	12.01%	1,151	1,236									
Independent	Eugene McGuinness	8.62%	826	922	932	935	944	965	1,030	1,033	1,075	1,095	1,141
Fianna Fáil	John Coonan	7.28%	698	929	963	967	991	1,005	1,039	1,053	1,076	1,129	1,230
Sinn Féin	Sean Tyrrell	5.72%	548	616	632	641	649	666	689	691	760	813	836
Fine Gael	Martin Brett	5.00%	479	550	592	592	602	617	650	662	676	774	955
Fine Gael	Orla Kelly	3.22%	309	327	370	370	373	382	404	407	431		
Labour	Andrea Cleere	3.14%	301	325	382	384	387	411	426	428	495	582	
Independent	Luke O'Connor	2.46%	236	252	266	273	284	301					
People Before Profit	Stephanie Hanlon	2.41%	231	258	298	300	302	349	370	371			
Independent	Enya Kennedy	1.68%	161	184	210	216	218						
Independent	Noel Gerard Walsh	0.32%	31	33	37								
Electorate: 19,337 Valid: 9,587 Spoilt: 155 Quota: 1,199 Turnout: 9,742 (50.38%)

=== Piltown ===
Piltown: 5 seats
Party	Candidate	FPv%	Count					
Party	Candidate	FPv%	1	2	3	4	5	6
Fine Gael	Pat Dunphy	19.60%	1,579					
Labour	Tomás Breathnach	18.82%	1,516					
Fine Gael	Fidelis Doherty	13.14%	1,059	1,118	1,145	1,147	1,284	1,356
Fianna Fáil	Eamon Aylward	12.57%	1,013	1,065	1,106	1,112	1,164	1,432
Fianna Fáil	Ger Frisby	12.04%	970	984	1,010	1,017	1,143	1,246
Sinn Féin	Grace Doyle	8.38%	675	690	720	730	859	950
Fianna Fáil	Rob Duggan	7.60%	612	667	681	686	714	
Fine Gael	John Hayes	3.96%	319	345	363	365		
Independent	Melissa O'Neill	2.89%	233	241	253	291		
Independent	Alan Curran	1.01%	81	88	93			
Electorate: 16,125 Valid: 8,057 Spoilt: 130 Quota: 1,343 Turnout: 8,187 (50.77%)

== Results by gender ==
2019 Kilkenny County Council election Candidates by gender
Gender	Number of candidates	% of candidates	Elected councillors	% of councillors
Men	33	75.0%	21	87.5%
Women	11	25.0%	3	12.5%
TOTAL	44		24	

== Changes after 2019 ==
=== Co-options ===
Party	Outgoing	LEA	Reason	Date	Co-optee
Green	Malcolm Noonan	Kilkenny	Elected to the 33rd Dáil for Carlow–Kilkenny at the 2020 general election	24 February 2020	Maria Dollard

}} |Denis Hynes |Castlecomer ! style="background-color: &#35;CC0000; width: 1px;" | | Labour ! style="background-color: &#35;326760; width: 1px;" | | Sinn Féin |November 2021 |- |}

== Sources ==
- "Kilkenny County Council - Local Election candidates". RTÉ. 13 May 2019. Archived from the original on 17 September 2020.
- "2019 Election Website". Kilkenny County Council. Archived from the original on 20 June 2021.
- "Local Elections 2019: Results, Transfer of Votes and Statistics" (PDF). Department of Housing, Planning and Local Government (DHPLG). pp. 136–139. Archived from the original (PDF) on 10 June 2020.
