= 2024 Kilkenny County Council election =

Part of the 2024 Irish local elections

- 7 June 2024

All 24 seats on Kilkenny County Council 13 seats needed for a majority
	First party	Second party	Third party
Party	Fianna Fáil	Fine Gael	Labour
Last election	11	9	2
Seats before	11	8	1
Seats won	11	7	2
Seat change	Steady	▼2	Steady
Percentage	39.5%	29.7%	6.1%
	Fourth party	Fifth party	Sixth party
Party	Sinn Féin	Green	Independent
Last election	0	1	1
Seats before	1	1	2
Seats won	1	1	2
Seat change	▲1	Steady	▲1
Percentage	10.1%	2.8%	7.8%
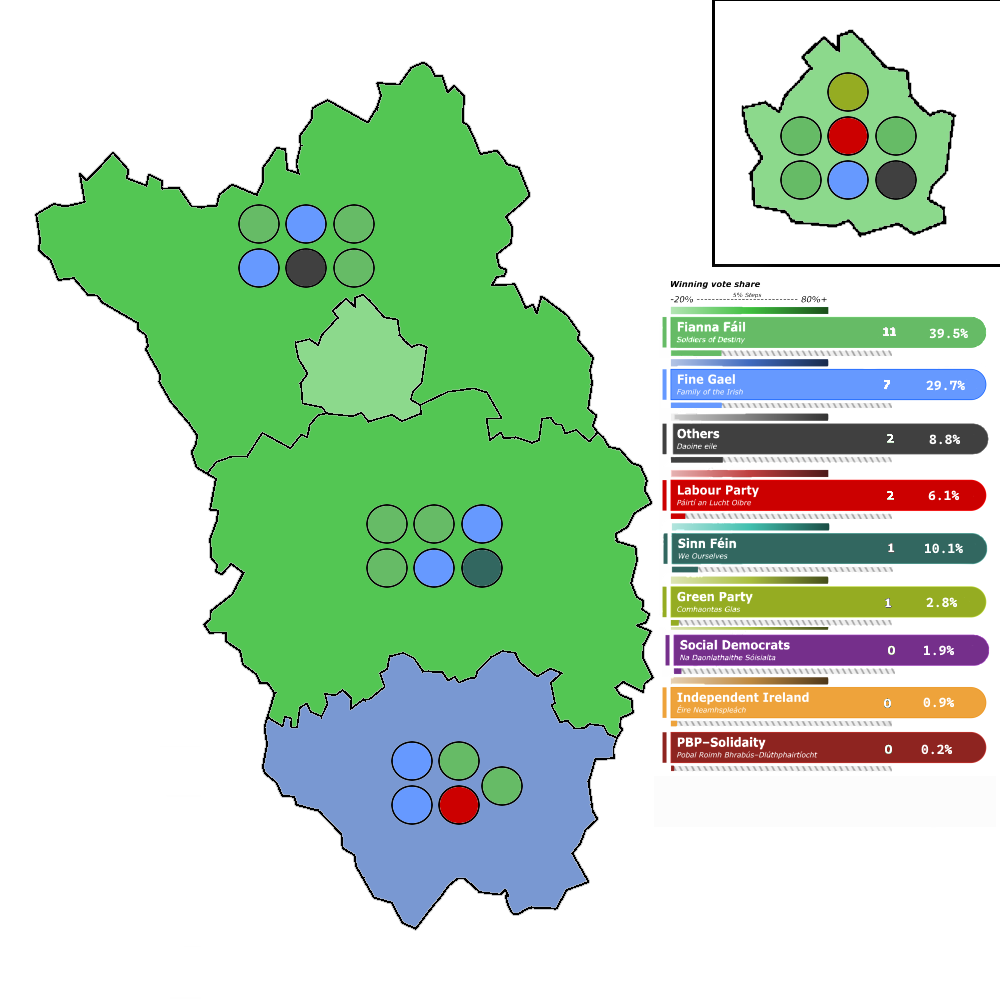
- Results by Local Electoral Area

An election to all 24 seats on Kilkenny County Council was held on 7 June 2024 as part of the 2024 Irish local elections. County Kilkenny is divided into 4 local electoral areas (LEAs) to elect councillors for a five-year term of office on the electoral system of proportional representation by means of the single transferable vote (PR-STV).

== Retiring incumbents ==
The following councillors did not seek re-election:

Constituency	Councillor	Party
Piltown	Eamon Aylward	Fianna Fáil
Callan-Thomastown	Matt Doran	Fianna Fáil
Callan-Thomastown	Patrick O’Neill	Fine Gael

== Results by party ==
*: Outgoing councillor elected in 2019.
†: Outgoing councillor coopted subsequent to the 2019 election.

Party	Candidates	Seats	±	1st pref	FPv%	±%
Fianna Fáil	12	11	Steady	15,504	39.45	▼1.66
Fine Gael	10	7	▼2	11,668	29.69	▼2.41
Labour	3	2	Steady	2,403	6.11	▼1.43
Sinn Féin	8	1	▲1	3,987	10.14	▲3.78
Green	3	1	Steady	1,105	2.81	▼1.03
Social Democrats	2	0	New	750	1.91	New
Independent Ireland	1	0	New	354	0.90	New
Irish Freedom	1	0	New	309	0.79	New
The Irish People	2	0	New	235	0.60	New
People Before Profit	1	0	Steady	89	0.23	▼0.37
Independent	7	2	▲1	2,900	7.38	▼1.08
Total	50	24	Steady	39,304	51.4%	Steady

== Results by local electoral area ==
=== Callan–Thomastown ===
Callan–Thomastown: 6 seats
Party	Candidate	FPv%	Count					
Party	Candidate	FPv%	1	2	3	4	5	6
Fianna Fáil	Peter "Chap" Cleere	19.02%	2,057					
Fianna Fáil	Joe Sheridan	18.38%	1,988					
Fine Gael	Joe Lyons	14.99%	1,621					
Fine Gael	Michael Doyle	12.41%	1,342	1,519	1,558			
Fianna Fáil	Deirdre Cullen	11.17%	1,208	1,441	1,699			
Sinn Féin	Stephanie Doheny	7.97%	862	891	935	960	1,068	1,442
Fine Gael	Orla Kelly	7.53%	814	860	921	983	1,156	1,217
Sinn Féin	David Kennedy	4.91%	531	547	569	577	600	
Green	Kristina Doyle	3.64%	394	404	422	446		
Electorate: 20,510 Valid: 10,817 Spoilt: 215 Quota: 1,546 Turnout: 11,032 (53.79%)

=== Castlecomer ===
Castlecomer: 6 seats
Party	Candidate	FPv%	Count				
Party	Candidate	FPv%	1	2	3	4	5
Fianna Fáil	Pat Fitzpatrick	21.90%	2,308				
Fine Gael	Mary Hilda Cavanagh	17.69%	1,865				
Fianna Fáil	Michael McCarthy	14.13%	1,489	1,678			
Independent	Maurice Shortall	10.94%	1,153	1,284	1,308	1,332	1,654
Fine Gael	John Brennan	10.70%	1,128	1,339	1,511		
Sinn Féin	Denis Hynes	9.68%	1,020	1,082	1,101	1,114	1,172
Fianna Fáil	Michael Delaney	9.37%	988	1,154	1,266	1,374	1,463
Independent Ireland	Daniel Burke	3.36%	354	388	404	411	
The Irish People	Stephen Delaney	2.23%	235	244	260	260	
Electorate: 19,995 Valid: 10,540 Spoilt: 138 Quota: 1,506 Turnout: 10,678 (53.40%)

=== Kilkenny ===
Kilkenny: 7 seats
Party	Candidate	FPv%	Count														
Party	Candidate	FPv%	1	2	3	4	5	6	7	8	9	10	11	12	13	14	15
Fianna Fáil	Andrew McGuinness	14.52%	1,420														
Fine Gael	David Fitzgerald	12.59%	1,231														
Independent	Eugene McGuinness	11.61%	1,136	1,170	1,170	1,189	1,192	1,199	1,208	1,235							
Fianna Fáil	Joe Malone	10.64%	1,041	1,114	1,116	1,118	1,130	1,135	1,139	1,164	1,179	1,204	1,205	1,239			
Fianna Fáil	John Coonan	7.13%	697	721	721	724	728	731	731	738	742	770	772	782	821	1,020	1,078
Labour	Seán Ó hArgáin	6.72%	657	669	669	669	671	677	678	691	700	814	816	832	881	1,015	1,106
Green	Maria Dollard	6.08%	595	601	602	604	606	616	618	632	641	683	684	690	767	832	891
Social Democrats	Martin O'Neill	5.36%	524	530	531	533	533	560	561	568	583	611	612	640	687	725	856
Fine Gael	Martin Brett	4.99%	488	504	506	506	507	508	509	531	534	559	559	569	603		
Sinn Féin	Evan Barry	3.77%	369	375	377	378	382	386	428	432	589	603	603	626	669	687	
Independent	Toluwani Akaehomen	3.30%	323	327	328	329	341	346	350	361	373	390	391	413			
Irish Freedom	Luke O’Connor	3.16%	309	311	313	327	327	333	335	342	348	349	353				
Labour	Andrea Cleere	2.99%	292	298	298	298	298	300	302	313	326						
Sinn Féin	Aoife O'Brien	1.96%	192	193	193	193	205	215	271	272							
Independent	Liam Heffernan	1.56%	153	155	156	158	159	161	163								
Sinn Féin	Mark O’Farrell	1.33%	130	132	132	135	137	138									
People Before Profit	Kevin Shore	0.91%	89	90	92	93	95										
Independent	Jony Aza	0.66%	65	66	67	67											
Independent	Michael McGrath	0.53%	52	53	54												
Independent	Noel Gerald Walsh	0.18%	18	18													
Electorate: 20,706 Valid: 9,781 Spoilt: 128 Quota: 1,223 Turnout: 9,909 (47.86%)

=== Piltown ===
Piltown: 5 seats
Party	Candidate	FPv%	Count								
Party	Candidate	FPv%	1	2	3	4	5	6	7	8	9
Fine Gael	Patrick Dunphy	21.96%	1,874								
Labour	Tomás Breathnach	17.04%	1,454								
Fianna Fáil	Ger Frisby	11.28%	963	991	999	1,019	1,023	1,048	1,150	1,193	1,351
Fine Gael	Fidelis Doherty	11.10%	947	1,055	1,074	1,095	1,101	1,119	1,253	1,278	1,381
Fianna Fáil	Jenny Slattery Catt	9.51%	812	858	868	874	880	891	920	935	1,178
Fianna Fáil	Maria Wall	6.25%	533	682	702	756	762	779	804	811	
Sinn Féin	Natasha Newsome Drennan	5.85%	499	527	540	607	611	655	686	992	1,087
Sinn Féin	Michael Wemyss	4.50%	384	391	395	413	415	440	468		
The Irish People	Richard Daly	4.31%	368	376	377	392	393				
Fine Gael	Damien Donoghue	4.19%	358	394	400	422	424	433			
Social Democrats	David Kane	2.65%	226	257	282						
Green	Benny McDonagh	1.36%	116	126							
Electorate: 17,132 Valid: 8,534 Spoilt: 96 Quota: 1,423 Turnout: 8,630 (50.37%)
