= 2004 Kilkenny County Council election =

Part of the 2004 Irish local elections

- 11 June 2004

All 26 seats on Kilkenny County Council
	First party	Second party	Third party
Party	Fine Gael	Fianna Fáil	Labour
Seats won	11	8	5
Seat change	0	-4	+4
	Fourth party	Fifth party
Party	Green	Independent
Seats won	1	1
Seat change	+1	-1
- Map showing the area of Kilkenny County Council
Council control before election
Fianna Fáil
Independents
Council control after election
Fine Gael
Labour Party

An election to Kilkenny County Council took place on 11 June 2004 as part of that year's Irish local elections. 26 councillors were elected from five local electoral areas (LEAs) for a five-year term of office on the electoral system of proportional representation by means of the single transferable vote (PR-STV).

== Results by party ==
Party	Seats	±	First Pref. votes	FPv%	±%
Fine Gael	11	0	15,029	37.64	
Fianna Fáil	8	-4	13,690	34.28	
Labour	5	+4	5,950	14.90	
Green	1	+1	1,858	4.65	
Independent	1	-1	1,609	4.03	
Totals	26	0	39,933	100.00	—

== Results by local electoral area ==
=== Ballyragget ===
Ballyragget - 5 seats
Party	Candidate	FPv%	Count					
Party	Candidate	FPv%	1	2	3	4	5	6
Labour	Maurice Shortall	22.57	1,789					
Fine Gael	Mary Hilda Cavanagh*	18.29	1,450					
Fine Gael	Catherine Connery*	18.20	1,205	753	873	917	953	957
Fianna Fáil	Pat Millea*	14.04	1,113	812	945	1,359		
Fine Gael	Dan Brennan*	12.14	962	859	876	908	957	962
Fianna Fáil	Martin Carroll*	9.97	790	756	965	1,087		
Fianna Fáil	Seán Doherty	7.80	618	664				
Electorate: 12,093 Valid: 7,927 (65.55%) Spoilt: 162 Quota: 1,322 Turnout: 8,089 (66.89%)

=== Callan ===
Callan - 3 seats
Party	Candidate	FPv%	Count
Party	Candidate	FPv%	1
Fianna Fáil	Matt Doran	29.12	1,468
Fine Gael	Tom Maher*	28.80	1,452
Fine Gael	Billy Ireland*	26.04	1,313
Fianna Fáil	Eamon Walsh	16.05	809
Electorate: 8,464 Valid: 5,042 (59.57%) Spoilt: 177 Quota: 1,261 Turnout: 5,219 (61.66%)

=== Kilkenny ===
Kilkenny - 7 seats
Party	Candidate	FPv%	Count													
Party	Candidate	FPv%	1	2	3	4	5	6	7	8	9	10	11	12	13	14
Fianna Fáil	John Coonan*	11.07	1,207	1,219	1,242	1,262	1,281	1,332	1,370							
Fianna Fáil	Pat Fitzpatrick*	9.93	1,083	1,088	1,106	1,144	1,132	1,160	1,196	1,317	1,356	1,357	1,358	1,422		
Green	Malcolm Noonan	9.85	1,074	1,099	1,142	1,183	1,287	1,372								
Fine Gael	Martin Brett*	7.12	776	787	802	857	866	901	929	1,005	1,116	1,167	1,168	1,354	1,374	
Labour	Joe Cody*	7.08	772	842	877	904	946	995	1,205	1,275	1,330	1,333	1,336	1,426		
Progressive Democrats	Coleman Loughnane	6.56	715	721	757	790	805	839	868	933	977	979	979	1,031	1,043	1,046
Fianna Fáil	Michael Lanigan, Jnr*	6.27	684	701	719	733	764	786	813	921	962	963	964	1,029	1,044	1,061
Fine Gael	Pat Crotty	5.94	648	655	665	693	699	725	753	778	901	901	901			
Fine Gael	Paul Cuddihy*	5.80	632	650	666	717	724	745	777	795	982	983	984	1,277	1,293	1,310
Fine Gael	Paddy Hogan	5.34	582	586	607	660	676	692	719	751						
Fianna Fáil	John Eardly	4.78	521	527	538	546	565	593	605							
Sinn Féin	Tom Kiernan	3.76	410	413	426	432										
Independent	Teresa Mullen*	3.67	400	410	442	473	507									
Labour	Marie Fitzpatrick	3.61	394	448	465	479	508	553								
Fine Gael	Breda Raggett	3.54	386	407	416											
Independent	Jimmy Leahy	3.08	336	343												
Labour	Tony Patterson	2.60	283													
Electorate: 19,198 Valid: 10,903 (56.79%) Spoilt: 134 Quota: 1,363 Turnout: 11,086 (57.75%)

=== Piltown ===
Piltown - 6 seats
Party	Candidate	FPv%	Count								
Party	Candidate	FPv%	1	2	3	4	5	6	7	8	9
Fianna Fáil	Bobby Aylward*	16.66	1,478								
Fine Gael	Pat Dunphy*	12.89	1,144	1,155	1,169	1,175	1,183	1,271			
Labour	Tomás Breathnach	12.47	1,107	1,122	1,203	1,206	1,237	1,284			
Fine Gael	Dick Dowling*	11.72	1,040	1,058	1,083	1,097	1,186	1,218	1,223	1,224	1,332
Fine Gael	Catherine Phelan-Holden	8.07	716	744	763	874	906	956	959	960	1,040
Fine Gael	John O'Dwyer	7.72	685	693	721	758	800	806	807	807	858
Sinn Féin	Kevin Dunphy	7.57	672	680	719	731	751	800	804	804	
Fianna Fáil	Cora Long*	5.95	528	562	567	615	702	990	993	994	1,156
Fianna Fáil	Ann Blackmore*	5.34	474	520	533	585	661				
Fianna Fáil	Margaret Haberlin	4.45	395	407	429	461					
Fianna Fáil	Pat Walsh	3.81	338	363	371						
Green	John Fitzgerald	3.35	297	302							
Electorate: 14,187 Valid: 8,874 (62.55%) Spoilt: 112 Quota: 1,268 Turnout: 9,099 (64.14%)

=== Thomastown ===
Thomastown - 5 seats
Party	Candidate	FPv%	Count						
Party	Candidate	FPv%	1	2	3	4	5	6	7
Fine Gael	Pat O'Neill	15.12	1,145	1,195	1,343				
Labour	Michael O'Brien	12.73	964	1,071	1,091	1,094	1,125	1,202	1,222
Fianna Fáil	Tom Brennan*	11.98	907	944	991	997	1,155	1,504	
Independent	Dixie Doyle*	11.53	873	913	931	934	981	1,140	1,214
Fine Gael	Andy Cotterell*	8.85	670	715	855	906	934	1,063	1,106
Fianna Fáil	Seán Treacy	8.79	666	693	711	714	870		
Labour	Ann Phelan	8.46	641	718	857	867	1,061	1,115	1,138
Fianna Fáil	Joan Murphy*	8.07	611	636	698	702			
Fine Gael	John Meaney	8.04	609	633					
Green	Judith Ashton	6.43	487						
Electorate: 12,083 Valid: 7,573 (62.67%) Spoilt: 162 Quota: 1,263 Turnout: 7,735 (64.02%)
