= 2014 Kilkenny County Council election =

Part of the 2014 Irish local elections

- 23 May 2014

All 24 seats to Kilkenny County Council 13 seats needed for a majority
	First party	Second party	Third party
Party	Fianna Fáil	Fine Gael	Sinn Féin
Seats won	10	7	3
Seat change	▲3	▼5	▲3
Percentage	37.2%	29.9%	9.9%
	Fourth party	Fifth party	Sixth party
Party	Labour	Green	Independent
Seats won	2	1	1
Seat change	▼3	Steady	Steady
Percentage	11.2%	3.5%	7.2%
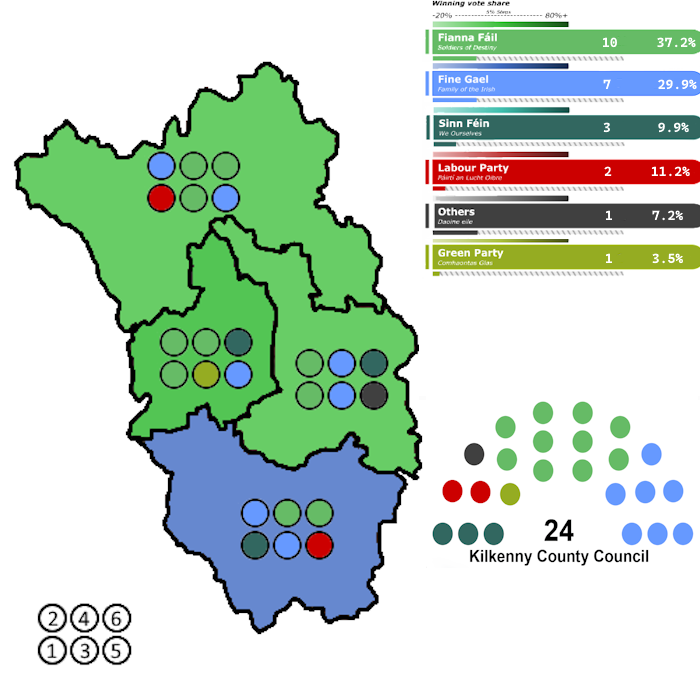
- Election results by Local Electoral Area
Council control before election
Fine Gael
Labour Party
Council control after election
Fine Gael
Labour Party
Green Party
Independents

An election to all 24 seats on Kilkenny County Council took place on 23 May 2014 as part of the 2014 Irish local elections, a reduction from 26 seats at the 2009 election. County Kilkenny was divided into 3 local electoral areas to elect councillors for a five-year term of office on the electoral system of proportional representation by means of the single transferable vote (PR-STV). In addition, Kilkenny Borough Council was abolished.

Fianna Fáil became the largest party securing 10 seats, a gain of 3. Fine Gael, by contrast, had a very poor set of results and lost 5 of their seats returning with 7 seats in all. Sinn Féin broke through in the county winning 3 seats, while Labour retained just 2 seats on the council. Malcolm Noonan of the Greens was re-elected in Kilkenny city and Independents secured the final seat.

== Results by party ==
Party	Seats	±	1st pref	FPv%	±%
Fianna Fáil	10	+3	14,550	37.2	
Fine Gael	7	-5	11,705	29.9	
Sinn Féin	3	+3	3,853	9.9	
Labour	2	-3	4,362	11.2	
Green	1	0	1,372	3.5	
Independent	1	0	2,827	7.2	
Total	24	-2	38,669	100.0	—

== Results by local electoral area ==
*: Outgoing councillor.

=== Castlecomer ===
Castlecomer: 6 seats
Party	Candidate	FPv%	Count								
Party	Candidate	FPv%	1	2	3	4	5	6	7	8	9
Labour	Maurice Shorthall	16.10	1,665								
Fine Gael	Mary Hilda Cavanagh	13.93	1,440	1,446	1,451	1,501					
Fianna Fáil	Pat Fitzpatrick	11.02	1,139	1,167	1,176	1,230	1,312	1,350	1,663		
Fianna Fáil	Pat Millea	11.02	1,139	1,147	1,150	1,168	1,189	1,266	1,405	1,463	1,464
Fianna Fáil	Michael McCarthy	10.18	1,053	1,057	1,059	1,069	1,080	1,129	1,197	1,300	1,301
Sinn Féin	Catríona Redmond	9.16	947	974	1,002	1,023	1,151	1,168	1,274	1,291	1,291
Fianna Fáil	Maria Fenlon-Keating	6.85	708	712	726	826	859	887			
Fine Gael	John Brennan	6.28	649	708	724	849	947	1,242	1,316	1,323	1,344
Fine Gael	Joan Fitzpatrick	4.88	505	510	512	595	618	618			
Fine Gael	Thomas Byrne	4.85	501	503	504						
Independent	Gerrard Ferris	3.98	412	447	525	531					
Independent	Jamie Dowling	1.75	181	190							
Electorate: 17,610 Valid: 10,339 (58.71%) Spoilt: 137 Quota: 1,478 Turnout: 10,476 (59.49%)

=== Kilkenny City-East ===
Kilkenny City-East: 6 seats
Party	Candidate	FPv%	Count											
Party	Candidate	FPv%	1	2	3	4	5	6	7	8	9	10	11	12
Fianna Fáil	Andrew McGuinness	14.63	1,373											
Fianna Fáil	Peter "Chap" Cleere	10.46	981	986	989	994	1,013	1,086	1,119	1,171	1,190	1,498		
Fine Gael	Patrick O'Neill	9.99	938	939	948	953	974	1,009	1,041	1,071	1,114	1,173	1,191	1,241
Fine Gael	Michael Doyle	9.37	879	879	883	885	902	910	923	970	999	1,125	1,173	1,419
Sinn Féin	David Kennedy	7.81	733	735	740	780	795	804	830	885	929	976	994	1,056
Labour	Tommy Prendergast	7.02	659	659	660	663	729	730	806	820	856	879	893	
Fine Gael	Jimmy Leahy	6.85	643	646	653	676	687	756	814	820	876	892	896	941
Fianna Fáil	Seán Treacy	5.86	550	552	554	558	594	673	692	783	794			
Independent	Breda Gardner	5.32	499	499	529	574	616	633	670	774	898	962	989	1,060
Independent	Dixie Doyle	4.34	407	408	415	424	465	467	476					
Green	Rian Coulter	4.1	385	386	404	418	423	436	479	487				
Labour	Marie Fitzpatrick	3.64	342	345	351	367	403	425						
Fianna Fáil	Joe Reidy	3.56	334	344	347	356	361	361						
Labour	Michael O'Brien	3.50	328	329	333	335								
Independent	Daithí Holohan	2.05	192	194	218	218								
Independent	Ramie Leahy	0.76	71	71										
Independent	Remi Sikora	0.43	40	40										
Independent	Adam Zagorski	0.32	30	30										
Electorate: 16,618 Valid: 9,383 (56.46%) Spoilt: 119 Quota: 1,341 Turnout: 9,502 (57.18%)

=== Kilkenny City-West ===
Kilkenny City-West: 6 seats
Party	Candidate	FPv%	Count									
Party	Candidate	FPv%	1	2	3	4	5	6	7	8	9	10
Fianna Fáil	Matt Doran	13.58	1,319	1,320	1,321	1,382	1,402					
Fianna Fáil	Joe Malone	11.80	1,146	1,153	1,172	1,173	1,197	1,232	1,290	1,534		
Green	Malcolm Noonan	10.16	987	1,012	1,072	1,080	1,189	1,313	1,347	1,415		
Fianna Fáil	Patrick McKee†	10.13	984	994	1,004	1,009	1,043	1,073	1,123	1,330	1,436	
Sinn Féin	Kathleen Funchion††	9.80	952	965	981	992	1,014	1,146	1,188	1,260	1,271	1,283
Fine Gael	David Fitzgerald	9.12	886	894	910	960	1,010	1,029	1,200	1,279	1,284	1,293
Fianna Fáil	John Coonan	7.58	736	742	744	751	777	794	866			
Fine Gael	Martin Brett	7.19	698	706	721	752	810	831	1,052	1,181	1,205	1,223
Fine Gael	Billy Ireland	6.52	633	634	636	687	705	714				
Anti-Austerity Alliance	Conor MacLiam	4.20	408	422	448	450	470					
Labour	Seán O hArgáin	4.05	393	404	412	415						
Fine Gael	Paul Croke	2.60	252	254	255							
Independent	Conor Foley	1.82	177	195								
Independent	Wladek Hanczar	1.43	139									
Electorate: 17,274 Valid: 9,710 (56.21%) Spoilt: 98 Quota: 1,388 Turnout: 9,808 (56.78%)

=== Piltown ===
Piltown: 6 seats
Party	Candidate	FPv%	Count									
Party	Candidate	FPv%	1	2	3	4	5	6	7	8	9	10
Fine Gael	Pat Dunphy	12.81	1,222	1,279	1,306	1,310	1,392					
Sinn Féin	Melissa O'Neill†††	12.80	1,221	1,265	1,301	1,346	1,469					
Labour	Tomás Breathnach	10.22	975	1,034	1,051	1,066	1,132	1,149	1,183	1,197	1,320	1,349
Fianna Fáil	Eamon Aylward	9.65	921	938	1,045	1,160	1,197	1,205	1,256	1,286	1,547	
Fine Gael	Fidelis Doherty	9.28	885	969	979	1,048	1,053	1,058	1,474			
Fianna Fáil	Ger Frisby	7.34	700	745	773	840	855	860	891	902	1,041	1,164
Fine Gael	John Maher	6.41	612	618	666	675	765	771	807	857	969	986
Fianna Fáil	Cora Long	6.07	579	598	664	710	785	795	812	817		
Independent	John Burke	6.04	576	585	611	618						
Fine Gael	Paddy Gaule	5.83	556	572	583	676	681	681	681			
Fianna Fáil	Pat Walsh	4.92	469	480	506							
Fianna Fáil	Brendan Fennelly	4.39	419	421								
Fine Gael	Fintan Byrne	4.26	406									
Electorate: 17,578 Valid: 9,541 (54.28%) Spoilt: 117 Quota: 1,364 Turnout: 9,658 (54.94%)

== Changes ==
=== Co-options ===
Party	Outgoing	LEA	Reason	Date	Co-optee
Sinn Féin	Kathleen Funchion	Kilkenny City-West	Elected to the 32nd Dáil at the 2016 general election.	25 April 2016	Sean Tyrrell

=== Changes in affiliation ===
Name	LEA	Elected as	New affiliation	Date
Patrick McKee	Kilkenny City-West	Fianna Fáil	Renua	30 March 2015
Patrick McKee	Kilkenny City-West	Renua	Fianna Fáil	5 December 2016
Melissa O'Neill	Piltown	Sinn Féin	Independent	7 December 2016

== Sources ==
"Irish Independent". Archived from the original on 29 May 2014.
