= County Hall, Kilkenny =

Municipal building in County Kilkenny, Ireland

- Halla an Chontae, Cill Chainnigh
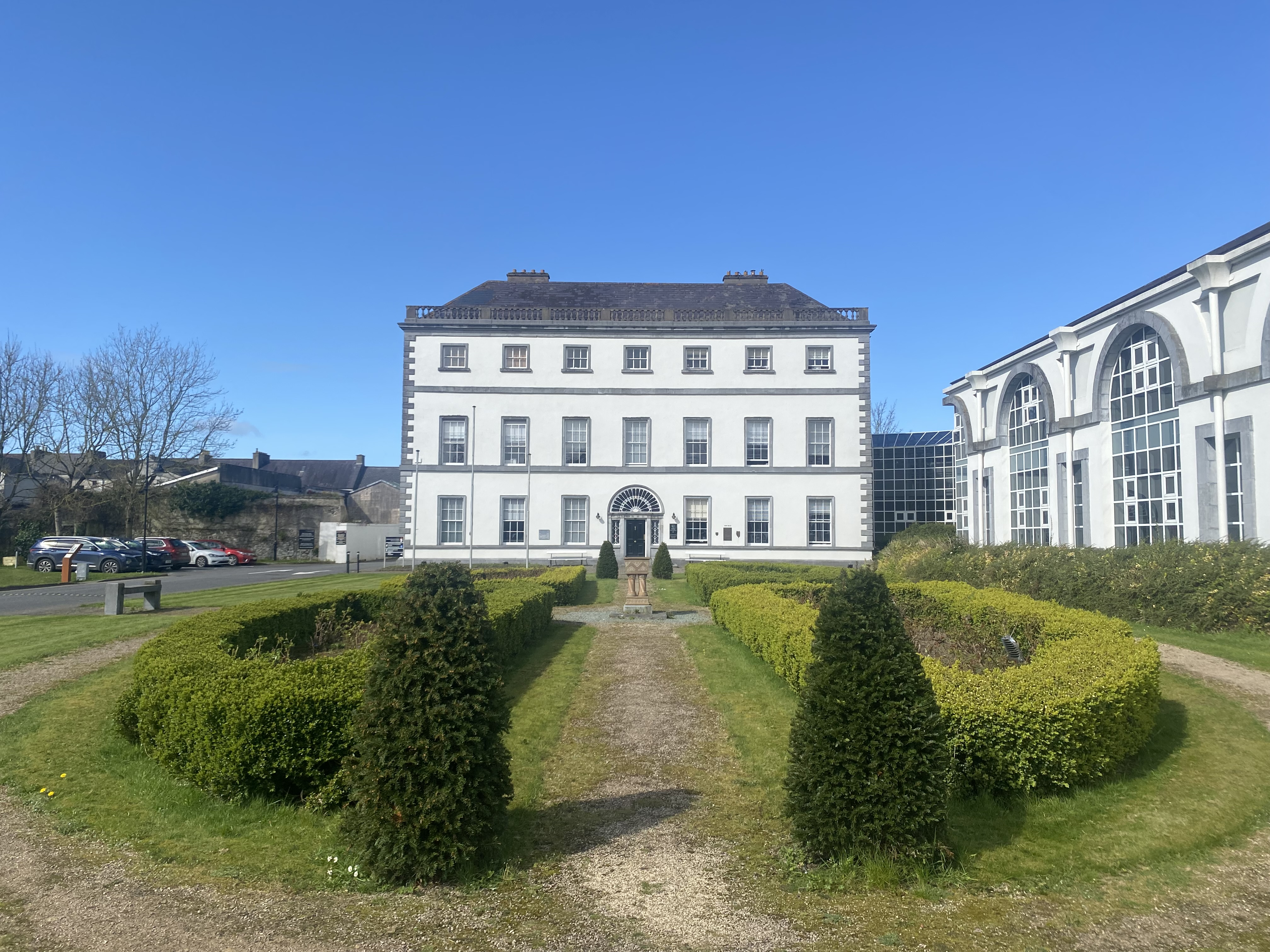
- County Hall, Kilkenny, 2024

- Location within Ireland

General information
- Architectural style: Neoclassical style
- Location: Kilkenny, County Kilkenny, Ireland
- Coordinates: 52.6525°N 7.2479°W
- Completed: 1785

Design and construction
- Architect: Charles Vierpyl

County Hall (Irish: Halla an Chontae, Cill Chainnigh) is a municipal facility in Kilkenny, County Kilkenny, Ireland.

== History ==
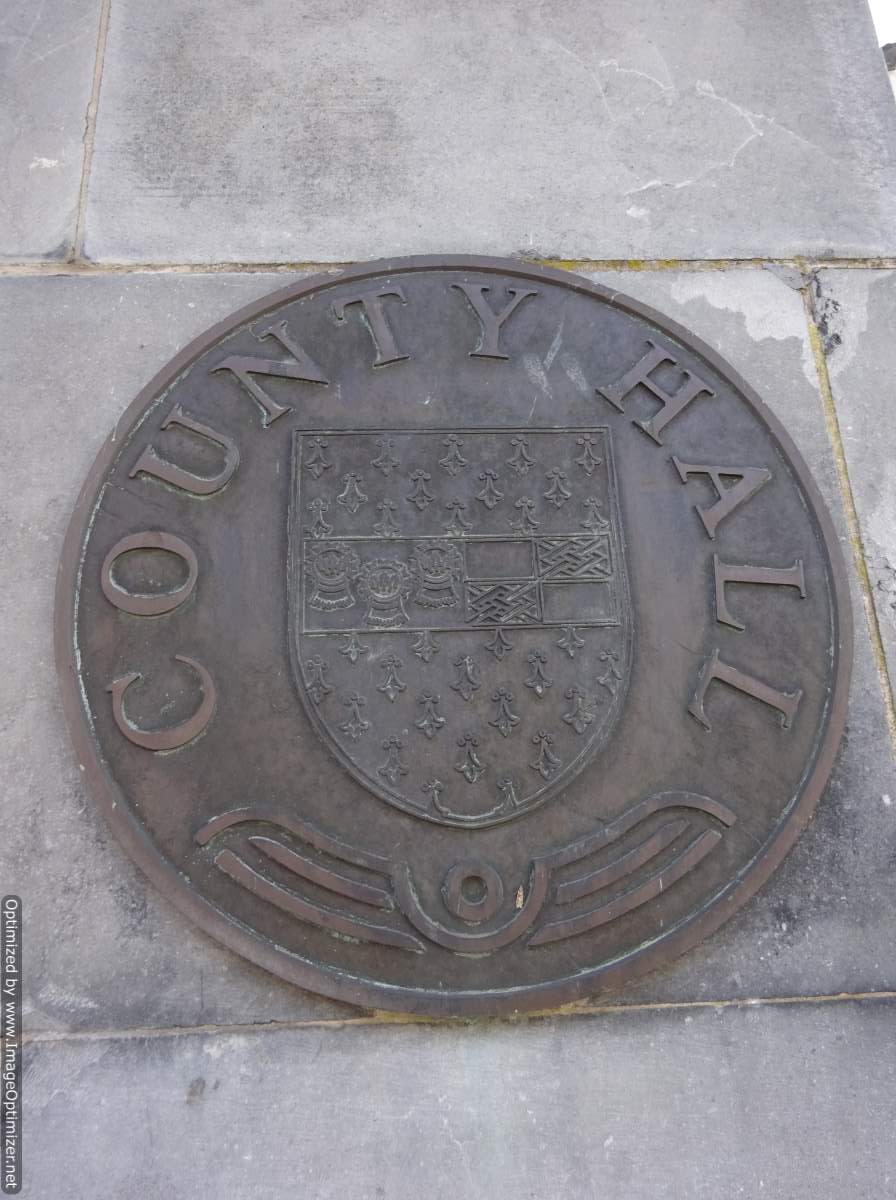
Brass plaque with the Kilkenny county arms

The original building on the site was commissioned by James Butler, 1st Duke of Ormond as the new home for Kilkenny Grammar School and was completed in 1667. The current building, which was designed by Charles Vierpyl in the Neoclassical style to replace the original facility, was completed in 1785. A serious fire in 1980 left the roof of the building badly damaged; pupils and teachers had to move out while major repairs were carried out. It remained the home of what became Kilkenny College until the school moved to modern facilities at McAdoo Hall on the Celbridge House site in 1985. Kilkenny County Council, which had previously been accommodated in offices at John's Green House, moved into the building in 1994.
