= Kilkenny Courthouse =

- Teach Cúirt Chill Chainnigh
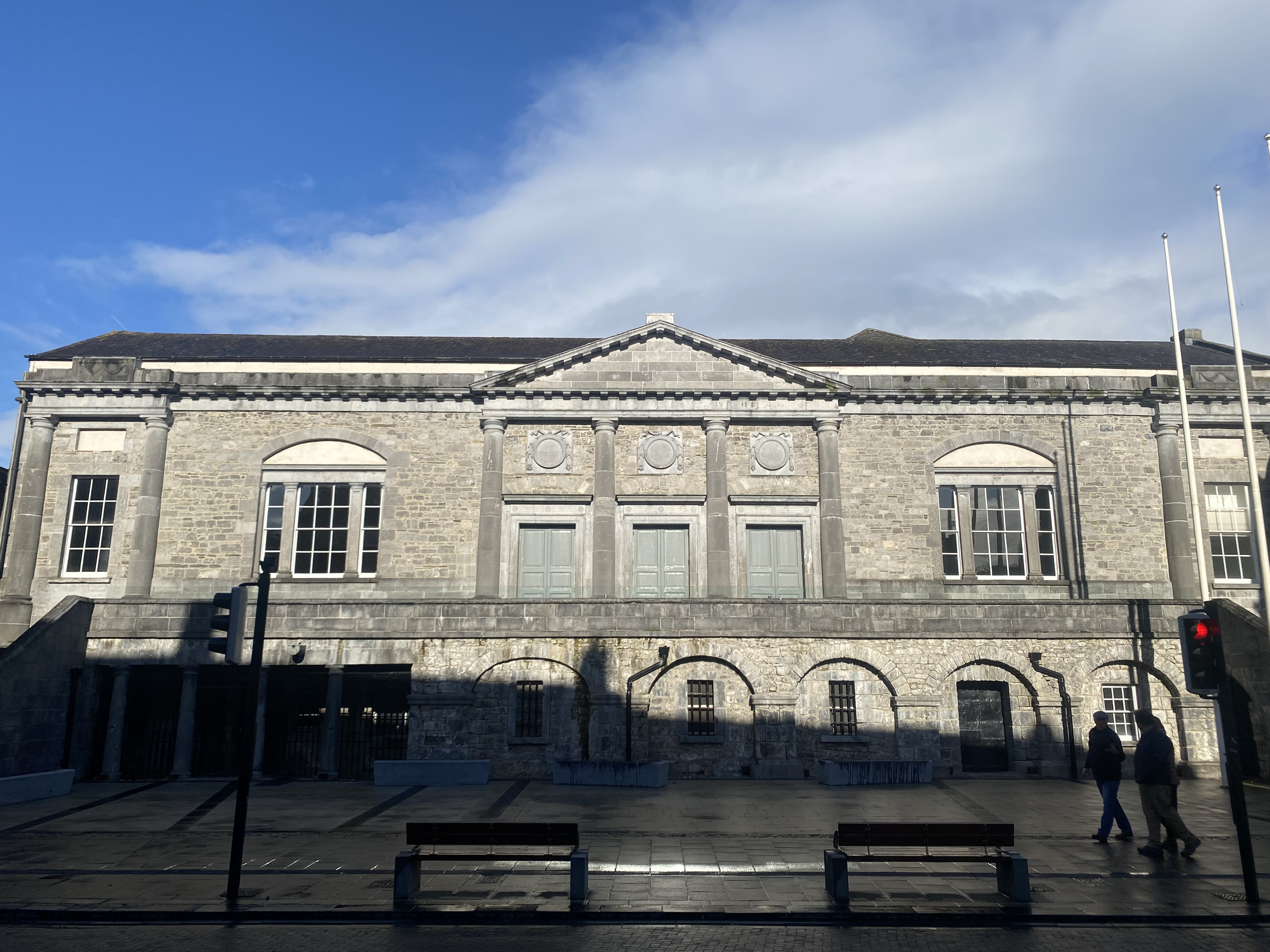
- Kilkenny Courthouse in 2024

- Location within Ireland

General information
- Architectural style: Neoclassical style
- Location: Kilkenny, County Kilkenny, Ireland
- Coordinates: 52.6542°N 7.254°W
- Completed: 1792

Design and construction
- Architect: Sir Jerome Fitzpatrick

Kilkenny Courthouse, also known as Grace's Castle, is a judicial facility in Parliament Street, Kilkenny, County Kilkenny, Ireland.

== History ==
The site was previously occupied by Grace's Castle, a structure dating back to the 13th century. It was used as a prison from 1566 and some of the features of these aspects of the earlier building still survive at basement level. The current building, which was designed by Sir Jerome Fitzpatrick in the neoclassical style and built in ashlar stone, was completed in 1792. The design involved a symmetrical main frontage facing Parliament Street; it was arcaded on the ground floor with flights of steps leading up to the end bays; the central section featured a tetrastyle portico on the first floor with Doric order columns supporting an entablature and a modillioned pediment.

The building was originally designed as a judicial facility, but following the implementation of the Local Government (Dublin) Act 1993, it also became the meeting place of Kilkenny County Council. By the second half of the 20th century the county council had moved to new offices at John's Green House.
