= Daithí Holohan =

Irish artist from Kilkenny (born 1956)

- Daithí O hUallacháin
- Born: 1956 (age 69–70); Kilkenny
- Style: Portraiture
- Movement: Naturalism

Daithí Holohan (born 1956) is an Irish artist from Kilkenny. Specialising in portraiture, he also does landscape and still life.

Holohan studied Fine Art Painting at the National College of Art and Design (NCAD) and graduated from the University of Minnesota in 1978. Campbell Bruce, former NCAD Professor of Painting, said of his work: "Firstly the psychological interaction between artist and sitter is revealed. They are almost entirely people known to him before he decides to do a drawing, usually quite small, always observed with great precision. The intensity of the drawing process is immediately apparent and to be subjected to such scrutiny must t times be most uncomfortable for the sitter, for who knows what may be revealed." He added: "They have become technically more accomplished, more human in understanding and they now have a density that is rare in contemporary portraiture."

In 1988, Aidan Dunne (writing in the Sunday Tribune) described him as an 'instinctive naturalist with a good eye . ... sincerely an artist of promise'.

Holohan's first major retrospective occurred in 2004.

He stood as a candidate in the 2014 Kilkenny County Council election and the 2015 Carlow–Kilkenny by-election. During the latter campaign he made a notorious appearance on Tonight with Vincent Browne, where he was repeatedly chastised by the moderator for interrupting other candidates. Experiences of life in psychiatric hospitals feature in his work.
