= Pat O'Neill (Kilkenny politician) =

Irish politician (born 1958)

Senator
- In office 25 May 2011 – 8 June 2016
- Constituency: Agricultural Panel

Personal details
- Born: 14 November 1958 (age 67) County Kilkenny, Ireland
- Party: Fine Gael

Pat O'Neill (born 14 November 1958) is an Irish Fine Gael politician and former senator.

He was elected for a term to Seanad Éireann on the Agricultural Panel in April 2011. He was a member of Kilkenny County Council from 2004 to 2011 representing the Thomastown local electoral area. He was the Fine Gael Seanad spokesperson on Transport.
