= Ramie Leahy =

Irish artist

'Ramie Leahy is an Irish artist known for his use of color and as a co-founder of the Kilkenny Arts Festival.

Leahy attended primary school in Kilkenny and later studied painting and sculpture at various art institutions in Ireland. He received a scholarship to study visual arts in Florence, Italy where he created a series of political works about the Troubles in Northern Ireland.

In 1974, Leahy co-founded the Kilkenny Arts Festival, one of Ireland's first international arts festivals. He was part of the Independent Artists Group in Ireland during this period.

In 1977, Leahy acquired the Dysart Castle, the childhood home of philosopher George Berkeley. He has lectured on Berkeley's history with the International Berkeley Society.

== Founding Kilkenny Arts Festival ==
In 1974 Leahy co-founded Ireland's first, and still most highly regarded, international arts festival, Kilkenny Arts Festival.

During this period, he was also involved with the Independent Artists Group a group of leading Irish artists including Cliona Cussen, Brid Ni Rinn, George and Justin Laffin, and worked as forward planner for Wexford Opera Festival.

== George Berkeley, Philosophy and Dysart Castle ==
In 1977 Leahy acquired Dysart Castle and farm, the childhood home of Ireland's most famous philosopher George Berkeley, after whom the University of California is named. Leahy became an expert in Berkeley's early history and has lectured with the International Berkeley society in Rhode Island, where Berkeley lived in America. In 2008 he held a music concert at Dysart Castle with acts including John Martyn and Katherine Jenkins.

== Artistic career ==
Leahy has specialized in the use of high intensity colour in all his artistic forms from landscapes to political satire and natural history studies. He has variously been described as impressionist to surrealist in his extreme use of his mediums, primarily oil paints and watercolours. Through the 1980s he worked on a series of paintings exploring ancient cultures from Brittany through England to Ireland and Jersey.

=== Colourist movement in Kilkenny 1996 ===
In 1996 Leahy and a group of high-profile artists with links to his hometown of Kilkenny founded the Kilkenny Colourists Movement.

Others in the group included Tony O’Malley and his wife Jane O’Malley, Francis Tansey, and other Irish impressionist artists whose work involved a particular focus on the use of colours. The group continued to exhibit together, usually during Kilkenny Arts Festival, during the late 1990s. Other members include Paula Minchin, Elizabeth Cope and Mick Mulcahy.
