= Kilkenny County Council =

Local authority of County Kilkenny in Ireland

Kilkenny County Council Comhairle Chontae Chill Chainnigh

Type
- Type: County council of County Kilkenny

History
- Founded: 1 April 1899

Leadership
- Cathaoirleach: Joe Malone, FF

Structure
- Seats: 24
- Political groups: Fianna Fáil (11) Fine Gael (7) Labour (2) Green (1) Sinn Féin (1) Independent (2)

Elections
- Last election: 7 June 2024

Meeting place
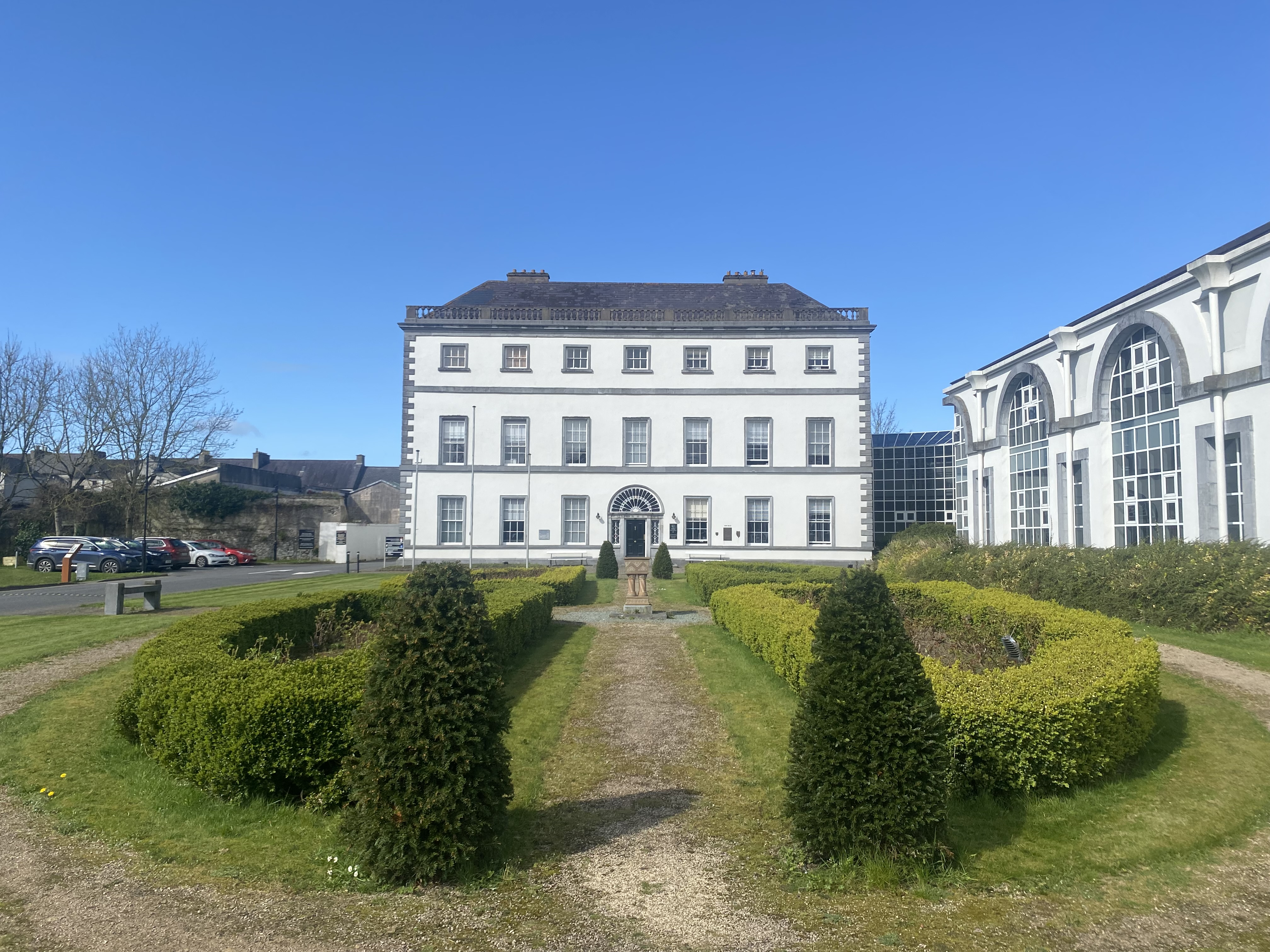
- County Hall, Kilkenny

Website
- Official website

The area governed by the council

Kilkenny County Council (Irish: Comhairle Chontae Chill Chainnigh) is the local authority of County Kilkenny, Ireland. As a county council, it is governed by the Local Government Act 2001. The council is responsible for housing and community, roads and transportation, urban planning and development, amenity and culture, and environment. The council has 24 elected members. Elections are held every five years and are by single transferable vote. The head of the council has the title of Cathaoirleach (chairperson). The county administration is headed by a chief executive, Lar Power. The county town is Kilkenny city.

== History ==
Kilkenny County Council was established on 1 April 1899 under the Local Government (Ireland) Act 1898 for the administrative county of County Kilkenny. This area was that of the judicial county of Kilkenny, except the portion of the town of New Ross, which was transferred to County Wexford; the judicial county of the city of Kilkenny; and the district electoral division of Kilculliheen in the judicial county of Waterford.

The county council originally met at Kilkenny Courthouse. By the second half of the 20th century it had moved to new offices at John's Green House. The county council moved to its current home, County Hall, in 1994.

In 2000, as part of a government initiative called "Better Local Government – A Programme for Change", a new structure was introduced to Kilkenny County Council which included five Strategic Policy Committees.

== Regional Assembly ==
Kilkenny County Council has two representatives on the Southern Regional Assembly who are part of the South-East Strategic Planning Area Committee.

== Elections ==
The Local Government (Ireland) Act 1919 introduced the electoral system of proportional representation by means of the single transferable vote (PR-STV) for the 1920 Irish local elections. This electoral system has been retained, with the 24 members of Kilkenny County Council elected for a five-year term of office from multi-member local electoral areas (LEAs).

| Year | FF | FG | Lab | GP | SF | WP | Ind. | Total |
| 2024 | 11 | 7 | 2 | 1 | 1 | 0 | 2 | 24 |
| 2019 | 11 | 9 | 2 | 1 | 0 | 0 | 1 | 24 |
| 2014 | 10 | 7 | 2 | 1 | 3 | 0 | 1 | 24 |
| 2009 | 7 | 12 | 5 | 1 | 0 | 0 | 1 | 26 |
| 2004 | 8 | 11 | 5 | 1 | 0 | 0 | 1 | 26 |
| 1999 | 12 | 11 | 1 | 0 | 0 | 0 | 2 | 26 |
| 1991 | 12 | 10 | 4 | 0 | 0 | 0 | 0 | 26 |
| 1985 | 11 | 10 | 3 | 0 | 0 | 1 | 1 | 26 |

== Local electoral areas and municipal districts ==
County Kilkenny is divided into municipal districts and LEAs, defined by electoral divisions.

| Municipal District and LEA | Definition | Seats |
|---|---|---|
| Callan–Thomastown | Aghaviller, Ballyhale, Ballyvool, Bennettsbridge, Boolyglass, Bramblestown, Brownsford, Burnchurch, Callan Rural, Callan Urban, Castlebanny, Coolaghmore, Coolhill, Danesfort, Dunbell, Dunnamaggan, Dysartmoon, Earlstown, Ennisnag, Famma, Freaghana, Graiguenamanagh, Grange, Inistioge, Jerpoint Church, Kells, Kilfane, Killamery, Kilmaganny, Kiltorcan, Knocktopher, Mallardstown, Outrath, Pleberstown, Powerstown, Rosbercon Rural, Scotsborough, Stonyford, The Rower, Thomastown, Tullaghanbrogue, Tullaherin, Tullahought, Ullard and Woolengrange. | 6 |
| Castlecomer | Attanagh, Balleen, Ballinamara, Ballybeagh, Ballycallan, Ballyconra, Ballyragget, Baunmore, Castlecomer, Clara, Clogh, Clogharinka, Clomantagh, Coolcraheen, Freshford, Galmoy, Glashare, Goresbridge, Gowran, Johnstown, Kilkieran, Kilmacar, Kilmanagh, Lisdowney, Moneenroe, Mothell, Muckalee (in the former Rural District of Castlecomer), Odagh, Paulstown, Rathbeagh, Rathcoole, Rathealy, Shankill, Tiscoffin, Tubbridbrittain, Tullaroan and Urlingford. | 6 |
| Kilkenny City | Dunmore, Kilkenny No. 1 Urban, Kilkenny No. 2 Urban, Kilkenny Rural and St. Canice. | 7 |
| Piltown | Aglish, Ballincrea, Castlegannon, Dunkitt, Farnoge, Fiddown, Jerpoint West, Kilbeacon, Kilbride, Kilcolumb, Kilculliheen (part), Kilkeasy, Killahy, Kilmakevoge, Listerlin, Muckalee (in the former Rural District of Carrick-on-Suir No. 3), Pilltown, Pollrone, Portnascully, Rathpatrick, Rossinan, Shanbogh, Templeorum, Tubbrid, Ullid and Whitechurch. | 5 |

== Councillors ==
The following were elected at the 2024 Kilkenny County Council election.

=== 2024 seats summary ===
| Party | Seats |
|---|---|
| Fianna Fáil | 11 |
| Fine Gael | 7 |
| Labour | 2 |
| Green | 1 |
| Sinn Féin | 1 |
| Independent | 2 |

=== Councillors by electoral area ===
This list reflects the order in which councillors were elected on 7 June 2024.

Council members from 2024 election
| Local electoral area | Name | Party |
|---|---|---|
| Callan–Thomastown | Peter "Chap" Cleere (Note: Replaced during term, see table below for details.) | Fianna Fáil |
| Callan–Thomastown | Joe Sheridan | Fianna Fáil |
| Callan–Thomastown | Joe Lyons | Fine Gael |
| Callan–Thomastown | Michael Doyle | Fine Gael |
| Callan–Thomastown | Deirdre Cullen | Fianna Fáil |
| Callan–Thomastown | Stephanie Doheny | Sinn Féin |
| Castlecomer | Pat Fitzpatrick | Fianna Fáil |
| Castlecomer | Mary Hilda Cavanagh | Fine Gael |
| Castlecomer | Michael McCarthy | Fianna Fáil |
| Castlecomer | John Brennan | Fine Gael |
| Castlecomer | Maurice Shortall | Independent |
| Castlecomer | Michael Delaney | Fianna Fáil |
| Kilkenny | Andrew McGuinness | Fianna Fáil |
| Kilkenny | David Fitzgerald | Fine Gael |
| Kilkenny | Eugene McGuinness | Independent |
| Kilkenny | Joe Malone | Fianna Fáil |
| Kilkenny | John Coonan | Fianna Fáil |
| Kilkenny | Seán Ó hArgáin | Labour |
| Kilkenny | Maria Dollard | Green |
| Piltown | Patrick Dunphy | Fine Gael |
| Piltown | Tomás Breathnach | Labour |
| Piltown | Ger Frisby | Fianna Fáil |
| Piltown | Fidelis Doherty | Fine Gael |
| Piltown | Jenny Catt Slattery | Fianna Fáil |

==== Co-options ====
| Party | Outgoing | LEA | Reason | Date | Co-optee |
|---|---|---|---|---|---|
| Fianna Fáil | Peter "Chap" Cleere | Callan-Thomastown | Elected to 34th Dáil at the 2024 general election | 19 December 2024 | Brian Cleere |

== Sources ==
- Boyle, Tom; O'Dwyer, Michael (1999). Kilkenny County Council: A Century of Local Government. Kilkenny: Kilkenny County Council.
