= Phil Hogan =

Irish former politician (born 1960)

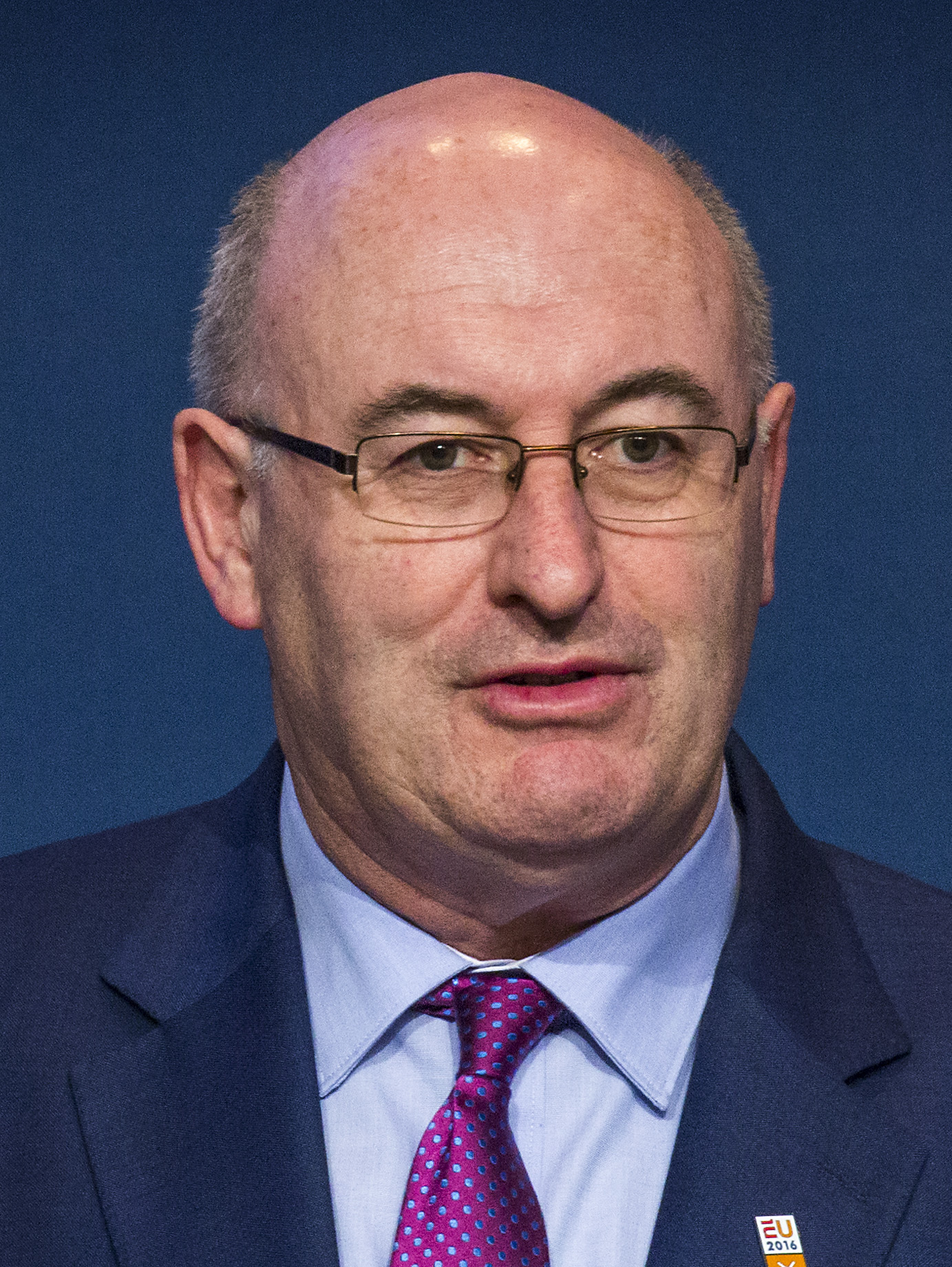
- Hogan in 2016

European Commissioner for Trade
- In office 1 December 2019 – 26 August 2020
- Commission: Von der Leyen I
- Preceded by: Cecilia Malmström
- Succeeded by: Valdis Dombrovskis

European Commissioner for Agriculture and Rural Development
- In office 1 November 2014 – 30 November 2019
- Commission: Juncker
- Preceded by: Dacian Cioloș
- Succeeded by: Janusz Wojciechowski

Minister for the Environment, Community and Local Government
- In office 9 March 2011 – 11 July 2014
- Taoiseach: Enda Kenny
- Preceded by: Éamon Ó Cuív
- Succeeded by: Alan Kelly

Minister of State
- 1994–1995: Finance

Teachta Dála
- In office June 1989 – 30 October 2014
- Constituency: Carlow–Kilkenny

Senator
- In office 25 April 1987 – 15 June 1989
- Constituency: Industrial and Commercial Panel

Personal details
- Born: 4 July 1960 (age 66) Kilkenny, Ireland
- Party: Fine Gael
- Other political affiliations: European People's Party
- Spouse: Cáit Ryan (m. 1991; sep. 2008)
- Children: 1
- Education: University College Cork

Philip Hogan (born 4 July 1960) is an Irish former Fine Gael politician who served as European Commissioner for Trade between 2019 and 2020, and previously European Commissioner for Agriculture and Rural Development between 2014 and 2019.

He previously served as Irish Minister for the Environment, Community and Local Government from 2011 to 2014 and Minister of State at the Department of Finance from 1994 to 1995, as well as a Teachta Dála (TD) for the Carlow–Kilkenny constituency from 1989 to 2014.

== Early and private life ==
Hogan was born in Kilkenny in 1960, and grew up on a farm near the village of Tullaroan.

He was educated locally in St. Joseph's College, Freshford, and St. Kieran's College, Kilkenny. Afterwards, he attended University College Cork, where he graduated with a Bachelor's degree in Economics and Geography and subsequently a Higher Diploma in Education from the same university.

After completing his university studies, he returned to Tullaroan to manage his family farm. During that time period, he also founded an insurance and real estate business in Urlingford in the 1980s.

== Local politics ==
Hogan first held political office at the age of 22, when he was elected to Kilkenny County Council. He retained that seat in the 1985 Local Elections when he topped the poll in his area.

Around the time of his 25th birthday, he was elected Council chair, the youngest council chairperson in the country. He served in this role on two separate occasions, first between 1985 and 1986 and then between 1989 and 1990.

In addition to his local political activities, Hogan was also a member of the South-Eastern Health Board between 1991 and 1999.

== National politics ==
=== 1987–1994 ===
From his experience on Kilkenny County Council, he decided to contest the 1987 general election in an unsuccessful bid. Soon afterwards, he was subsequently elected to Seanad Éireann as a senator for the Industrial and Commercial Panel, serving between 1987 and 1989.

After serving as a Senator in Seanad Éireann for two years, Hogan was subsequently elected to the lower house (Dáil Éireann) for the Carlow–Kilkenny constituency in the 1989 general election.

During his first few years in the Dáil, he was appointed to a number of key positions in opposition, serving in his first few years as the Opposition Spokesperson for the Food Industry (1989–1991), Consumer Affairs (1991–1993), and subsequently Regional Affairs & European Development (1993–1994).

Hogan also worked closely with the Fine Gael leader at the time, John Bruton. When Fine Gael formed the 'rainbow coalition' government in 1994, Hogan was offered the opportunity to serve as Minister of State at the Department of Finance with special responsibility for the Office of Public Works.

=== Minister of State and Chair of the Fine Gael parliamentary party ===
Hogan served as Minister of State at the Department of Finance with special responsibility for the Office of Public Works between December 1994 and February 1995. However, he subsequently tendered his resignation when a staff member accidentally sent out budget details to a journalist before it was announced in the Dáil. At the time, opposition parties described Hogan as 'the fall guy' for the budget leaks. Hogan was quoted as saying that "he [had] no regrets about his decision to resign. My only concern in all of this is to ensure that the integrity of the government is maintained." Following his resignation, Hogan returned to a backbench position in the government. Despite the controversy surrounding the incident, Hogan was promoted as Chair of the Fine Gael parliamentary party at the age of 35, a position he held until 2001. As chair, Hogan had the opportunity to develop the organisational roots of Fine Gael and strengthened the network between councillors and sub-groups within the Fine Gael party.

=== 2002 leadership election and subsequent leadership contest ===
In the run-up to the 2002 general election, Hogan was appointed Director of Organisation in Fine Gael. Upon the resignation of Michael Noonan as party leader of Fine Gael after the party's poor results in that election, Hogan opted to contest the subsequent election for the new Fine Gael leader. While he conceded the contest to Enda Kenny, he was appointed as Opposition Spokesperson for Enterprise, Trade and Employment and became a key member of the Fine Gael parliamentary party as it started the rebuilding process. Hogan was again appointed as Director of Organisation for the 2007 general election. Soon after, he became the Opposition Spokesperson for Fine Gael on Environment, Heritage and Local government for the next 4 years.

=== 2011 general election and Minister for the Environment, Community and Local Government ===
In the lead up to the 2011 General Election, Hogan was appointed by Fine Gael Leader Enda Kenny as National Director of Elections for Fine Gael. Following the 2011 general election, the most successful in the history of Fine Gael, in which it and Labour formed the largest coalition government in the state's history, Hogan was appointed by the Taoiseach as Minister for the Environment, Community and Local Government.

==== Local government reform ====
Hogan was responsible for several pieces of legislation to reform local government and introduce gender quotas so as to increase the representation of women in Irish political life. Hogan introduced the Local Governments Bill, which aimed to streamline local governance, abolishing 80 town councils with the overall number of councils operating in Ireland going from 114 to 31. The reforms were enacted as the Local Government Reform Act 2014 and were planned to come into effect in 2014, to coincide with the next scheduled local elections.

==== Gender quotas ====
In addition to local government reform, Hogan also introduced reform within the political party framework. As part of a series of reforms, he introduced measures to support female participation in politics. The Electoral (Amendment) (Political Funding) Bill 2011 would see parties lose half of their central exchequer funding unless the minority sex among their candidates accounts for 30 per cent of the entire national ticket at the next general election. The reform was brought in successfully alongside additional amendments to party political funding mechanisms.

In advance of the 2016 General Election, Hogan noted that "this legislation has had the unprecedented effect of all major political parties selecting a minimum of 30% women candidates. It is my firm belief that this will benefit Irish political life, and indeed Irish society as a whole. Yes, there will naturally be teething problems, but this necessary acceleration of equality will benefit us all in the coming years".

==== Taxes on property and water charges ====
As Minister, Hogan had responsibility for implementing a series of reforms as part of Ireland's agreement with the European Troika. In July 2011, he outlined plans for a €100 annual "household charge" that would become operable from January 2012 for two years, ahead of the introduction in 2014 of a full property tax based on site valuations. 250,000 households, some 14%, would be exempt from paying the charge. Hogan accepted that the tax would cause hardship to some families but presented it as the minimum possible charge he could have applied, saying it would cost "a modest €2 per week". This tax was the precursor to the Local property tax later introduced by Michael Noonan.

Hogan also confirmed that a new State utility company, Irish Water, would be set up in the autumn to oversee the process of installing meters in all domestic dwellings. That would pave the way, he said, for domestic water charges in two years' time based on household usage. The new charges would be the first form of property tax to be introduced, since the then Fianna Fáil government led by Jack Lynch abolished domestic rates in 1977.

== EU Agriculture and Rural Development Commissioner ==
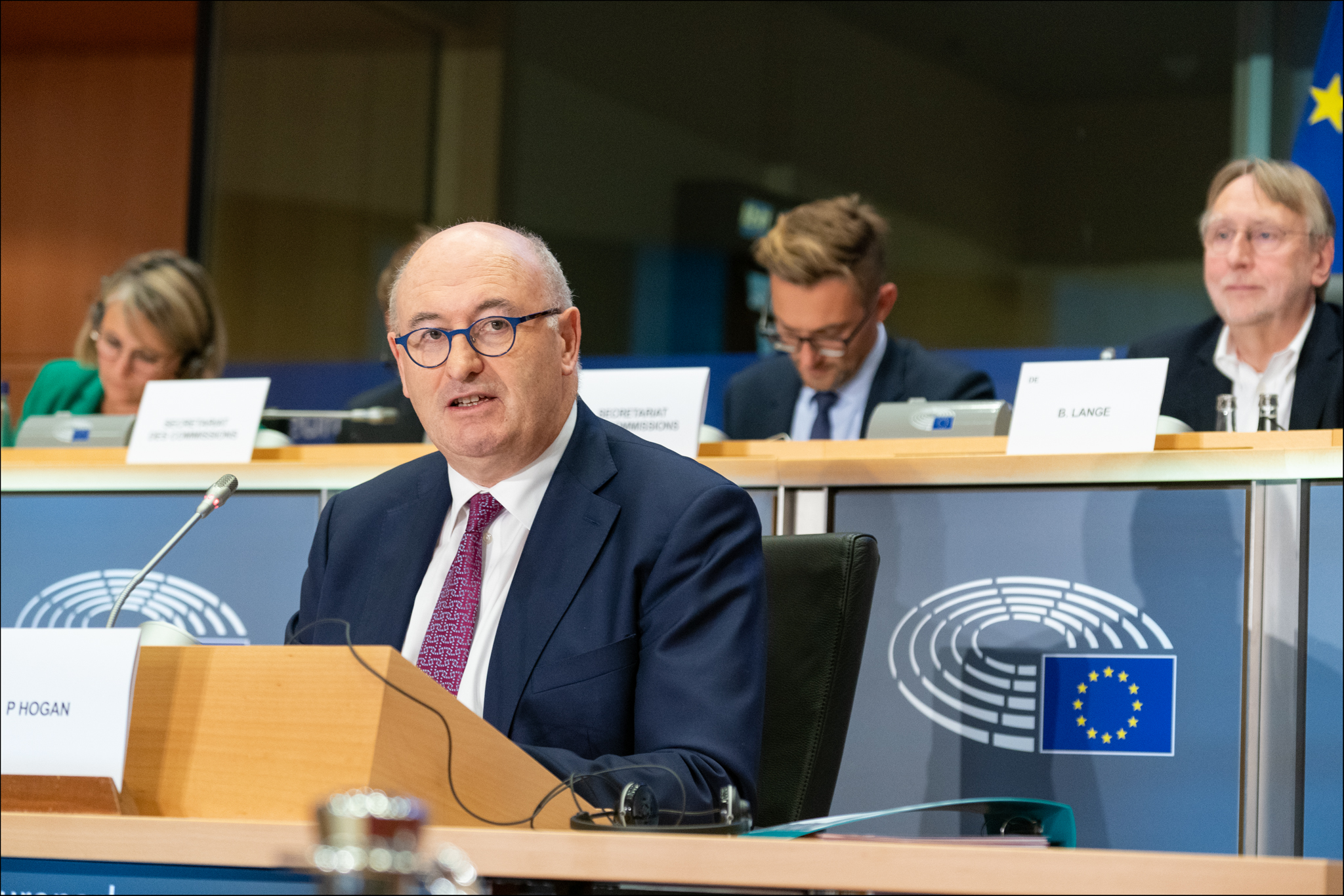
Hogan testifies before the European Parliament in 2019 as nominee for European Commissioner for Trade

On 10 September 2014, Hogan was nominated by Jean-Claude Juncker to be the European Commissioner for Agriculture and Rural Development taking office on 1 November. As Commissioner, Hogan stipulated that his priorities would be to "ensuring that rural development spending is well integrated into jobs- and growth-generating investment strategies at national and regional level".

=== Diplomatic Offensive ===
In 2016, Hogan embarked on a "diplomatic offensive" to build trade relations with non-EU states throughout the world and build new markets for European producers. So far, this has involved trade missions abroad to Mexico and Colombia, with trips to Japan, China and Kazakhstan scheduled for later in the year. Trade delegations of EU agri-businesses have accompanied the Commissioner on these trips to build relationships with third country counterparts.

=== Mercosur trade deal ===
In 2019 a free trade deal with Mercosur caused controversy in Ireland, with the farm lobby fearing competition from low-cost South American meat imports. Some of Hogan's Fine Gael colleagues suggested denying his expected reappointment to the incoming commission because of his involvement in the negotiations.

=== Conclusion of term ===
In mid-September 2019, the Juncker Commission handed the reins of power over to Ursula von der Leyen and her College of Commissioners, ending Hogan's term of office as Agriculture and Rural Development Commissioner.

== EU Trade Commissioner ==
Von der Leyen's proposal of Hogan as EU Trade Commissioner went smoothly through the EU Parliament when he "made clear that tackling China's unfair trade practices will be a major challenge during his five-year mandate." while he said that he would "work to conclude" the EU-China Comprehensive Agreement on Investment by the end of 2020. There was alarm in Parliament about the growing number of Chinese takeovers in the high-tech arena. Hogan was to "take over as EU Trade Commissioner in November after the Parliament's plenary confirms the full commission in a vote scheduled for 23 October." On 1 December, one month later than had originally been scheduled, Hogan, who was 59 years old at the time, was officially pronounced Trade Commissioner.

In light of the Oireachtas Golf Society scandal, Hogan resigned as EU Trade Commissioner on 26 August 2020.

=== On Huawei ===
On 17 January 2020, as Donald Trump was held to be bluffing by Hogan over the incompatibility of Five Eyes and Huawei. "I think that is a bit of sabre-rattling. I don't think that will actually happen... We can call [Trump's] bluff on that one, the US laying down conditions over Huawei... We can't say to Huawei, 'you cannot come into the EU', that's not what we want." Hogan's comments were echoed by German Chancellor Angela Merkel who said more diversification was needed "so that we never make ourselves dependent on one firm. I think it is wrong to simply exclude someone per se."

== Personal life ==
Hogan is separated with one adult son. He is also a keen amateur golfer who has been known to compete internationally in competitions in The Netherlands and Ireland.

== Controversies ==
On 24 August 2011, during an Oireachtas Golf Society outing, ex-Taoiseach John Bruton's former administrator, Anne O'Connell, alleged that Hogan made a lewd comment in her direction. She immediately complained in writing to the Taoiseach Enda Kenny. Hogan issued a letter of apology a few days later saying: "I unreservedly apologise for those remarks which were totally inappropriate in a personal sense. . . It was intended in a jocose and private basis and certainly not intended as insulting."

On 19 August 2020, Hogan attended an Oireachtas Golf Society dinner with 80 other attendees, while COVID-19 restrictions on such gatherings were in place. Although Hogan had been living in County Kildare—subject to a local lockdown during this time—he claimed that he was fully compliant with restrictions, despite having entered and exited the county on his way to Galway. In the fallout, known as 'Golfgate', a government minister in attendance, Dara Calleary, was forced to resign. Hogan resigned from his role as European Commissioner for Trade on 26 August 2020.

On 21 September 2021, it was reported that the European Commission was examining reports that Hogan had taken a job at US lobbyist DLA Piper. The Commission has a code of conduct for former Commissioners, which includes a two-year cooling-off period during which they cannot lobby former colleagues on topics related to the area they oversaw. Hogan's cooling-off period expired in August 2022.

Political offices
| Preceded by Noel Dempsey | Minister of State for the Office of Public Works; 1994–1995 | Succeeded by Jim Higgins |
| Preceded by Éamon Ó Cuív as Minister for the Environment, Heritage and Local Government | Minister for the Environment, Community and Local Government; 2011–2014 | Succeeded by Alan Kelly |
| Preceded by Máire Geoghegan-Quinn | Irish European Commissioner; 2014–2020 | Succeeded by Mairead McGuinness |
| Preceded by Dacian Cioloș | European Commissioner for Agriculture and Rural Development; 2014–2019 | Succeeded by Janusz Wojciechowski |
| Preceded by Cecilia Malmström | European Commissioner for Trade; 2019–2020 | Succeeded by Valdis Dombrovskis |
Party political offices
| Preceded by Jim Higgins | Chair of the Fine Gael parliamentary party 1995–2001 | Succeeded by Pádraic McCormack |

| Dáil | Election | Deputy (Party) | Deputy (Party) | Deputy (Party) | Deputy (Party) | Deputy (Party) |
|---|---|---|---|---|---|---|
| 2nd | 1921 | Edward Aylward (SF) | W. T. Cosgrave (SF) | James Lennon (SF) | Gearóid O'Sullivan (SF) | 4 seats 1921–1923 |
| 3rd | 1922 | Patrick Gaffney (Lab) | W. T. Cosgrave (PT-SF) | Denis Gorey (FP) | Gearóid O'Sullivan (PT-SF) | 4 seats 1921–1923 |
| 4th | 1923 | Edward Doyle (Lab) | W. T. Cosgrave (CnaG) | Denis Gorey (FP) | Michael Shelly (Rep) | Seán Gibbons (CnaG) |
| 4th | 1925 by-election | Edward Doyle (Lab) | W. T. Cosgrave (CnaG) | Denis Gorey (FP) | Michael Shelly (Rep) | Thomas Bolger (CnaG) |
| 5th | 1927 (Jun) | Edward Doyle (Lab) | W. T. Cosgrave (CnaG) | Denis Gorey (CnaG) | Thomas Derrig (FF) | Richard Holohan (FP) |
| 6th | 1927 (Sep) | Edward Doyle (Lab) | W. T. Cosgrave (CnaG) | Peter de Loughry (CnaG) | Thomas Derrig (FF) | Richard Holohan (FP) |
| 6th | 1927 by-election | Edward Doyle (Lab) | Denis Gorey (CnaG) | Peter de Loughry (CnaG) | Thomas Derrig (FF) | Richard Holohan (FP) |
| 7th | 1932 | Francis Humphreys (FF) | Denis Gorey (CnaG) | Desmond FitzGerald (CnaG) | Thomas Derrig (FF) | Seán Gibbons (FF) |
| 8th | 1933 | James Pattison (Lab) | Richard Holohan (NCP) | Desmond FitzGerald (CnaG) | Thomas Derrig (FF) | Seán Gibbons (FF) |
| 9th | 1937 | Constituency abolished. See Kilkenny and Carlow–Kildare | | | | |

| Dáil | Election | Deputy (Party) | Deputy (Party) | Deputy (Party) | Deputy (Party) | Deputy (Party) |
|---|---|---|---|---|---|---|
| 13th | 1948 | James Pattison (NLP) | Thomas Walsh (FF) | Thomas Derrig (FF) | Joseph Hughes (FG) | Patrick Crotty (FG) |
| 14th | 1951 | Francis Humphreys (FF) | Thomas Walsh (FF) | Thomas Derrig (FF) | Joseph Hughes (FG) | Patrick Crotty (FG) |
| 15th | 1954 | James Pattison (Lab) | Thomas Walsh (FF) | Thomas Derrig (FF) | Joseph Hughes (FG) | Patrick Crotty (FG) |
| 15th | 1956 by-election | James Pattison (Lab) | Martin Medlar (FF) | Thomas Derrig (FF) | Joseph Hughes (FG) | Patrick Crotty (FG) |
| 16th | 1957 | Francis Humphreys (FF) | Martin Medlar (FF) | Jim Gibbons (FF) | Joseph Hughes (FG) | Patrick Crotty (FG) |
| 16th | 1960 by-election | Patrick Teehan (FF) | Martin Medlar (FF) | Jim Gibbons (FF) | Joseph Hughes (FG) | Patrick Crotty (FG) |
| 17th | 1961 | Séamus Pattison (Lab) | Martin Medlar (FF) | Jim Gibbons (FF) | Desmond Governey (FG) | Patrick Crotty (FG) |
| 18th | 1965 | Séamus Pattison (Lab) | Tom Nolan (FF) | Jim Gibbons (FF) | Desmond Governey (FG) | Patrick Crotty (FG) |
| 19th | 1969 | Séamus Pattison (Lab) | Tom Nolan (FF) | Jim Gibbons (FF) | Desmond Governey (FG) | Kieran Crotty (FG) |
| 20th | 1973 | Séamus Pattison (Lab) | Tom Nolan (FF) | Jim Gibbons (FF) | Desmond Governey (FG) | Kieran Crotty (FG) |
| 21st | 1977 | Séamus Pattison (Lab) | Tom Nolan (FF) | Jim Gibbons (FF) | Liam Aylward (FF) | Kieran Crotty (FG) |
| 22nd | 1981 | Séamus Pattison (Lab) | Tom Nolan (FF) | Desmond Governey (FG) | Liam Aylward (FF) | Kieran Crotty (FG) |
| 23rd | 1982 (Feb) | Séamus Pattison (Lab) | Jim Gibbons (FF) | Desmond Governey (FG) | Liam Aylward (FF) | Kieran Crotty (FG) |
| 24th | 1982 (Nov) | Séamus Pattison (Lab) | M. J. Nolan (FF) | Dick Dowling (FG) | Liam Aylward (FF) | Kieran Crotty (FG) |
| 25th | 1987 | Séamus Pattison (Lab) | M. J. Nolan (FF) | Martin Gibbons (PDs) | Liam Aylward (FF) | Kieran Crotty (FG) |
| 26th | 1989 | Séamus Pattison (Lab) | M. J. Nolan (FF) | Phil Hogan (FG) | Liam Aylward (FF) | John Browne (FG) |
| 27th | 1992 | Séamus Pattison (Lab) | M. J. Nolan (FF) | Phil Hogan (FG) | Liam Aylward (FF) | John Browne (FG) |
| 28th | 1997 | Séamus Pattison (Lab) | John McGuinness (FF) | Phil Hogan (FG) | Liam Aylward (FF) | John Browne (FG) |
| 29th | 2002 | Séamus Pattison (Lab) | John McGuinness (FF) | Phil Hogan (FG) | Liam Aylward (FF) | M. J. Nolan (FF) |
| 30th | 2007 | Mary White (GP) | John McGuinness (FF) | Phil Hogan (FG) | Bobby Aylward (FF) | M. J. Nolan (FF) |
| 31st | 2011 | Ann Phelan (Lab) | John McGuinness (FF) | Phil Hogan (FG) | John Paul Phelan (FG) | Pat Deering (FG) |
| 31st | 2015 by-election | Ann Phelan (Lab) | John McGuinness (FF) | Bobby Aylward (FF) | John Paul Phelan (FG) | Pat Deering (FG) |
| 32nd | 2016 | Kathleen Funchion (SF) | John McGuinness (FF) | Bobby Aylward (FF) | John Paul Phelan (FG) | Pat Deering (FG) |
| 33rd | 2020 | Kathleen Funchion (SF) | John McGuinness (FF) | Jennifer Murnane O'Connor (FF) | John Paul Phelan (FG) | Malcolm Noonan (GP) |
| 34th | 2024 | Natasha Newsome Drennan (SF) | John McGuinness (FF) | Jennifer Murnane O'Connor (FF) | Catherine Callaghan (FG) | Peter "Chap" Cleere (FF) |
