= 2009 Carlow County Council election =

Part of the 2009 Irish local elections

← 2004	5 June 2009	2014 →

All 21 seats to Carlow County Council
	First party	Second party	Third party
Party	Fine Gael	Labour	Fianna Fáil
Seats won	10	5	4
Seat change	+3	+1	-4
	Fourth party	Fifth party	Sixth party
Party	Independent	Green	Progressive Democrats
Seats won	2	0	0
Seat change	+2	-1	-1
- Area of Carlow County Council

An election to Carlow County Council took place on 5 June 2009 as part of that year's Irish local elections. 21 councillors were elected from five local electoral areas (LEAs) for a five-year term of office on the electoral system of proportional representation by means of the single transferable vote (PR-STV).

== Results by party ==
Party	Seats	±	First Pref. votes	FPv%	±%
Fine Gael	10	+3	9,186	39.28	
Labour	5	+1	4,545	19.44	
Fianna Fáil	4	-4	6,476	24.69	
Independent	2	+2	2,372	10.14	
Green	0	-1	334	1.43	
Progressive Democrats	—	-1	—	—	
Totals	21	-	23,385	100.00	—

== Results by local electoral area ==
=== Borris ===
Borris - 4 seats
Party	Candidate	FPv%	Count					
Party	Candidate	FPv%	1	2	3	4	5	6
Fine Gael	Tommy Kinsella*	22.64	1,238					
Labour	Willie Quinn*	18.67	1,021	1,064	1,079	1,230		
Independent	Charlie Murphy	15.00	820	838	885	925	958	1,017
Fine Gael	John Murphy	14.90	815	870	916	972	1,017	1,077
Fianna Fáil	P.J. Kavanagh*	11.59	634	639	659	687	692	932
Fianna Fáil	Dolores Barron	7.97	436	447	455	491	507	
Green	Alan Price*	6.11	334	345	361			
Independent	Billy Nolan	3.11	170	171				
Electorate: 8,722 Valid: 5,468 (62.69%) Spoilt: 68 Quota: 1,094 Turnout: 5,536 (63.47%)

=== Carlow East ===
Carlow East - 4 seats
Party	Candidate	FPv%	Count					
Party	Candidate	FPv%	1	2	3	4	5	6
Fianna Fáil	Jennifer Murnane-O'Connor*	26.06	1,090					
Fine Gael	Fergal Browne	21.52	900					
Labour	Caroline Townsend	13.01	544	595	644	658	934	
Fianna Fáil	Joe McDonald*	10.86	454	557	589	597	661	688
Labour	Noel Barcoe	10.57	442	489	555	565		
Fine Gael	Wayne Fennell	10.35	433	451	593	624	724	794
Fine Gael	Declan Alcock*	7.63	319	353				
Electorate: 7,422 Valid: 4,182 (56.35%) Spoilt: 86 Quota: 837 Turnout: 4,268 (57.50%)

=== Carlow West ===
Carlow West - 5 seats
Party	Candidate	FPv%	Count						
Party	Candidate	FPv%	1	2	3	4	5	6	7
Fine Gael	Michael Abbey*	21.32	864						
Fine Gael	Tom O'Neill	14.96	606	686					
Independent	Walter Lacey*	13.13	532	557	598	671	725		
Fianna Fáil	Ann Ahern (née Long)	13.10	531	556	603	837			
Sinn Féin	John Cassin	11.20	454	463	503	534	558	564	564
Labour	Des Hurley*	10.93	443	467	487	519	553	574	584
Fianna Fáil	Rody Kelly*	9.13	370	387	440				
Fianna Fáil	Lorraine Hynes*	3.65	148	152					
Independent	Ken Murnane	2.57	104	108					
Electorate: 8,231 Valid: 4,052 (49.23%) Spoilt: 55 Quota: 676 Turnout: 4,107 (49.90%)

=== Muinebheag ===
Muinebheag - 4 seats
Party	Candidate	FPv%	Count						
Party	Candidate	FPv%	1	2	3	4	5	6	7
Labour	Jim Townsend*	20.07	1,050						
Fine Gael	Denis Foley*	19.75	1,033	1,061					
Fine Gael	Michael Doran*	16.42	859	882	886	887	962	1,012	1,177
Fianna Fáil	Arthur McDonald*	13.38	700	722	724	724	746	875	978
Fianna Fáil	Eddie Cullen	9.39	491	501	502	503	525	569	605
Labour	Liam O'Brien	6.73	352	379	384	385	426	508	
Independent	David O'Brien*	6.16	322	359	360	360	406		
Independent	Martin Nevin	4.32	226	259	260	260			
Independent	James Lakes	3.48	182						
Independent	Patrick Rooney	0.31	16						
Electorate: 8,751 Valid: 5,231 (59.78%) Spoilt: 80 Quota: 1,047 Turnout: 5,311 (60.69%)

=== Tullow ===
Tullow - 4 seats
Party	Candidate	FPv%	Count			
Party	Candidate	FPv%	1	2	3	4
Fianna Fáil	John Pender*	26.34	1,168			
Fine Gael	Pat Deering	17.66	783	818	959	
Fine Gael	Pat O'Toole	15.92	706	756	818	827
Labour	William Paton*	15.63	693	750	850	864
Fine Gael	Fred Hunter*	14.21	630	658	763	812
Fianna Fáil	Sophie Kelly	10.24	454	565		
Electorate: 7,928 Valid: 4,434 (55.93%) Spoilt: 67 Quota: 887 Turnout: 4,501 (56.77%)
