= 1999 Carlow County Council election =

Part of the 1999 Irish local elections

← 1991	10 June 1999	2004 →

All 21 seats to Carlow County Council
	First party	Second party	Third party
Party	Fianna Fáil	Fine Gael	Labour
Seats won	9	7	3
Seat change	-	-	-1
	Fourth party	Fifth party
Party	Progressive Democrats	Green
Seats won	1	1
Seat change	-	+1
- Map showing the area of Carlow County Council
Council control after election
TBD

An election to Carlow County Council took place on 10 June 1999 as part of that year's Irish local elections. 21 councillors were elected from five local electoral areas (LEAs) for a five-year term of office on the electoral system of proportional representation by means of the single transferable vote (PR-STV).

== Results by party ==
Party	Seats	±	First Pref. votes	FPv%	±%
Fianna Fáil	9	-	6,397	35.25	
Fine Gael	7	-	5,501	30.31	
Labour	3	-1	3,193	17.59	
Progressive Democrats	1	-	793	4.37	
Green	1	+1	658	3.63	
Totals	21	-	18,149	100.00	—

== Results by local electoral area ==
=== Borris ===
Borris - 3 seats
Party	Candidate	FPv%	Count		
Party	Candidate	FPv%	1	2	3
Green	Mary White	21.98	582	627	700
Labour	Michael Meaney*	20.73	549	584	647
Fine Gael	Michael Doyle*	19.45	515	550	604
Fianna Fáil	Dolores Barron	16.99	450	509	654
Fianna Fáil	Siobhan Minchin	13.18	349	365	
Independent	Bridie Lawlor	7.67	203		
Electorate: 4,591 Valid: 2,648 (57.68%) Spoilt: 34 Quota: 663 Turnout: 2,682 (58.42%)

=== Carlow No.1 ===
Carlow No.1 - 3 seats
Party	Candidate	FPv%	Count			
Party	Candidate	FPv%	1	2	3	4
Fianna Fáil	Jimmy Murnane*	22.78	519	537	655	
Fianna Fáil	Joe McDonald	19.80	451	482	517	546
Fine Gael	Declan Alcock*	16.68	380	471	556	599
Labour	Des Hurley*	15.14	345	370		
Progressive Democrats	Senator Jim Gibbons Jnr	14.93	340	395	457	469
Fine Gael	Colette Fennelly	10.67	243			
Electorate: 4,869 Valid: 2,278 (46.79%) Spoilt: 44 Quota: 570 Turnout: 2,322 (47.69%)

=== Carlow No.2 ===
Carlow No.2 - 5 seats
Party	Candidate	FPv%	Count					
Party	Candidate	FPv%	1	2	3	4	5	6
Fine Gael	John Browne TD*	17.39	625					
Fine Gael	Michael Abbey*	16.72	601					
Fianna Fáil	M.J. Nolan TD*	14.30	514	523	565	569	624	
Progressive Democrats	Walter Lacey*	12.60	453	468	508	516	622	
Fianna Fáil	Rody Kelly	10.77	387	400	443	447	499	511
Labour	Tony O'Sullivan	9.54	343	359	386	391		
Fianna Fáil	Nicholas Carpenter*	9.10	327	348	400	404	468	480
Fianna Fáil	Jennifer Murnane-O'Connor	6.12	220	232				
Independent	Conor Dowling	3.45	124					
Electorate: 8,791 Valid: 3,594 (40.88%) Spoilt: 65 Quota: 600 Turnout: 3,659 (41.62%)

=== Muinebheag ===
Muinebheag - 5 seats
Party	Candidate	FPv%	Count						
Party	Candidate	FPv%	1	2	3	4	5	6	7
Labour	Jim Townsend*	15.23	671	706	719	727	754		
Fianna Fáil	Enda Nolan*	13.30	586	588	590	621	633	691	776
Fine Gael	Denis Foley	12.48	550	552	558	578	640	677	748
Fianna Fáil	Arthur McDonald*	10.92	481	483	495	540	562	634	690
Labour	John Clarke	10.05	443	456	468	508	516	528	582
Fine Gael	Mary McDonald*	9.01	397	405	413	417	486	537	675
Independent	Martin Nevin	7.99	352	355	382	391	410	490	
Fianna Fáil	Eddie Cullen	7.47	329	337	344	348	360		
Fine Gael	John Hughes	5.38	237	240	243	247			
Fianna Fáil	Paddy Kiely	3.95	174	176	179				
Independent	John McNally	2.32	102	176	179				
Labour	Liz Dunne	1.91	84						
Electorate: 8,148 Valid: 4,406 (54.07%) Spoilt: 77 Quota: 735 Turnout: 4,483 (55.02%)

=== Tullow ===
Tullow - 5 seats
Party	Candidate	FPv%	Count							
Party	Candidate	FPv%	1	2	3	4	5	6	7	8
Labour	William Paton	18.11	842							
Fine Gael	Fred Hunter*	14.54	676	684	691	712	768	915		
Fianna Fáil	John Pender*	14.00	651	660	673	718	735	825		
Fine Gael	Michael Deering*	13.31	619	627	639	649	690	860		
Fianna Fáil	Noel Kennedy	10.71	498	502	505	516	522	531	545	564
Fianna Fáil	P.J. Kavanagh	9.92	461	464	468	498	601	627	651	688
Fine Gael	Pat O'Toole*	8.52	396	412	431	454	506			
Fine Gael	Michael Murphy	5.64	262	263	266	298				
Independent	Billy Nolan	3.61	168	188	194					
Green	Danny Kelly	1.63	76							
Electorate: 8,611 Valid: 4,649 (53.99%) Spoilt: 72 Quota: 775 Turnout: 4,721 (54.83%)
