= 1985 Carlow County Council election =

Part of the 1985 Irish local elections

← 1979	20 June 1985	1991 →

All 21 seats on Carlow County Council
	First party	Second party	Third party
Party	Fianna Fáil	Fine Gael	Labour
Seats won	10	7	3
Seat change	+2	-2	0
	Fourth party
Party	Independent
Seats won	1
Seat change	0
- Map showing the area of Carlow County Council
Council control before election
Fine Gael/Labour
Council control after election
Fine Gael/Labour

An election to all 21 seats on Carlow County Council took place on 20 June 1985 as part of that year's Irish local elections. Councillors were elected from four local electoral areas (LEAs) for a five-year term of office on the electoral system of proportional representation by means of the single transferable vote (PR-STV). This term was extended for a further year, to 1991.

== Results by party ==
Party	Seats	±	First Pref. votes	FPv%	±%
Fianna Fáil	10	+2	7,567	44.31	
Fine Gael	7	-2	5,061	29.64	
Labour	3	0	3,191	18.69	
Independent	1	0	993	5.81	
Total	21	0	17,077	100.00	—

== Results by local electoral area ==
=== Borris ===
Borris: 4 seats
Party	Candidate	FPv%	Count			
Party	Candidate	FPv%	1	2	3	4
Labour	Michael Meaney*		1,063			
Fianna Fáil	Mary Kinsella		598	670	742	
Fine Gael	Cyril Hughes		500	607	865	
Fianna Fáil	Liam Murphy*		445	508	567	620
Fianna Fáil	Richard O'Driscoll*		434	490	508	522
Fine Gael	Margaret Kavanagh*		360	444		
Electorate: 5,424 Valid: 3,400 (62.68%) Quota: 681

=== Carlow ===
Carlow: 7 seats
Party	Candidate	FPv%	Count												
Party	Candidate	FPv%	1	2	3	4	5	6	7	8	9	10	11	12	13
Independent	Michael Kearns		699												
Fine Gael	Sen. John Browne*		690												
Fianna Fáil	Patrick Carpenter*		618	623	625	630	658	673							
Fianna Fáil	M. J. Nolan TD*		543	546	547	550	568	574	574	592	642	713			
Fianna Fáil	Jimmy Murnane		409	411	412	421	433	434	434	441	472	533	552	574	623
Fine Gael	Carmel McDonnell*		379	384	392	394	403	429	430	447	454	466	469	522	545
Fine Gael	Patrick Governey		367	370	376	380	388	416	421	433	441	461	464	517	533
Fianna Fáil	James Brady		308	311	311	316	323	329	330	341	369	386	404	435	504
Sinn Féin	Kieran Foley		265	266	266	282	286	297	298	321	326	331	333	361	
Labour	Cecil Whelan		220	223	224	241	243	252	253	278	284	296	300		
Fianna Fáil	Jim Nolan*		177	178	179	181	192	194	194	204	228				
Fianna Fáil	James Doyle		170	171	173	175	181	182	182	187					
Independent	George Russell		154	157	157	170	171	174	174						
Fianna Fáil	T.J. Byrne		111	112	112	113									
Fine Gael	Eileen Brophy		107	109	113	115	118								
Workers' Party	Margaret O'Brien		91	93	93										
Electorate: 10,225 Valid: 5,308 (53.26%) Spoilt: 138 Quota: 664 Turnout: 5,446

=== Muinebheag ===
Muinebheag: 5 seats
Party	Candidate	FPv%	Count										
Party	Candidate	FPv%	1	2	3	4	5	6	7	8	9	10	11
Labour	John McNally*		864										
Labour	Jim Townsend*		727	734	758								
Fianna Fáil	Martin Nevin*		492	496	515	517	541	568	578	695	784		
Fianna Fáil	Tom Nolan		414	418	434	434	448	575	584	641	883		
Fine Gael	Mary McDonald*		360	361	367	367	401	422	525	564	578	596	607
Fianna Fáil	Donie Nolan		318	325	327	327	332	363	376	423			
Fianna Fáil	Eddie Cullen		288	289	292	292	298	320	331				
Fine Gael	Kay Brophy		272	273	276	277	302	309					
Fine Gael	Joe Manning*		250	253	264	265	369	387	529	548	569	588	592
Fianna Fáil	Arthur McDonald		247	256	270	270	292						
Fine Gael	Denis Foley		232	237	250	251							
Independent	John Curran		49										
Electorate: 6,439 Valid: 4,513 (71.28%) Spoilt: 77 Quota: 753 Turnout: 4,590

=== Tullow ===
Tullow: 5 seats
Party	Candidate	FPv%	Count				
Party	Candidate	FPv%	1	2	3	4	5
Fine Gael	Michael Deering*		730				
Fianna Fáil	Arthur Kennedy*		681				
Fianna Fáil	Bill Bolger*		567	579	599	653	
Fianna Fáil	John Pender		558	561	568	656	
Fine Gael	Brendan Brophy*		448	481	484	500	596
Fine Gael	Pat O'Toole*		366	394	397	405	535
Labour	Michael Hickey		317	327	329	346	
Fianna Fáil	Sean Gallagher		189	190	193		
Electorate: TBC Valid: 3,856 Spoilt: 54 Quota: 643 Turnout: 3,910
