= 1991 Carlow County Council election =

Part of the 1991 Irish local elections

← 1985	27 June 1991	1999 →

All 21 seats on Carlow County Council
	First party	Second party	Third party
Party	Fianna Fáil	Fine Gael	Labour
Seats won	9	7	4
Seat change	-1	-	+1
	Fourth party	Fifth party
Party	Progressive Democrats	Independent
Seats won	1	0
Seat change	+1	-1
- Map showing the area of Carlow County Council
Council control before election
Fine Gael/Labour
Council control after election
Fine Gael/Labour

An election to Carlow County Council took place on 27 June 1991 as part of that year's Irish local elections. 21 councillors were elected from four local electoral areas (LEAs) for a five-year term of office on the electoral system of proportional representation by means of the single transferable vote (PR-STV). This term was extended twice, first to 1998, then to 1999.

== Results by party ==
Party	Seats	±	First Pref. votes	FPv%	±%
Fianna Fáil	9	-1	6,767	39.4	
Fine Gael	7	-	5,312	30.9	
Labour	4	+1	4,002	23.3	
Progressive Democrats	1	+1	436	2.54	
Independent	0	-1	670	3.9	
Totals	21	-	17,187	100.0	—

== Results by local electoral area ==
=== Borris ===
Borris - 4 seats
Party	Candidate	FPv%	Count			
Party	Candidate	FPv%	1	2	3	4
Labour	Michael Meaney*	29.2%	1,020			
Fianna Fáil	Mary Kinsella*	16.4%	575	636	741	
Fianna Fáil	Brendan Walsh	15.5%	543	603	655	667
Fine Gael	Michael Doyle*	14.2%	498	577	596	808
Fianna Fáil	Liam Murphy*	9.1%	317	361	446	493
Fine Gael	Ciaran Redmond	7.9%	278	313	331	
Fianna Fáil	David Moore	7.6%	267	308		
Electorate: 5,866 Valid: 3,498 (59.63%) Spoilt: 36 Quota: 700 Turnout: 3,534 (60.25%)

=== Carlow ===
Carlow - 7 seats
Party	Candidate	FPv%	Count										
Party	Candidate	FPv%	1	2	3	4	5	6	7	8	9	10	11
Fine Gael	John Browne TD*	14.5%	756										
Fianna Fáil	Patrick Carpenter*	10.7%	560	575	588	648	673						
Labour	Des Hurley	10.7%	557	558	563	592	707						
Fianna Fáil	Jimmy Murnane*	10.4%	545	551	554	566	576	580	582	614	635	649	664
Progressive Democrats	Walter Lacey	8.3%	436	439	451	475	499	513	516	542	595	696	
Fine Gael	Declan Alcock	7.9%	413	414	428	440	450	460	462	486	570	739	
Fianna Fáil	M.J. Nolan TD*	7.3%	379	389	395	406	413	414	416	489	524	563	578
Fianna Fáil	Rody Kelly	6%	314	325	332	344	362	363	364	428	444	474	495
Fine Gael	Patrick Governey*	4.9%	255	257	278	289	299	306	308	322			
Fine Gael	Sean Whelan	4.8%	253	261	275	275	289	301	308	336	407		
Fianna Fáil	Joe McDonald	4.7%	243	253	256	263	277	282	282				
Labour	Cecil Whelan	4.6%	238	242	245	257							
Independent	James Brady	3.8%	201	202	204								
Independent	Sean Prendergast	1.4%	73										
Electorate: 10,567 Valid: 5,223 (49.43%) Spoilt: 43 Quota: 653 Turnout: 5,265 (49.82%)

=== Muinebheag ===
Muinebheag - 5 seats
Party	Candidate	FPv%	Count								
Party	Candidate	FPv%	1	2	3	4	5	6	7	8	9
Labour	John McNally*	21.7%	980								
Labour	Jim Townsend*	18.1%	818								
Fianna Fáil	Arthur McDonald	11%	496	568	581	589	614	631	713	851	
Fianna Fáil	Enda Nolan	9.5%	427	444	451	462	478	526	559	593	648
Fine Gael	Mary McDonald*	8.7%	392	409	413	422	509	651	695	795	
Fianna Fáil	Martin Nevin*	6.8%	305	332	337	344	361	371	475	527	571
Fianna Fáil	Eddie Cullen	6.5%	292	306	312	314	321	330			
Independent	Denis Foley	5.9%	264	298	329	336	376	409	437		
Fine Gael	Ann Brennan	5.5%	246	250	252	273	311				
Fine Gael	Stephen Maher	5%	224	246	249	250					
Independent	John Curran	1.2%	56	74							
Independent	William Dillon	0.2%	9	12							
Electorate: 7,033 Valid: 4,509 (64.11%) Spoilt: 42 Quota: 752 Turnout: 4,551 (64.71%)

=== Tullow ===
Tullow - 5 seats
Party	Candidate	FPv%	Count						
Party	Candidate	FPv%	1	2	3	4	5	6	7
Fine Gael	Michael Deering*	17.3%	683	627	639	649	690	860	
Fianna Fáil	John Pender*	16.6%	656	658	687				
Fine Gael	Pat O'Toole	13.8%	548	551	552	553	558	680	
Fine Gael	Fred Hunter	11.3%	449	459	472	472	478	569	617
Labour	Michael Hickey	9.8%	389	407	430	432	435	482	537
Fianna Fáil	Arthur Kennedy*	9%	358	370	417	430	432	452	585
Fine Gael	Brendan Brophy*	8%	317	323	327	330	335		
Fianna Fáil	Paddy Condon	6.4%	252	285	340	344	346	368	
Fianna Fáil	Mary Ann Dunne	4.2%	165	186					
Independent	Bill Leonard	3.5%	140						
Electorate: 6,338 Valid: 3,957 (62.43%) Spoilt: 58 Quota: 660 Turnout: 4,015 (63.35%)
