= Robert Aylward =

Robert Aylward may refer to:

- Bob Aylward (1911–1974), Irish Fianna Fáil politician, senator from 1973–1974
- His son Bobby Aylward (1955–2022), Irish Fianna Fáil politician, TD 2007–2011
- Robert Aylward (Canadian politician) (born 1946), politician in Newfoundland, Canada
- Robert Aylward (sport shooter), see 300 metre rifle three positions
