= 2019 Carlow County Council election =

Part of the 2019 Irish local elections

| ← 2014 | 24 May 2019 | 2024 → |

18 seats on Carlow County Council 10 seats needed for a majority
- Turnout: 49.4% ▼2.9%
| | First party | Second party | Third party |
|---|---|---|---|
| Party | Fianna Fáil | Fine Gael | Labour |
| Seats won | 6 | 6 | 2 |
| Seat change | ▲1 | Steady | Steady |
| | Fourth party | Fifth party | Sixth party |
| Party | Sinn Féin | People Before Profit | Independent |
| Seats won | 1 | 1 | 2 |
| Seat change | ▼2 | ▲1 | Steady |
- Results by local electoral area
Council control after election
TBD

An election to all 18 seats on Carlow County Council was held on 24 May 2019 as part of the 2019 Irish local elections. County Carlow was divided into three local electoral areas (LEAs) to elect councillors for a five-year term of office on the electoral system of proportional representation by means of the single transferable vote (PR-STV).

== Boundary review ==
At the 2014 Carlow County Council election, there were two LEAs, of 10 and 8 seats. The terms of reference of the 2018 local electoral area boundary committee required a maximum of seven councillors in each LEA. Following the recommendations of committee, County Carlow was divided into three LEAs.

== Overview ==
Fianna Fáil gained an additional seat to emerge level with Fine Gael on 6 seats apiece and a higher share of the vote. Sinn Féin lost two seats, and Cllr John Cassin was re-elected as an Independent. Labour retained two seats, while Adrienne Wallace, who contested South for Solidarity–People Before Profit in the European Parliament election held on the same day, gained a seat for the party.

== Results by party ==
| Party | Seats | ± | 1st pref | FPv% | ±% |
|---|---|---|---|---|---|
| Fianna Fáil | 6 | ▲1 | 7,244 | 33.55 | ▲4.65 |
| Fine Gael | 6 | Steady | 6,769 | 31.35 | ▲4.35 |
| Labour | 2 | Steady | 1,910 | 8.85 | ▼4.35 |
| Sinn Féin | 1 | ▼2 | 1,817 | 8.41 | ▼4.29 |
| People Before Profit | 1 | ▲1 | 448 | 2.07 | New |
| Aontú | 0 | Steady | 310 | 1.44 | New |
| Renua | 0 | Steady | 288 | 1.33 | New |
| Independent | 2 | Steady | 2,807 | 13.00 | ▼1.00 |
| Total | 18 | Steady | 21,593 | 100.00 | |

== Results by local electoral area ==
*: Outgoing councillor elected in 2014.
†: Outgoing councillor coopted subsequent to the 2014 election.

=== Carlow ===
Carlow: 7 Seats
| Party | Candidate | FPv% | Count | | | | | | | | |
| Party | Candidate | FPv% | 1 | 2 | 3 | 4 | 5 | 6 | 7 | 8 | 9 |
|---|---|---|---|---|---|---|---|---|---|---|---|
| Fianna Fáil | Fintan Phelan | 23.26% | 1,711 | | | | | | | | |
| Fianna Fáil | Andrea Dalton | 14.76% | 1,086 | | | | | | | | |
| Fine Gael | Fergal Browne | 12.10% | 890 | 1,052 | | | | | | | |
| Fianna Fáil | Ken Murnane | 10.78% | 793 | 994 | | | | | | | |
| Fine Gael | Tom O'Neill | 7.33% | 539 | 627 | 664 | 693 | 721 | 734 | 747 | 785 | 830 |
| Independent | John Cassin | 7.16% | 527 | 600 | 630 | 644 | 671 | 688 | 761 | 829 | 902 |
| People Before Profit | Adrienne Wallace | 6.09% | 448 | 522 | 549 | 586 | 599 | 617 | 701 | 763 | 814 |
| Fine Gael | Wayne Fennell | 5.87% | 432 | 508 | 541 | 558 | 604 | 613 | 630 | 686 | 745 |
| Aontú | Mary Hande | 4.21% | 310 | 345 | 360 | 367 | 377 | 385 | 406 | 422 | |
| Sinn Féin | Ciarán Dooley | 3.28% | 241 | 261 | 267 | 271 | 283 | 288 | | | |
| Independent | Bernard Jennings | 3.18% | 234 | 270 | 280 | 293 | 303 | 307 | 326 | | |
| Labour | Kevin Byrne | 1.97% | 145 | 171 | 179 | 186 | | | | | |
Electorate: 16,425 Valid: 7,356 Spoilt: 121 Quota: 920 Turnout: 7,477 (45.52%)

=== Muinebeag ===
Muinebeag: 5 Seats
| Party | Candidate | FPv% | Count | | | | |
| Party | Candidate | FPv% | 1 | 2 | 3 | 4 | 5 |
|---|---|---|---|---|---|---|---|
| Fine Gael | Tommy Kinsella | 23.06% | 1,617 | | | | |
| Labour | Willie Quinn | 14.02% | 983 | 1,147 | 1,271 | | |
| Sinn Féin | Andy Gladney | 14.48% | 1,015 | 1,054 | 1,147 | 1,175 | |
| Fine Gael | Michael Doran | 12.32% | 864 | 916 | 944 | 951 | 1,185 |
| Fianna Fáil | Arthur McDonald | 12.17% | 853 | 893 | 967 | 981 | 1,153 |
| Fianna Fáil | Josie Daly | 9.63% | 675 | 698 | 798 | 812 | 910 |
| Fine Gael | Denis Foley | 7.17% | 503 | 595 | 626 | 634 | |
| Independent | David O'Brien | 3.58% | 251 | 264 | | | |
| Fianna Fáil | Philip Gahan | 3.57% | 250 | 275 | | | |
Electorate: 13,175 Valid: 7,011 Spoilt: 133 Quota: 1,169 Turnout: 7,144 (54.22%)

=== Tullow ===
Tullow: 6 Seats
| Party | Candidate | FPv% | Count | | | | | | | |
| Party | Candidate | FPv% | 1 | 2 | 3 | 4 | 5 | 6 | 7 | 8 |
|---|---|---|---|---|---|---|---|---|---|---|
| Fianna Fáil | John Pender | 20.01% | 1,446 | | | | | | | |
| Independent | Charlie Murphy | 19.32% | 1,396 | | | | | | | |
| Fine Gael | Brian O'Donoghue | 11.87% | 858 | 927 | 942 | 955 | 1,050 | | | |
| Labour | William Paton | 10.82% | 782 | 878 | 904 | 933 | 1,046 | | | |
| Fine Gael | John Murphy | 9.65% | 697 | 740 | 839 | 891 | 1,006 | 1,018 | 1,163 | |
| Fianna Fáil | John McDonald | 5.95% | 430 | 547 | 610 | 628 | 657 | 660 | 782 | 833 |
| Sinn Féin | Jim Deane | 7.76% | 561 | 588 | 610 | 639 | 673 | 674 | 783 | 795 |
| Independent | Billy Nolan | 5.52% | 399 | 417 | 500 | 573 | 596 | 597 | | |
| Fine Gael | Maria Ansbro | 5.11% | 369 | 400 | 414 | 457 | | | | |
| Renua | Helena Byrne | 3.99% | 288 | 300 | 341 | | | | | |
Electorate: 14,840 Valid: 7,226 Spoilt: 86 Quota: 1,033 Turnout: 7,312 (49.27%)

== Results by gender ==
2019 Carlow County Council election Candidates by gender
| Gender | Number of candidates | % of candidates | Elected councillors | % of councillors |
|---|---|---|---|---|
| Men | 26 | 83.9% | 16 | 88.9% |
| Women | 5 | 16.1% | 2 | 11.1% |
| TOTAL | 31 | | 18 | |

== Changes after 2019 ==
=== Changes in affiliation ===
| Name | LEA | Elected as | New affiliation | Date |
|---|---|---|---|---|
| William Paton | Tullow | Labour | Independent | February 2024 |
| John Cassin | Carlow | Independent | Independent Ireland | May 2024 |
