= 2024 Carlow County Council election =

Part of the 2024 Irish local elections

- 7 June 2024

All 18 seats on Carlow County Council 10 seats needed for a majority
- Turnout: 47.5% ▼1.9%
	First party	Second party	Third party
Party	Fine Gael	Fianna Fáil	Sinn Féin
Last election	6	6	1
Seats before	6	6	1
Seats won	6	5	2
Seat change	Steady	▼1	▲1
	Fourth party	Fifth party	Sixth party
Party	Labour	People Before Profit	Independent Ireland
Last election	2	1	0
Seats before	1	1	1
Seats won	1	1	1
Seat change	Steady	Steady	Steady
	Seventh party
Party	Independent
Last election	2
Seats before	2
Seats won	2
Seat change	Steady
- Area of Carlow County Council

An election to all 18 seats on Carlow County Council was held on 7 June 2024 as part of the 2024 Irish local elections. County Carlow is divided into 3 local electoral areas (LEAs) to elect councillors for a five-year term of office on the electoral system of proportional representation by means of the single transferable vote (PR-STV).

== Results by party ==
Party	First-preference votes			Seats				
Party	Votes	% FPv	Swing (pp)	Cand.	2019	Out.	Elected 2024	Change
Fine Gael	6,340	27.84	▼3.51	8	6	6	6	Steady
Fianna Fáil	6,791	29.82	▼3.73	7	6	6	5	▼1
Sinn Féin	2,732	12.00	▲3.59	8	1	1	2	▲1
Labour	1,090	4.79	▼4.06	1	2	1	1	▼1
People Before Profit	596	2.62	▲0.55	2	1	1	1	Steady
Independent Ireland	590	2.59	New	1	New	1	1	▲1
Green	535	2.35	New	2	New	0	0	Steady
National Party	303	1.33	New	2	New	0	0	Steady
The Irish People	171	0.75	New	1	New	0	0	Steady
Ireland First	141	0.62	New	1	New	0	0	Steady
Irish Freedom	132	0.58	New	1	New	0	0	Steady
Independent	3,354	14.73	▲1.73	7	2	2	2	Steady
Total Valid	22,875	98.58						
Spoilt votes	329	1.43						
Total	23,204	100.00	—	41	18	18	18	Steady
Registered voters/Turnout	48,895	47.76						

== Results by LEA ==
*: Outgoing councillor elected in 2019.
†: Outgoing councillor coopted subsequent to the 2019 election.

=== Carlow ===
Carlow: 7 seats
Party	Candidate	FPv%	Count													
Party	Candidate	FPv%	1	2	3	4	5	6	7	8	9	10	11	12	13	14
Fianna Fáil	Fintan Phelan	21.01%	1,678													
Fianna Fáil	Andrea Dalton	14.39%	1,149													
Fine Gael	Fergal Browne	11.18%	893	1,047												
Independent Ireland	John Cassin	7.39%	590	637	649	655	656	668	690	698	734	752	773	813	968	1,058
Fianna Fáil	Ken Murnane	7.04%	562	696	733	743	744	749	756	762	769	783	791	813	828	931
Fine Gael	Paul Doogue	5.32%	425	522	548	560	563	567	569	577	582	636	649	687	704	906
People Before Profit	Adrienne Wallace	5.23%	418	449	460	463	507	510	519	530	537	597	639	719	731	770
Fine Gael	Tom O'Neill	4.98%	398	492	521	528	528	530	533	539	547	582	591	618	625	
Sinn Féin	Mark Callinan	4.36%	348	364	368	369	372	374	374	438	443	458	618	643	657	684
Green	Molly Aylesbury	3.01%	240	261	270	273	276	277	277	282	283					
Sinn Féin	Nicoleta Chiorean	2.98%	238	250	253	254	256	258	263	314	315	329				
Independent	Jolly O'Rock	2.20%	176	202	211	214	269	272	279	288	295	335	355			
The Irish People	Rory Woods	2.14%	171	175	176	176	176	189	265	271	365	368	371	381		
National Party	Daeln Murphy	1.97%	157	160	160	160	160	197	224	224						
Sinn Féin	Ruairí Doyle	1.95%	156	177	180	181	181	185	188							
Ireland First	Maria Ryan	1.77%	141	147	148	148	150	181								
Irish Freedom	Orla Donohoe	1.65%	132	137	139	140	140									
Independent	Adetula Temiola	1.42%	113	121	124	124										
Electorate: 18,629 Valid: 7,985 Spoilt: 120 Quota: 999 Turnout: 8,105 (43.51%)

=== Muinebheag ===
Muinebheag: 5 seats
Party	Candidate	FPv%	Count			
Party	Candidate	FPv%	1	2	3	4
Fine Gael	Thomas Kinsella	24.42%	1,732			
Labour	Willie Quinn	15.37%	1,090	1,295		
Sinn Féin	Andy Gladney	14.35%	1,018	1,054	1,071	1,292
Fianna Fáil	Daniel Pender	13.90%	986	1,070	1,112	1,228
Fine Gael	Michael Doran	13.29%	943	1,083	1,108	1,184
Fianna Fáil	Arthur McDonald	11.55%	819	875	898	938
Green	Liam O'Brien	4.16%	295	315	318	
Sinn Féin	Áine Gladney	2.96%	210	218	220	
Electorate: 14,099 Valid: 7,093 Spoilt: 138 Quota: 1,183 Turnout: 7,231 (51.29%)

=== Tullow ===
Tullow: 6 seats
Party	Candidate	FPv%	Count												
Party	Candidate	FPv%	1	2	3	4	5	6	7	8	9	10	11	12	13
Fianna Fáil	John Pender	17.12%	1,335												
Independent	Charlie Murphy	16.49%	1,286												
Independent	William Paton	13.04%	1,017	1,052	1,066	1,073	1,103	1,135							
Fine Gael	Ben Ward	9.03%	704	739	761	764	771	795	837	854	859	888	1,009	1,177	
Fine Gael	Brian O'Donoghue	8.09%	631	664	670	671	676	683	691	727	729	796	851	874	895
Fine Gael	Catherine Callaghan	7.87%	614	628	684	690	692	709	709	714	717	745	780	864	892
Sinn Féin	Jim Deane	5.37%	419	428	433	453	457	488	504	688	692	735	791	879	893
Fianna Fáil	John McDonald	4.64%	362	410	431	432	432	439	450	456	456	478			
Independent	Billy Nolan	4.14%	323	330	362	363	379	390	407	414	416	506	588		
Independent	Annette McDonnell	3.26%	254	270	274	282	299	319	380	400	405				
Sinn Féin	Ken Gahan	2.80%	218	224	225	294	296	313	336						
Independent	Patricia Fennelly Nolan	2.37%	185	191	194	198	219	231							
People Before Profit	John Cahill	2.28%	178	184	188	192	202								
National Party	Daeln Murphy	1.87%	146	148	150	151									
Sinn Féin	Phil Thompson	1.60%	125	129	131										
Electorate: 16,167 Valid: 7,797 Spoilt: 71 Quota: 1,114 Turnout: 7,868 (48.67%)
