= Patrick McKee =

Irish politician

Kilkenny County Councillor
- In office 23 May 2014 – 24 May 2019
- Constituency: Kilkenny City West

Personal details
- Party: Fianna Fáil (until 2015, since 2018)
- Other political affiliations: Renua (2015–2016); Independent (2016–2018)
- Education: University College Cork

Patrick McKee is a lawyer and former politician. He is a member of Fianna Fáil, and was formerly a member of Renua and was their candidate in the 2015 Carlow-Kilkenny Dáil by-election.

== Background ==
McKee was born in June 1988. He attended secondary school at St Kieran's College until 2006, going on to graduate with a Bachelor of Arts in Law and Business from Waterford Institute of Technology in 2010. In 2011 he received a Bachelor of Laws degree from University College Cork. McKee works as a solicitor with Turner Solicitors, in Dublin. McKee publicly came out as a gay man in 2011 during an interview on local radio.

== Political career ==
In 2006, McKee joined Ógra Fianna Fáil, the youth wing of Fianna Fáil, and established the Thomas Francis Meagher Cumann during his time in WIT. During his time in Waterford he worked closely with former Minister for Transport Martin Cullen TD. McKee held positions both locally and nationally in Ógra Fianna Fáil. He was elected Leinster representative on Ógra Fianna Fáil's National Youth Committee in 2011. During 2010 McKee worked as an intern in Seanad Éireann for Senator Mark Daly.

In 2013 he declared his candidacy for Kilkenny County Council in the forthcoming elections and in May 2014 was elected in the local electoral area of Kilkenny City for Fianna Fáil. He was elected chairman of the Joint Policing Committee and leas-cathaoirleach of the council. In March 2015 McKee left Fianna Fáil amid rumors of homophobic bullying and joined the newly formed Renua party. His departure prompted criticism from a number of high-profile Fianna Fáil colleagues, including Michael McGrath and Timmy Dooley. He later stated that before joining Renua, he had considered joining Sinn Féin.

McKee was the Renua candidate for the Carlow–Kilkenny constituency at both the 2015 by-election and the 2016 general election. He won 9.5% and 3.6% of the first-preference votes on each occasion.

In December 2016, McKee left Renua Ireland and rejoined Fianna Fail. He returned to Fianna Fáil in 2017, which was met with criticism from some members of the party and prompted comment from Micheál Martin and a number of board members of the party to resign.

In February 2018, he garnered criticism over comments he made about Ruth Coppinger on Twitter for which later apologised. In November 2018, McKee announced that he would not be standing for re-election, instead deciding to focus on the development of his legal career.
