= 2015 Carlow–Kilkenny by-election =

By-election to the 31st Dáil

- 22 May 2015
- Turnout: 68,900 (65.3%)
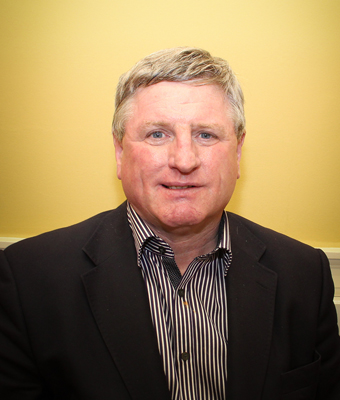

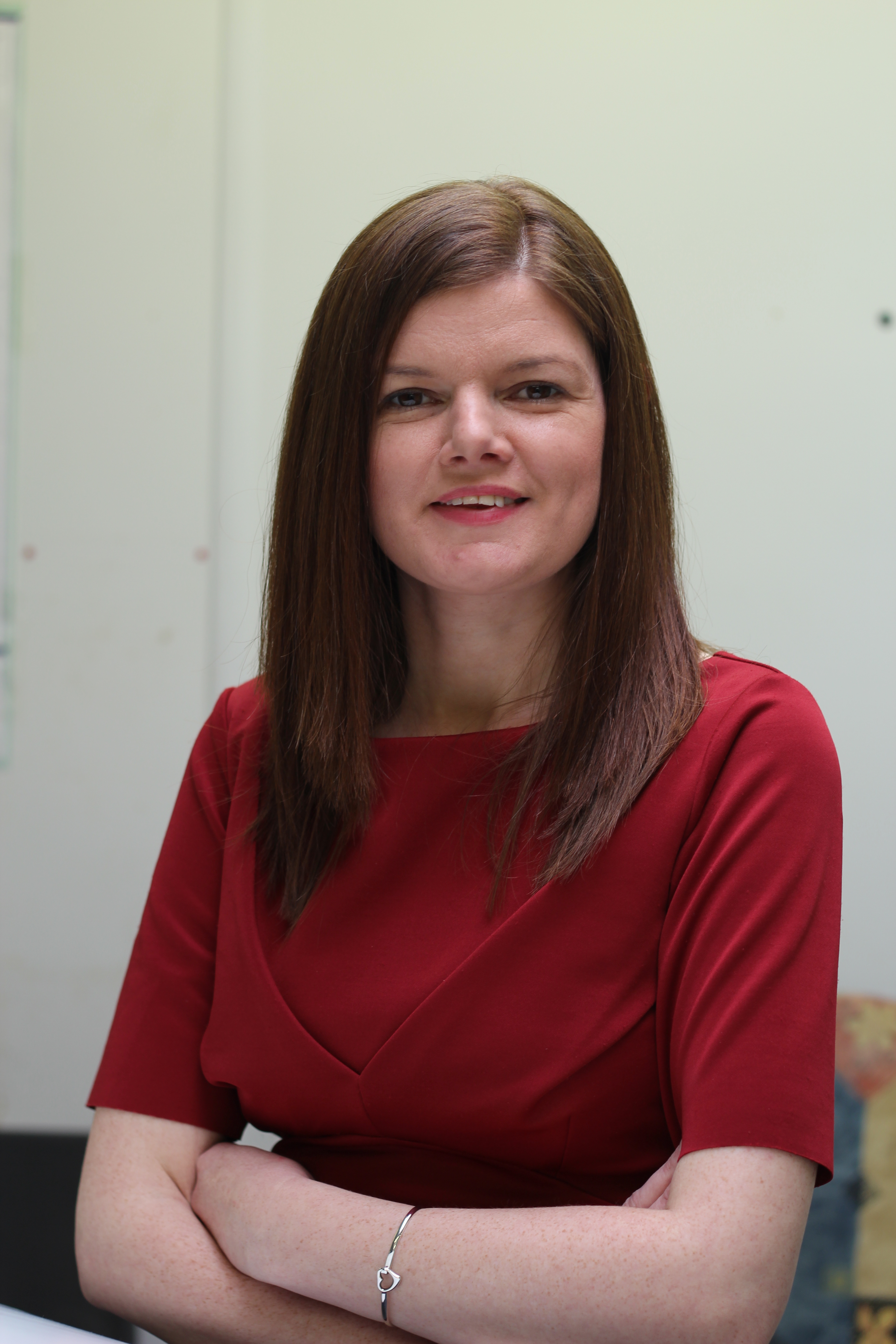
		Fitzgerald
Nominee	Bobby Aylward	David Fitzgerald	Kathleen Funchion
Party	Fianna Fáil	Fine Gael	Sinn Féin
First preferences	18,572	13,744	10,806
Percentage	27.8%	20.6%	16.2%
Final count	26,529	21,632	–
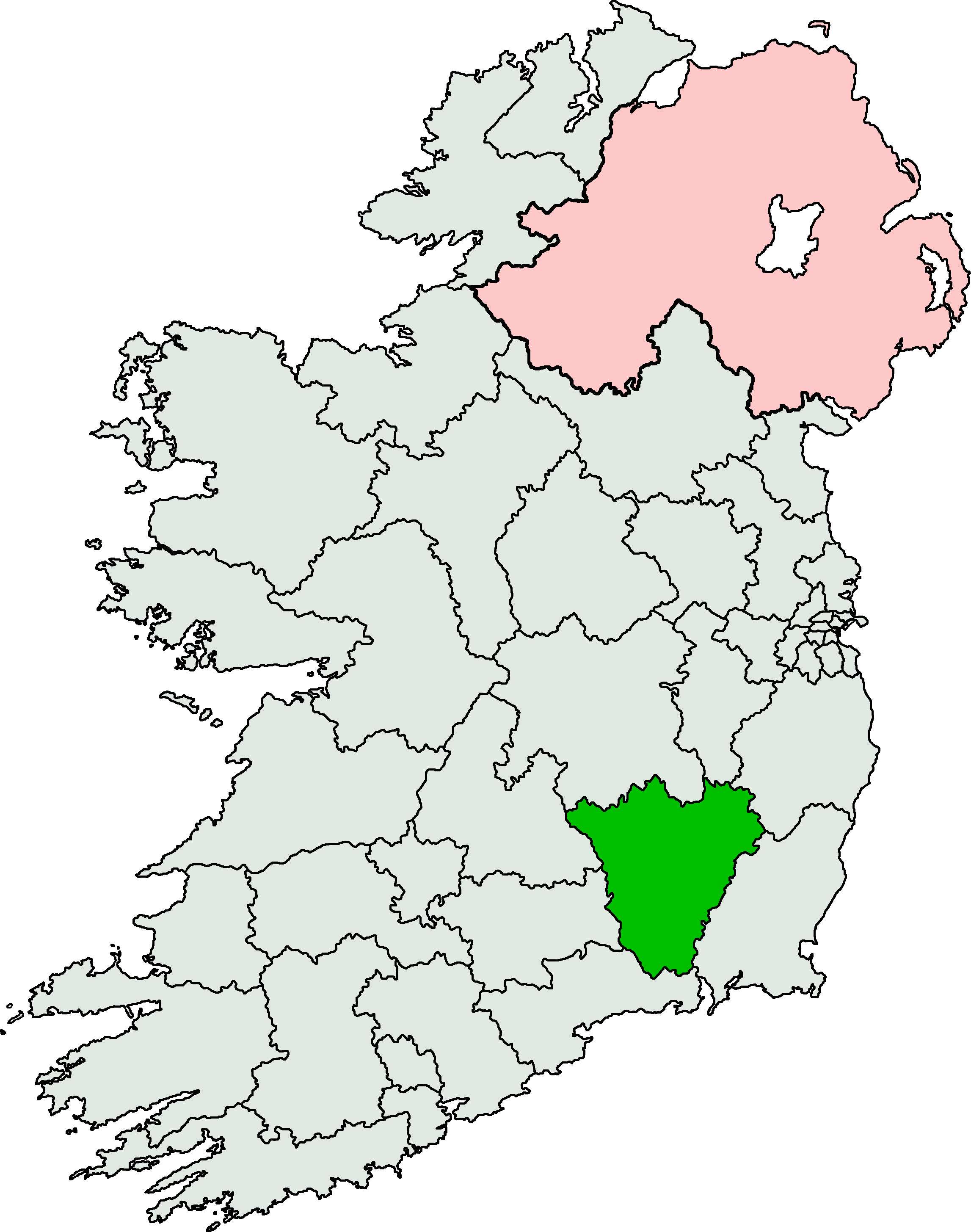
- Carlow–Kilkenny shown within Ireland
TD before election
Phil Hogan
Fine Gael
TD after election
Bobby Aylward
Fianna Fáil

A Dáil by-election was held in the constituency of Carlow–Kilkenny in Ireland on Friday, 22 May 2015, to fill a vacancy in the 31st Dáil. It followed the resignation of Fine Gael Teachta Dála (TD) Phil Hogan on his appointment as European Commissioner. It was held on the same day as national referendums on marriage equality and the age of eligibility for election to the office of president.

The Electoral (Amendment) Act 2011 stipulates that a by-election in Ireland must be held within six months of a vacancy occurring. The Writ of election was moved in the Dáil on 29 April 2015.

At the 2011 general election, the constituency elected three Fine Gael TDs, one Labour Party TD and one Fianna Fáil TD. In the May 2014 local elections, Carlow County Council elected six Fine Gael, five Fianna Fáil, three Sinn Féin, two Labour and two independent councillors, while Kilkenny County Council elected ten Fianna Fáil, seven Fine Gael, three Sinn Féin, two Labour, one Green Party and one independent councillor. Patrick McKee, who stood for Renua, had been elected to Kilkenny County Council for Fianna Fáil.

Former TD Bobby Aylward of Fianna Fáil won the by-election on the ninth count, having received 27.8% of the first-preference votes. Aylward had previously represented Carlow–Kilkenny from 2007 until 2011. The result marked the first by-election win for Fianna Fáil since 1996, and the first time they had gained a seat from Fine Gael in a by-election since the Donegal–Leitrim contest in 1970.

== Result ==
2015 Carlow–Kilkenny by-election
Party	Candidate	FPv%	Count								
Party	Candidate	FPv%	1	2	3	4	5	6	7	8	9
Fianna Fáil	Bobby Aylward	27.8	18,572	18,713	18,845	19,223	19,480	19,898	20,950	22,826	26,529
Fine Gael	David Fitzgerald	20.6	13,744	13,826	13,895	14,174	14,289	15,058	16,612	18,875	21,632
Sinn Féin	Kathleen Funchion	16.2	10,806	11,006	11,501	11,974	13,113	13,879	14,632	16,437	
Renua	Patrick McKee	9.5	6,365	6,530	6,736	7,225	7,678	8,532	9,269		
Labour	Willie Quinn	7.0	4,673	4,803	4,853	4,954	5,252	5,775			
Green	Malcolm Noonan	5.3	3,549	3,651	3,836	4,257	4,528				
Independent	Breda Gardner	4.2	2,792	3,016	3,226						
People Before Profit	Adrienne Wallace	3.6	2,377	2,644	3,256	3,640					
Anti-Austerity Alliance	Conor MacLiam	3.3	2,194	2,296							
Independent	Peter O'Loughlin	1.4	930								
Independent	Daithí Holohan	0.6	374								
Independent	Noel Walsh	0.4	243								
Independent	Elizabeth Hourihane	0.3	215								
Electorate: 105,449 Valid: 66,834 Spoilt: 2,066 (3.0%) Quota: 33,418 Turnout: 68,900 (65.3%)
