= County Buildings, Carlow =

Municipal building in County Carlow, Ireland

- Áras an Chontae, Ceatharlach
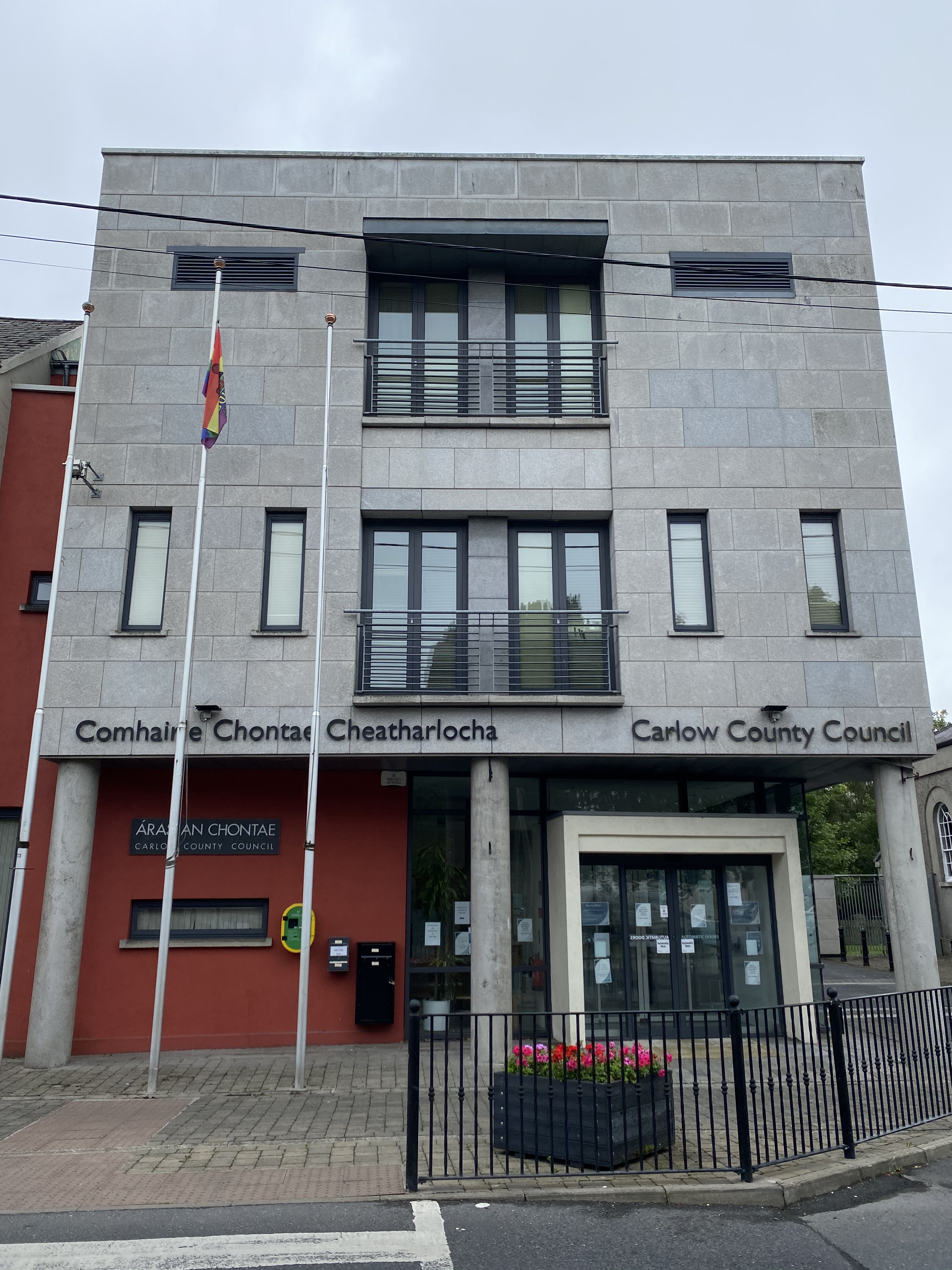
- County Buildings, Carlow

- Location within Ireland

General information
- Location: Carlow, County Carlow, Ireland
- Coordinates: 52.8398°N 6.9313°W

The County Buildings (Irish: Áras an Chontae, Ceatharlach) are a municipal facility in Athy Road, Carlow, County Carlow, Ireland.

== History ==
Originally Carlow Courthouse was the meeting place of Carlow County Council. The county council established their County Secretary's Office at 1 Athy Road in the former offices and printing works of the Carlow Sentinel which ceased publication after the First World War. The county council subsequently moved further north along Athy Road into modern premises which are now known as the County Buildings.
