= 2014 Carlow County Council election =

Part of the 2014 Irish local elections

- 23 May 2014

All 18 seats on Carlow County Council
- Turnout: 52.3% ▼5.5%
	First party	Second party	Third party
Party	Fine Gael	Fianna Fáil	Sinn Féin
Seats won	6	5	3
Seat change	−4	+1	+3
	Fourth party	Fifth party
Party	Labour	Independent
Seats won	2	2
Seat change	−3	-
- Map showing the area of Carlow County Council
Cathaoirleach before election
Des Hurley
Lab
Subsequent Cathaoirleach
Fergal Browne
FG

An election to all 18 seats on Carlow County Council was held on 23 May 2014 as part of the 2014 Irish local elections. County Carlow was divided into two local electoral areas (LEAs) to elect councillors for a five-year term of office on the electoral system of proportional representation by means of the single transferable vote (PR-STV).

== Administrative changes ==
Carlow County Council had been allocated 21 seats under the Local Government Act 2001. In November 2012, Phil Hogan, the Minister for the Environment, Community and Local Government, appointed a Local Electoral Area Boundary Committee to review the allocation of seats and the local electoral areas across local authorities. In the case of Carlow County Council, it recommended a decrease to 18 seats. In addition, the town councils of Carlow and Muinebheag were abolished. This was implemented by the Local Government Reform Act 2014. County Carlow was redrawn into two electoral areas, a reduction from five.

== Analysis ==
While Fine Gael remained the largest party after the election, in terms of seats though not in terms of vote share, they lost two-fifths of their councillors. Their colleagues in government, the Labour Party, lost three-fifths of their councillors being reduced to just 2 seats. Fianna Fáil gained a seat to return 5 members and reported a higher vote than Fine Gael but the big winners were Sinn Féin who won 3 seats to supplant Labour as the traditional third-largest party.

== Results by party ==
Party	Seats	±	1st pref	FPv%	±%
Fine Gael	6	−4	5,808	27.0	
Fianna Fáil	5	+1	6,207	28.9	
Sinn Féin	3	+3	2,723	12.7	
Labour	2	−3	2,830	13.2	
Independent	2	—	3,010	14.0	
Total	18	−3	20,578	100.0	—

== Results by local electoral area ==
*: Outgoing councillor.

=== Carlow ===
Carlow: 10 seats
Party	Candidate	FPv%	Count														
Party	Candidate	FPv%	1	2	3	4	5	6	7	8	9	10	11	12	13	14	15
Fianna Fáil	Jennifer Murnane O'Connor (Note: Resigned, see below for changes)	13.04	1,530														
Fianna Fáil	John Pender	11.54	1,354														
Sinn Féin	John Cassin	9.18	1,077														
Fine Gael	Brian O'Donoghue	8.68	1,018	1,025	1,073												
Fianna Fáil	Fintan Phelan	8.62	1,011	1,128													
Sinn Féin	Jim Deane	7.18	842	878	900	902	908	909	917	940	961	981	1,042	1,174			
Fianna Fáil	Ann Ahern née Long	5.76	676	769	827	852	853	854	858	873	874	916	961	981	987	1,007	1,063
Independent	Walter Lacey	5.39	632	680	689	696	697	697	708	738	793	852	894	971	1,013	1,039	1,116
Labour	William Paton	5.20	610	617	694	695	695	697	699	704	712	738	794	818	828	1,022	1,046
Fine Gael	Fergal Browne	4.64	544	563	575	578	578	578	579	583	610	621	654	662	664	728	912
Fine Gael	Wayne Fennell	3.87	454	468	472	475	475	475	475	479	494	502	529	537	537	552	
Fine Gael	Tom O'Neill	3.52	413	436	439	444	445	445	446	454	461	489	522	532	533	568	686
Fine Gael	Kathy Walsh	3.11	365	369	401	401	401	402	404	409	412	415	429	436	439		
Anti-Austerity Alliance	Ned Costigan	2.47	290	301	306	307	308	309	315	366	385	391	402				
Labour	Caroline Townsend	2.40	281	309	317	323	323	323	325	331	337	391					
Labour	Des Hurley	1.90	223	256	258	260	260	260	265	270	282	282					
Independent	Declan Alcock	1.64	192	202	206	209	209	209	216	224							
Direct Democracy	Saoire O'Brien	1.41	166	173	175	177	177	177	182								
Independent	Pat Finnerty	0.27	32	33	33	33	33	33	33								
Independent	Conor Dowling	0.19	22	27	28	29	29	29	29								
Electorate: 23,431 Valid: 11,732 (50.07%) Spoilt: 139 Quota: 1,067 Turnout: 11,871 (50.66%)

=== Muinebheag ===
Muinebheag: 8 seats
Party	Candidate	FPv%	Count											
Party	Candidate	FPv%	1	2	3	4	5	6	7	8	9	10	11	12
Independent	Charlie Murphy	14.14	1,377											
Fine Gael	Tommy Kinsella	11.60	1,130											
Labour	Willie Quinn	10.66	1,038	1,066	1,083									
Sinn Féin	Andy Gladney	8.26	804	825	827	840	858	885	926	974	1,176			
Fianna Fáil	Arthur McDonald	8.09	788	803	806	809	851	863	1,018	1,032	1,081	1,099		
Fine Gael	Michael Doran	7.90	769	775	777	790	805	814	838	882	939	949	950	1,107
Fine Gael	John Murphy	5.79	564	610	619	630	634	683	686	751	756	760	760	827
Fine Gael	Denis Foley	5.66	551	564	570	578	620	629	664	683	727	747	752	824
Fianna Fáil	P.J. Kavanagh	5.05	492	536	538	566	567	598	634	668	701	711	712	777
Labour	Jim Townsend	4.73	461	474	475	486	516	554	586	639	678	698	701	
Anti-Austerity Alliance	Christy Cormac	4.49	437	447	448	459	481	492	523	586				
Fianna Fáil	David O'Brien	3.66	356	367	368	376	399	407						
Independent	Matthew English-Hayden	3.42	333	356	357	390	395							
Independent	Billy Nolan	2.68	261	303	304	322	324	324						
Labour	Ken Hickey	2.23	217	220	220	222								
Independent	Liam Foley	1.37	133	150	151									
Independent	Pat Finnerty	0.29	28	30	30									
Electorate: 17,599 Valid: 9,739 (55.46%) Spoilt: 139 Quota: 1,083 Turnout: 9,878 (56.26%)

== Changes ==
=== Co-options ===
Party	Outgoing	LEA	Reason	Date	Co-optee
Fianna Fáil	Jennifer Murnane-O'Connor	Carlow	Elected to 25th Seanad in April 2016	9 June 2016	Ken Murnane
Fianna Fáil	Anne Ahern	Carlow	Appointed school principal	9 October 2017	Andrea Dalton

=== Changes in affiliation ===
Name	LEA	Elected as	New affiliation	Date
John Cassin	Carlow	Sinn Féin	Independent	February 2019

== Local electoral areas ==
Carlow County Council was divided into the two local electoral areas (LEAs), defined by electoral divisions.

LEA	Electoral divisions	Seats
Carlow	Ballinacarrig, Burton Hall, Carlow Rural, Carlow Urban, Graigue Urban and Johnstown.	10
Muinebeag	Agha, Ballintemple, Ballon, Ballyellin, Ballymoon, Ballymurphy, Borris, Clogrenan, Clonegall, Coonogue, Corries, Cranemore, Fennagh, Garryhill, Glynn, Kilbride, Killedmond, Kyle, Leighlinbridge, Marley, Muinebeag (Bagenalstown) Rural, Muinebeag (Bagenalstown) Urban, Myshall, Nurney, Oldleighlin, Rathanna, Rathornan, Rathrush, Ridge, Shangarry, Sliguff, Templepeter, Tinnahinch	8
