= Carlow Courthouse =

- Teach Cúirte Cheatharlach
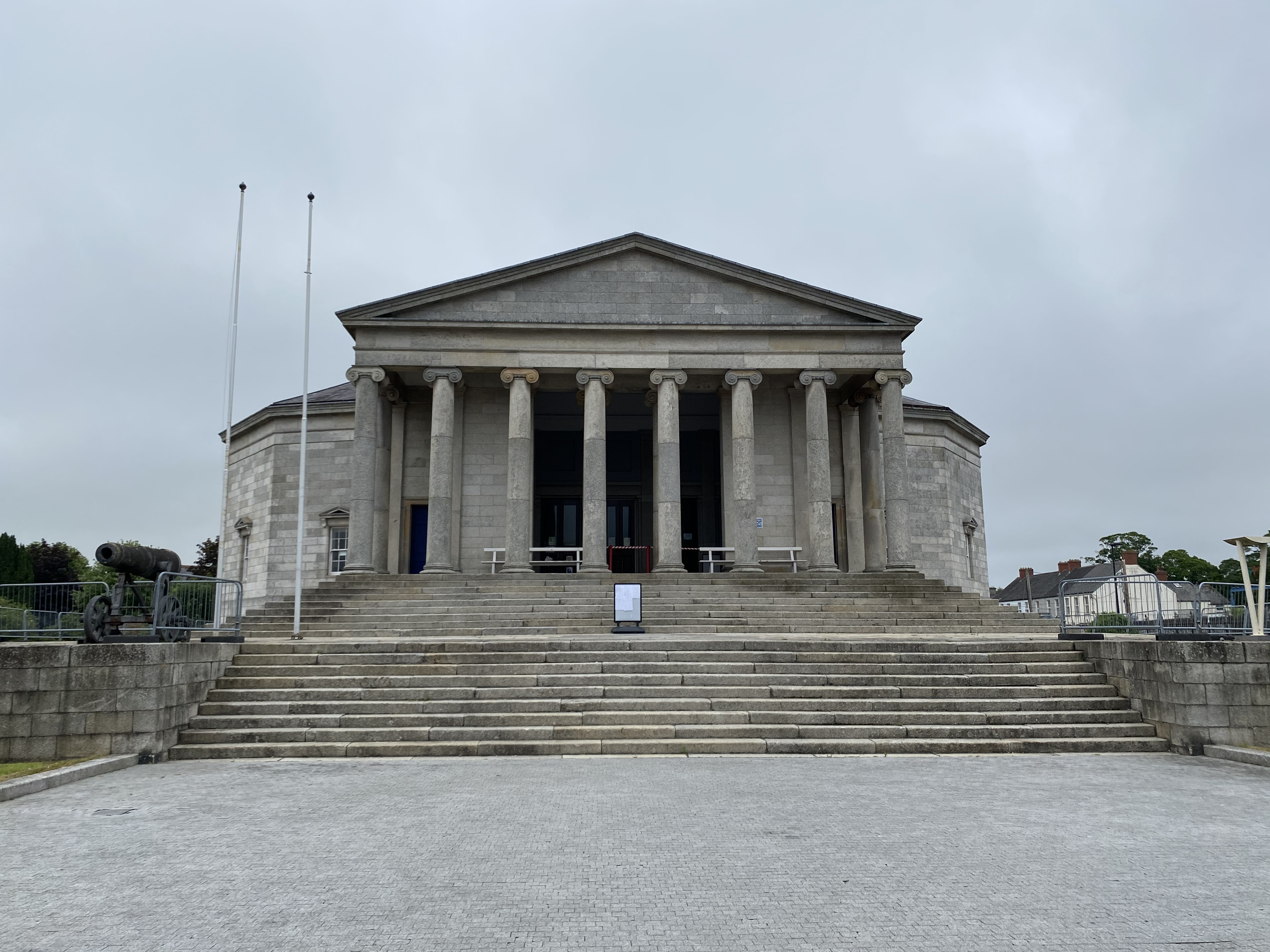
- Carlow Courthouse

- Location within Ireland

General information
- Architectural style: Neoclassical style
- Location: Carlow, Ireland
- Coordinates: 52.8391°N 6.9301°W
- Completed: 1834

Design and construction
- Architect: William Vitruvius Morrison

Carlow Courthouse is a judicial facility in Dublin Road, Carlow, County Carlow, Ireland.

== History ==
The courthouse, which was designed by William Vitruvius Morrison in the neoclassical style and built in ashlar stone, was completed in 1834. The design involved a symmetrical main frontage facing the corner of Athy Road and Old Dublin Road; there was a flight of steps leading up to a large octastyle portico with Ionic order columns supporting an entablature and a pediment: it was modelled on the Temple on the Ilissus in Athens. A Russian artillery piece, which had been used in the Crimean War, was brought back to Ireland and placed on the steps of the building in 1858.

The building was originally used as a facility for dispensing justice but, following the implementation of the Local Government (Ireland) Act 1898, which established county councils in every county, it also became the meeting place for Carlow County Council. The county council established their County Secretary's Office on the west side of Athy Road in the mid-20th century before moving further north along the road into modern premises which are now known as the County Buildings. The courthouse was refurbished in 2002 and continues to be used as a judicial facility.
