= 2004 Carlow County Council election =

- 11 June 2004

All 21 seats on Carlow County Council
	First party	Second party	Third party
Party	Fianna Fáil	Fine Gael	Labour
Seats won	8	7	4
Seat change	-1	-	+1
	Fourth party	Fifth party
Party	Green	Progressive Democrats
Seats won	1	1
Seat change	-	-
- Map showing the area of Carlow County Council
Council control after election
TBD

An election to Carlow County Council took place on 11 June 2004 as part of that year's Irish local elections. 21 councillors were elected from five electoral divisions by PR-STV voting for a five-year term of office.

== Results by party ==
Party	Seats	±	First Pref. votes	FPv%	±%
Fianna Fáil	8	-1	7,844	36.32	
Fine Gael	7	-	7,107	32.91	
Labour	4	+1	3,713	17.19	
Green	1	-	1,482	6.86	
Progressive Democrats	1	-	730	3.38	
Totals	21	-	21,596	100.00	—

== Results by local electoral area ==
=== Borris ===
Borris - 3 seats
Party	Candidate	FPv%	Count			
Party	Candidate	FPv%	1	2	3	4
Labour	Michael Meaney*	33.13	1,002			
Fine Gael	Tommy Kinsella	23.41	708	798		
Green	Mary White*	20.17	610	680	693	827
Fianna Fáil	Teddy Holden	11.84	358	412	426	608
Fianna Fáil	Peter O'Rourke	11.44	346	377	391	
Electorate: 5,179 Valid: 3,024 (58.39%) Spoilt: 58 Quota: 757 Turnout: 3,082 (59.51%)

=== Carlow No.1 ===
Carlow No.1 - 3 seats
Party	Candidate	FPv%	Count			
Party	Candidate	FPv%	1	2	3	4
Fianna Fáil	Jennifer Murnane-O'Connor*	30.23	843			
Fianna Fáil	Joe McDonald*	19.47	543	609	655	741
Fine Gael	Declan Alcock*	15.13	422	449	485	613
Fine Gael	Colette Fennelly	14.95	417	431	457	562
Labour	Jimmy Brennan	12.44	347	374	450	
Green	Matt Diskin	7.78	217	228		
Electorate: 5,777 Valid: 2,789 (48.28%) Spoilt: 44 Quota: 698 Turnout: 2,857 (49.45%)

=== Carlow No.2 ===
Carlow No.2 - 5 seats
Party	Candidate	FPv%	Count									
Party	Candidate	FPv%	1	2	3	4	5	6	7	8	9	10
Fine Gael	Michael Abbey*	22.94	1,094									
Fianna Fáil	Rody Kelly*	17.38	853									
Progressive Democrats	Walter Lacey*	14.87	730	788	797	814	852					
Labour	Des Hurley	11.14	547	576	579	601	630	679	726	874		
Fianna Fáil	Lorraine Hynes*	7.76	381	404	414	421	486	519	553	597	614	631
Green	Geraldine Callinan-O'Dea	6.21	305	320	321	336	349	412	432			
Fine Gael	Wayne Fennell*	5.79	284	333	334	338	345	365	512	577	615	619
Fine Gael	Gerry Dunne	4.36	214	278	279	284	294	310				
Fianna Fáil	Annie Parker-Byrne	3.95	194	208	214	226						
Independent	Thompson Akinwunmi-Streets	3.83	188	204	206	230	244					
Independent	Conor Dowling	2.42	119	126	127							
Electorate: 10,135 Valid: 4,909 (48.44%) Spoilt: 126 Quota: 819 Turnout: 5,035 (49.68%)

=== Muinebheag ===
Muinebheag - 5 seats
Party	Candidate	FPv%	Count							
Party	Candidate	FPv%	1	2	3	4	5	6	7	8
Labour	Jim Townsend*	18.29	965							
Fine Gael	Denis Foley	18.10	955							
Fianna Fáil	Arthur McDonald*	12.66	668	675	691	710	721	766	820	931
Fianna Fáil	Enda Nolan*	12.05	636	656	691	697	719	776	803	890
Fine Gael	Michael Drea	8.38	442	447	461	480	503	533	611	654
Fianna Fáil	Eddie Cullen	7.77	410	416	431	436	456	521	541	
Fine Gael	Michael Doran	7.62	402	408	413	425	463	531	579	760
Fianna Fáil	Martin Nevin	5.31	280	285	291	295	306			
Labour	Liam O'Brien	4.02	212	238	238	245	312	323		
Green	John James Tully	3.92	207	212	213	216				
Fianna Fáil	Pat Abbey	1.88	99	104						
Electorate: 9,184 Valid: 5,276 (57.45%) Spoilt: 99 Quota: 880 Turnout: 5,375 (58.53%)

=== Tullow ===
Tullow - 5 seats
Party	Candidate	FPv%	Count									
Party	Candidate	FPv%	1	2	3	4	5	6	7	8	9	10
Fianna Fáil	P.J. Kavanagh*	15.47	866	866	875	909	929	932	977			
Fianna Fáil	John Pender*	15.40	862	866	872	893	735	825				
Fine Gael	Fred Hunter*	12.20	683	689	705	717	763	766	841	1,023		
Fine Gael	Michael Deering*	11.09	621	635	650	667	688	691	740	859	910	920
Fine Gael	Pat O'Toole	9.63	539	540	553	562	585	587	695	718	727	733
Fianna Fáil	Noel Kennedy	9.02	505	525	531	536	565	567	574			
Labour	William Paton*	7.54	422	423	445	527	591	593	651	702	731	741
Sinn Féin	Declan Sheeran	5.95	333	341	352	363						
Fine Gael	John O'Donovan	5.82	326	326	344	378	392	393				
Labour	Billy Nolan	3.89	218	220	242							
Green	Patricia Carolan	2.55	143	152								
Independent	Bill Leonard	1.43	80									
Electorate: 9,693 Valid: 5,598 (57.75%) Spoilt: 72 Quota: 934 Turnout: 5,688 (58.68%)
