= Bob Aylward =

Irish politician (1911–1974)

Senator
- In office 1 June 1973 – 18 July 1974
- Constituency: Agricultural Panel

Personal details
- Born: Robert Aylward; 2 February 1911 Mullinavat , County Kilkenny, Ireland
- Died: 18 July 1974 (aged 63) Waterford, Ireland
- Party: Fianna Fáil
- Children: Liam; Bobby

Robert Aylward (2 February 1911 – 18 July 1974) was an Irish Fianna Fáil politician who served as a Senator for the Agricultural Panel from 1973 to 1974.

He stood unsuccessfully as a Fianna Fáil candidate for Dáil Éireann in the Carlow–Kilkenny constituency at three successive general elections in 1965, 1969 and 1973. After his 1973 defeat, he was elected to the 13th Seanad as a senator for the Agricultural Panel, and died in office the following year.

His son Liam is a former Fianna Fáil MEP and TD, and another son Bobby was also a TD.

== See also ==
- Families in the Oireachtas
