= Carlow County Council =

Local authority for County Carlow, Ireland

Carlow County Council Comhairle Chontae Cheatharlach

Type
- Type: County council

History
- Founded: 1 April 1899

Leadership
- Cathaoirleach: Thomas Kinsella, FG

Structure
- Seats: 18
- Political groups: Fine Gael (6) Fianna Fáil (5) Sinn Féin (2) Independent Ireland (1) Labour (1) PBP–Solidarity (1) Independent (2)

Elections
- Last election: 7 June 2024

Meeting place
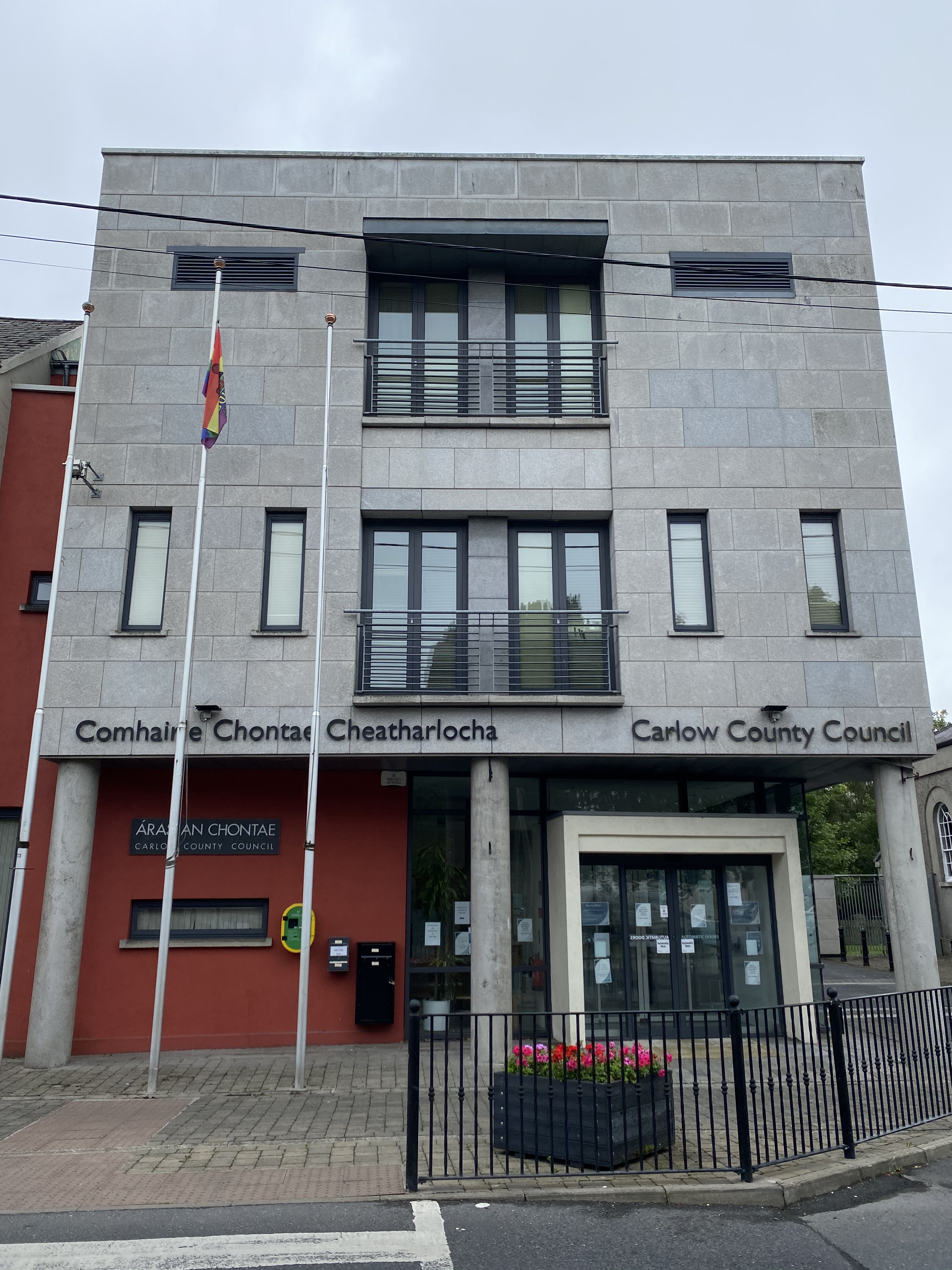
- County Buildings, Athy Road, Carlow

Website
- Official website

The area governed by the council

Carlow County Council (Irish: Comhairle Chontae Cheatharlach) is the local authority of County Carlow, Ireland. As a county council, it is governed by the Local Government Act 2001. The council is responsible for housing and community, roads and transportation, urban planning and development, amenity and culture, and environment. The council has 18 elected members. The head of the council has the title of Cathaoirleach (chairperson). The county administration is headed by a chief executive, Coilín O'Reilly. The county town is Carlow.

== History ==
Carlow County Council was established on 1 April 1899 under the Local Government (Ireland) Act 1898 for the administrative county of County Carlow. That included the judicial county of Carlow and the part of County Laois (then called Queen's County) containing the town of Carlow.

Before 1925, the chair of each rural district council sat as an ex officio member of the council. Under the Local Government Act 1925, rural district councils in Ireland were abolished and their functions transferred to the county councils. In County Carlow, these were the districts of Baltinglass No. 2, Carlow and Idrone.

Under the Local Government Reform Act 2014, all town councils in Ireland were abolished and their functions transferred to the county councils. In County Carlow, these were the town councils of Carlow and Muinebheag. It also provided that the county be divided into municipal districts to administer council business at a local level.

The council originally met in Carlow Courthouse. The council established their County Secretary's Office at 1 Athy Road in the former offices and printing works of the Carlow Sentinel which ceased publication after the First World War. The council subsequently moved further north along Athy Road into modern premises which are now known as the County Buildings.

== Library service ==
Carlow County Library Service has four branches, based in Carlow, Tullow, Bagenalstown and Borris.

The Carlow County Library Service was founded in March 1929 by the Library Association of Ireland with some financial assistance from the Carnegie United Kingdom Trust. It commenced operation in 1930 accommodated in two rooms with one being the Courthouse. It moved to 30 Dublin Street in 1944 and then to the Assembly Rooms in Dublin Street in 1976. In 1998, Carlow County Library Headquarters and Central Library opened in Presentation Building on Tullow Street, the site of the former Presentation Convent. It shares a building with the Carlow County Museum.

== Regional Assembly ==
Carlow County Council has two representatives on the Southern Regional Assembly who are part of the South-East Strategic Planning Area Committee.

== Elections ==
The Local Government (Ireland) Act 1919 introduced the electoral system of proportional representation by means of the single transferable vote (PR-STV) for the 1920 local elections. County Carlow was divided into 4 county electoral areas to elect the 20 members of the council. Following the changes under the Local Government Act 1925, this number was increased to 26. In 1942, in an order under the Local Government Act 1941, the number of councillors was reduced to 21. This figure was restated by the Local Government Act 2001. In 2013, a Local Electoral Area Boundary Committee recommended a reduction in the number of seats to 18. This was implemented by the Local Government Reform Act 2014.

Year	FF	FG	Lab	SF	PBP	GP	II	PDs	Ind.	Total
2024	5	6	1	2	1	0	1	—N/a	2	18
2019	6	6	2	1	1	0	—N/a	—N/a	2	18
2014	6	5	2	3	0	0	—N/a	—N/a	2	18
2009	4	10	5	0	—N/a	0	—N/a	—N/a	2	21
2004	8	7	4	0	—N/a	1	—N/a	1	0	21
1999	9	7	3	0	—N/a	0	—N/a	0	0	21
1991	9	7	4	0	—N/a	0	—N/a	1	0	21
1985	10	7	3	0	—N/a	0	—N/a	—N/a	1	21
1979	8	9	3	0	—N/a	—N/a	—N/a	—N/a	1	21

== Local electoral areas and municipal districts ==
County Carlow is divided into three local electoral areas (LEAs), defined by electoral divisions, each of which also forms a municipal district.

LEA and Municipal District	Electoral divisions	Seats
Carlow	Ballinacarrig, Burton Hall, Carlow Rural, Carlow Urban, Graigue Urban and Johnstown.	7
Muine Bheag	Agha, Ballyellin, Ballymoon, Ballymurphy, Borris, Clogrenan, Coonogue, Corries, Fennagh, Garryhill, Glynn, Killedmond, Kyle, Leighlinbridge, Marley, Muinebeag Rural, Muinebeag Urban, Nurney, Oldleighlin, Rathanna, Rathornan, Ridge, Sliguff and Tinnahinch.	5
Tullow	Ballintemple, Ballon, Clonegall, Clonmore, Cranemore, Grangeford, Hacketstown, Haroldstown, Kellistown, Kilbride, Killerrig, Kineagh, Myshall, Rahill, Rathrush, Rathvilly, Shangarry, Tankardstown, Templepeter, Tiknock, Tullow Rural, Tullow Urban, Tullowbeg and Williamstown.	6

== Councillors ==
The following were elected at the 2024 Carlow County Council election.

Party	Seats
Fine Gael	6
Fianna Fáil	5
Sinn Féin	2
Independent Ireland	1
Labour	1
PBP–Solidarity	1
Independent	2

=== Councillors by electoral area ===
This list reflects the order in which councillors were elected on 7 June 2024.

Council members from 2024 election
Local electoral area	Name	Party
Carlow	Fintan Phelan	Fianna Fáil
Carlow	Andrea Dalton	Fianna Fáil
Carlow	Fergal Browne	Fine Gael
Carlow	John Cassin	Independent Ireland
Carlow	Ken Murnane	Fianna Fáil
Carlow	Paul Doogue	Fine Gael
Carlow	Adrienne Wallace	PBP–Solidarity
Muine Bheag	Thomas Kinsella	Fine Gael
Muine Bheag	Willie Quinn	Labour
Muine Bheag	Andy Gladney	Sinn Féin
Muine Bheag	Daniel Pender	Fianna Fáil
Muine Bheag	Michael Doran	Fine Gael
Tullow	John Pender	Fianna Fáil
Tullow	Charlie Murphy	Independent
Tullow	William Paton	Independent
Tullow	Ben Ward	Fine Gael
Tullow	Brian O'Donoghue	Fine Gael
Tullow	Jim Deane	Sinn Féin
