= Fergal Browne =

Irish politician (born 1973)

Cllr Fergal Browne

Carlow County Councillor
- Incumbent
- Assumed office June 2009
- Constituency: Carlow

Senator
- In office 12 September 2002 – 13 September 2007
- Constituency: Labour Panel

Personal details
- Born: 11 September 1973 (age 52) County Carlow, Ireland
- Party: Fine Gael
- Parent: John Browne (father)

Fergal Browne (born 11 September 1973) is an Irish Fine Gael politician from County Carlow in Ireland. He was a member of Seanad Éireann, elected by the Labour Panel from 2002 to 2007.

A member of Carlow Town Council from the 1999 local elections until the abolition in 2003 of the dual mandate, Browne was elected as Mayor of Carlow town in July 2002. At the 2007 general election he stood in Carlow–Kilkenny, but did not win a seat. After his defeat, he stood for the 23rd Seanad on the Cultural and Educational Panel, but was unsuccessful.

He was elected to Carlow County Council in 2009 for the Carlow East local electoral area. He was re-elected to Carlow County Council in May 2014 and was elected as Cathaoirleach (chair) for 2014 to 2015. He was again elected as Cathaoirleach in 2024.

His father John Browne was a senator and a TD for Carlow–Kilkenny.

== See also ==
- Families in the Oireachtas
