= Jim Townsend (Irish politician) =

Irish politician (1937–2021)

Senator
- In office 17 February 1993 – 17 September 1997
- Constituency: Nominated by the Taoiseach

Personal details
- Born: 20 June 1937 County Carlow, Ireland
- Died: 6 January 2021 (aged 83) County Carlow, Ireland
- Party: Labour Party

James Townsend (20 June 1937 – 6 January 2021) was an Irish Labour Party politician and senator.

Townsend stood for the Labour Party in Carlow–Kilkenny at the 1981 Irish general election, taking 2% of the first preference votes, and was not elected. In 1991, he was elected to Carlow County Council, representing the Bagenalstown area. He was appointed to the Seanad Éireann in 1993, serving one term, but was unsuccessful in Carlow–Kilkenny again at the 1997, 2002 and 2007 elections.

At the local level, Townsend served on Carlow Town Council, and was Cathaoirleach of the county council.

He died on 6 January 2021, aged 83.
