= 21st Dáil =

TDs from 1977 to 1981

←	20th Dáil	22nd Dáil	→

Overview
- Legislative body: Dáil Éireann
- Jurisdiction: Ireland
- Meeting place: Leinster House
- Term: 5 July 1977 – 21 May 1981
- Election: 1977 general election
- Government: 15th government of Ireland (1977–1979); 16th government of Ireland (1979–1981)
- Members: 148
- Ceann Comhairle: Pádraig Faulkner — Joseph Brennan until 13 July 1980
- Taoiseach: Charles Haughey — Jack Lynch until 11 December 1979
- Tánaiste: George Colley
- Chief Whip: Seán Moore — Michael Woods until 11 December 1979 — Patrick Lalor until 1 July 1979
- Leader of the Opposition: Garret FitzGerald

Sessions
- 1st: 5 July 1977 – 6 July 1977
- 2nd: 12 October 1977 – 29 June 1978
- 3rd: 11 October 1978 – 18 July 1979
- 4th: 17 October 1979 – 26 June 1980
- 5th: 15 October 1980 – 21 May 1981

The 21st Dáil was elected at the 1977 general election on 16 June 1977 and met on 5 July 1977. The members of Dáil Éireann, the house of representatives of the Oireachtas (legislature) of Ireland, are known as TDs. It sat with the 14th Seanad as the two Houses of the Oireachtas.

The 21st Dáil saw a change of Taoiseach from Jack Lynch to Charles Haughey. On 21 May 1981, President Patrick Hillery dissolved the Dáil on the request of Taoiseach Charles Haughey. The 21st Dáil lasted 3 years, 320 days.

== Composition of the 21st Dáil ==
- 15th, 16th government

Party	June 1977	May 1981	Change
Fianna Fáil	84	81	▼3
Fine Gael	43	45	▲2
Labour	17	16	▼1
Independent Fianna Fáil	1	1	Steady
Independent	3	3	Steady
Ceann Comhairle	—N/a	1	▲1
Vacant	—N/a	1	▲1
Total	148		

In July 1977, Fianna Fáil formed the 15th government of Ireland, a majority government, led by Jack Lynch as Taoiseach. In December 1979, Charles Haughey succeeded as Fianna Fáil leader and Taoiseach, forming the 16th government of Ireland.

=== Graphical representation ===
This is a graphical comparison of party strengths in the 21st Dáil from July 1977. This was not the official seating plan.

== Ceann Comhairle ==
On the meeting of the Dáil, Joseph Brennan (FF) was proposed by Jack Lynch (FF) and seconded by George Colley (FF) for the position of Ceann Comhairle. Seán Treacy (Lab) was proposed by Garret FitzGerald (FG) and seconded by Joseph Bermingham (Lab) for the position. Brennan was elected by a vote of 84 to 60.

Brennan died on 13 July 1980. On 15 October 1980, Pádraig Faulkner (FF) was appointed Ceann Comhairle on a temporary basis. On 16 October 1980, Faulkner was proposed by Jack Lynch for the position on a permanent basis, and was elected without a vote.

== TDs by constituency ==
The list of the 148 TDs elected is given in alphabetical order by Dáil constituency.

Members of the 21st Dáil
Constituency	Name	Party
Carlow–Kilkenny	Liam Aylward	Fianna Fáil
Carlow–Kilkenny	Kieran Crotty	Fine Gael
Carlow–Kilkenny	Jim Gibbons	Fianna Fáil
Carlow–Kilkenny	Tom Nolan	Fianna Fáil
Carlow–Kilkenny	Séamus Pattison	Labour
Cavan–Monaghan	John Conlan	Fine Gael
Cavan–Monaghan	Tom Fitzpatrick	Fine Gael
Cavan–Monaghan	Jimmy Leonard	Fianna Fáil
Cavan–Monaghan	Rory O'Hanlon	Fianna Fáil
Cavan–Monaghan	John Wilson	Fianna Fáil
Clare	Sylvester Barrett	Fianna Fáil
Clare	Brendan Daly	Fianna Fáil
Clare	Frank Taylor	Fine Gael
Cork City	Peter Barry	Fine Gael
Cork City	Seán French	Fianna Fáil
Cork City	Patrick Kerrigan	Labour
Cork City	Jack Lynch	Fianna Fáil
Cork City	Pearse Wyse	Fianna Fáil
Cork Mid	Barry Cogan	Fianna Fáil
Cork Mid	Donal Creed	Fine Gael
Cork Mid	Eileen Desmond	Labour
Cork Mid	Gene Fitzgerald	Fianna Fáil
Cork Mid	Thomas Meaney	Fianna Fáil
Cork North-East	Richard Barry	Fine Gael
Cork North-East	Seán Brosnan	Fianna Fáil
Cork North-East	Jerry Cronin	Fianna Fáil
Cork North-East	Patrick Hegarty	Fine Gael
Cork South-West	Michael Murphy	Labour
Cork South-West	Jim O'Keeffe	Fine Gael
Cork South-West	Joe Walsh	Fianna Fáil
Donegal	Neil Blaney (Note: Blaney was a member of Independent Fianna Fáil.)	Independent
Donegal	Joseph Brennan	Fianna Fáil
Donegal	Hugh Conaghan	Fianna Fáil
Donegal	Paddy Harte	Fine Gael
Donegal	James White	Fine Gael
Dublin Artane	Noël Browne	Independent
Dublin Artane	Charles Haughey	Fianna Fáil
Dublin Artane	Timothy Killeen	Fianna Fáil
Dublin Ballyfermot	Eileen Lemass	Fianna Fáil
Dublin Ballyfermot	Jim Mitchell	Fine Gael
Dublin Ballyfermot	John O'Connell	Labour
Dublin Cabra	Hugh Byrne	Fine Gael
Dublin Cabra	Vivion de Valera	Fianna Fáil
Dublin Cabra	Tom Leonard	Fianna Fáil
Dublin Clontarf	George Colley	Fianna Fáil
Dublin Clontarf	Michael Joe Cosgrave	Fine Gael
Dublin Clontarf	Michael Woods	Fianna Fáil
Dublin County Mid	Síle de Valera	Fianna Fáil
Dublin County Mid	Larry McMahon	Fine Gael
Dublin County Mid	Seán Walsh	Fianna Fáil
Dublin County North	John Boland	Fine Gael
Dublin County North	Ray Burke	Fianna Fáil
Dublin County North	Joe Fox	Fianna Fáil
Dublin County South	Niall Andrews	Fianna Fáil
Dublin County South	John Horgan	Labour
Dublin County South	John Kelly	Fine Gael
Dublin County West	Mark Clinton	Fine Gael
Dublin County West	Liam Lawlor	Fianna Fáil
Dublin County West	Brian Lenihan	Fianna Fáil
Dublin Finglas	Bertie Ahern	Fianna Fáil
Dublin Finglas	Luke Belton	Fine Gael
Dublin Finglas	Jim Tunney	Fianna Fáil
Dublin North-Central	Vincent Brady	Fianna Fáil
Dublin North-Central	Michael Keating	Fine Gael
Dublin North-Central	Michael O'Leary	Labour
Dublin Rathmines West	Gerard Brady	Fianna Fáil
Dublin Rathmines West	Ben Briscoe	Fianna Fáil
Dublin Rathmines West	Richie Ryan	Fine Gael
Dublin South-Central	Frank Cluskey	Labour
Dublin South-Central	Tom Fitzpatrick	Fianna Fáil
Dublin South-Central	Fergus O'Brien	Fine Gael
Dublin South-East	Garret FitzGerald	Fine Gael
Dublin South-East	Seán Moore	Fianna Fáil
Dublin South-East	Ruairi Quinn	Labour
Dún Laoghaire	David Andrews	Fianna Fáil
Dún Laoghaire	Barry Desmond	Labour
Dún Laoghaire	Liam Cosgrave	Fine Gael
Dún Laoghaire	Martin O'Donoghue	Fianna Fáil
Galway East	Johnny Callanan	Fianna Fáil
Galway East	John Donnellan	Fine Gael
Galway East	Thomas Hussey	Fianna Fáil
Galway East	Mark Killilea Jnr	Fianna Fáil
Galway West	Máire Geoghegan-Quinn	Fianna Fáil
Galway West	Bill Loughnane	Fianna Fáil
Galway West	John Mannion Jnr	Fine Gael
Galway West	Bobby Molloy	Fianna Fáil
Kerry North	Kit Ahern	Fianna Fáil
Kerry North	Tom McEllistrim	Fianna Fáil
Kerry North	Dan Spring	Labour
Kerry South	Michael Begley	Fine Gael
Kerry South	Timothy O'Connor	Fianna Fáil
Kerry South	John O'Leary	Fianna Fáil
Kildare	Joseph Bermingham	Labour
Kildare	Charlie McCreevy	Fianna Fáil
Kildare	Paddy Power	Fianna Fáil
Laois–Offaly	Ger Connolly	Fianna Fáil
Laois–Offaly	Bernard Cowen	Fianna Fáil
Laois–Offaly	Tom Enright	Fine Gael
Laois–Offaly	Oliver J. Flanagan	Fine Gael
Laois–Offaly	Patrick Lalor	Fianna Fáil
Limerick East	Michael Herbert	Fianna Fáil
Limerick East	Michael Lipper	Independent
Limerick East	Tom O'Donnell	Fine Gael
Limerick East	Desmond O'Malley	Fianna Fáil
Limerick West	Gerry Collins	Fianna Fáil
Limerick West	Michael J. Noonan	Fianna Fáil
Limerick West	William O'Brien	Fine Gael
Longford–Westmeath	Seán Keegan	Fianna Fáil
Longford–Westmeath	Gerry L'Estrange	Fine Gael
Longford–Westmeath	Albert Reynolds	Fianna Fáil
Longford–Westmeath	Joe Sheridan	Independent
Louth	Paddy Donegan	Fine Gael
Louth	Joseph Farrell	Fianna Fáil
Louth	Pádraig Faulkner	Fianna Fáil
Louth	Eddie Filgate	Fianna Fáil
Mayo East	Seán Calleary	Fianna Fáil
Mayo East	P. J. Morley	Fianna Fáil
Mayo East	Paddy O'Toole	Fine Gael
Mayo West	Pádraig Flynn	Fianna Fáil
Mayo West	Denis Gallagher	Fianna Fáil
Mayo West	Enda Kenny	Fine Gael
Meath	John Bruton	Fine Gael
Meath	Brendan Crinion	Fianna Fáil
Meath	Jim Fitzsimons	Fianna Fáil
Meath	James Tully	Labour
Roscommon–Leitrim	Joan Burke	Fine Gael
Roscommon–Leitrim	Seán Doherty	Fianna Fáil
Roscommon–Leitrim	Terry Leyden	Fianna Fáil
Sligo–Leitrim	James Gallagher	Fianna Fáil
Sligo–Leitrim	Eugene Gilhawley	Fine Gael
Sligo–Leitrim	Ray MacSharry	Fianna Fáil
Tipperary North	Michael O'Kennedy	Fianna Fáil
Tipperary North	John Ryan	Labour
Tipperary North	Michael Smith	Fianna Fáil
Tipperary South	Noel Davern	Fianna Fáil
Tipperary South	Brendan Griffin	Fine Gael
Tipperary South	Seán Treacy	Labour
Waterford	Edward Collins	Fine Gael
Waterford	Austin Deasy	Fine Gael
Waterford	Jackie Fahey	Fianna Fáil
Waterford	Billy Kenneally	Fianna Fáil
Wexford	Lorcan Allen	Fianna Fáil
Wexford	Seán Browne	Fianna Fáil
Wexford	Brendan Corish	Labour
Wexford	Michael D'Arcy	Fine Gael
Wicklow	Liam Kavanagh	Labour
Wicklow	Ciarán Murphy	Fianna Fáil
Wicklow	Godfrey Timmins	Fine Gael

== Changes ==
Date	Constituency	Loss	Gain	Note
5 July 1977	Donegal	Fianna Fáil	Ceann Comhairle	Joseph Brennan takes office as Ceann Comhairle
18 April 1979	Cork North-East	Fianna Fáil		Death of Seán Brosnan
4 July 1979	Cork City	Labour		Death of Patrick Kerrigan
7 November 1979	Cork North-East		Fine Gael	Myra Barry wins seat vacated by the death of Brosnan
7 November 1979	Cork City		Fine Gael	Liam Burke wins seat vacated by the death of Kerrigan
13 July 1980	Donegal	Ceann Comhairle		Death of Joseph Brennan
16 October 1980	Louth	Fianna Fáil	Ceann Comhairle	Pádraig Faulkner takes office as Ceann Comhairle
6 November 1980	Donegal		Fianna Fáil	Clement Coughlan holds seat vacated by the death of Brennan
27 January 1981	Tipperary North	Fianna Fáil		Resignation of Michael O'Kennedy on appointment as EC Commissioner

On 11 February 1981, a motion to move the writ for the vacancy in Tipperary North was rejected on a vote of 40 to 66.
