= Cork City South-East =

Dáil constituency (1969–1977)

- Former Dáil constituency

Former constituency
- Created: 1969
- Abolished: 1977
- Seats: 3
- Local government area: County Cork
- Created from: Cork Borough
- Replaced by: Cork City

Cork City South-East was a parliamentary constituency represented in Dáil Éireann, the lower house of the Irish parliament or Oireachtas from 1969 to 1977. The constituency elected 3 deputies (Teachtaí Dála, commonly known as TDs) to the Dáil, on the system of proportional representation by means of the single transferable vote (PR-STV).

== History ==
The constituency was created under the Electoral (Amendment) Act 1969 for the 1969 general election to Dáil Éireann. The old Cork Borough constituency was divided into the new constituencies of Cork City North-West and Cork City South-East. It was abolished under the Electoral (Amendment) Act 1974, when the Cork City North West and Cork City South East constituencies were replaced by the new constituency of Cork City.

== Boundaries ==
The constituency comprised the southern part of Cork city and suburbs.

== TDs ==
Teachtaí Dála (TDs) for Cork City South-East 1969–1977
Key to parties: FF = Fianna Fáil; FG = Fine Gael
Dáil	Election	Deputy (Party)	Deputy (Party)	Deputy (Party)
19th	1969	Pearse Wyse (FF)	Gus Healy (FF)	Peter Barry (FG)
20th	1973	Pearse Wyse (FF)	Gus Healy (FF)	Peter Barry (FG)
21st	1977	Constituency abolished. See Cork City		

Note: The columns in this table are used only for presentational purposes, and no significance should be attached to the order of columns. For details of the order in which seats were won at each election, see the detailed results of that election.

== Elections ==
*: Outgoing TD

=== 1973 general election ===
1973 general election: Cork City South-East
Party	Candidate	FPv%	Count						
Party	Candidate	FPv%	1	2	3	4	5	6	7
Fianna Fáil	Pearse Wyse	36.2	10,411						
Fine Gael	Peter Barry	22.9	6,566	6,686	6,799	6,841	6,900	7,137	8,489
Fianna Fáil	Gus Healy	16.8	4,836	7,680					
Fine Gael	Seán O'Leary	10.6	3,057	3,140	3,200	3,224	3,269	3,440	4,526
Labour	Robert Rice	8.0	2,290	2,361	2,434	2,458	2,543	3,076	
Aontacht Éireann	Gerard Carroll	4.0	1,162	1,230	1,340	1,361	1,462		
Independent	Timothy O'Sullivan	1.0	289	311	375	406			
Independent	Veronica Hartland	0.4	121	140	216				
Electorate: 36,476 Valid: 28,732 Quota: 7,184 Turnout: 78.8%

=== 1969 general election ===
1969 general election: Cork City South-East
Party	Candidate	FPv%	Count				
Party	Candidate	FPv%	1	2	3	4	5
Fianna Fáil	Pearse Wyse	38.6	10,434				
Fine Gael	Peter Barry	21.9	5,908	6,060	6,208	6,373	8,609
Fianna Fáil	Gus Healy	14.7	3,982	7,164			
Fine Gael	Seán O'Leary	8.8	2,379	2,501	2,581	2,710	
Labour	Con Donovan	8.5	2,295	2,380	2,459	4,412	4,604
Labour	Kevin Hurley	7.5	2,020	2,158	2,260		
Electorate: 35,635 Valid: 27,018 Quota: 6,755 Turnout: 75.8%

== See also ==
- Dáil constituencies
- Politics of the Republic of Ireland
- Historic Dáil constituencies
- Elections in the Republic of Ireland
