= Cork City North-West =

Dáil constituency (1969–1977)

- Former Dáil constituency

Former constituency
- Created: 1969
- Abolished: 1977
- Seats: 3
- Local government area: County Cork
- Created from: Cork Borough
- Replaced by: Cork City

Cork City North-West was a parliamentary constituency represented in Dáil Éireann, the lower house of the Irish parliament or Oireachtas from 1969 to 1977. The constituency elected 3 deputies (Teachtaí Dála, commonly known as TDs) to the Dáil, on the system of proportional representation by means of the single transferable vote (PR-STV).

== History ==
The constituency was created under the Electoral (Amendment) Act 1969 for the 1969 general election to Dáil Éireann. The old Cork Borough constituency was divided into the new constituencies of Cork City North-West and Cork City South-East. It was abolished under the Electoral (Amendment) Act 1974, when the Cork City North-West and Cork City South-East constituencies were replaced by the new constituency of Cork City.

== Boundaries ==
The constituency comprised the north western parts of Cork city and suburbs.

== TDs ==
Teachtaí Dála (TDs) for Cork City North-West 1969–1977
Key to parties: FF = Fianna Fáil; FG = Fine Gael
Dáil	Election	Deputy (Party)	Deputy (Party)	Deputy (Party)
19th	1969	Jack Lynch (FF)	Seán French (FF)	Liam Burke (FG)
20th	1973	Jack Lynch (FF)	Seán French (FF)	Liam Burke (FG)
21st	1977	Constituency abolished. See Cork City		

Note: The columns in this table are used only for presentational purposes, and no significance should be attached to the order of columns. For details of the order in which seats were won at each election, see the detailed results of that election.

== Elections ==
*: Outgoing TD

=== 1973 general election ===
1973 general election: Cork City North-West
Party	Candidate	FPv%	Count					
Party	Candidate	FPv%	1	2	3	4	5	6
Fianna Fáil	Jack Lynch	45.9	12,427					
Fine Gael	Liam Burke	17.1	4,624	4,833	4,886	4,912	6,492	8,303
Fianna Fáil	Seán French	10.0	2,691	7,192				
Independent	Samuel Allen	9.7	2,630	3,306	3,615	3,749	3,911	4,735
Labour	Patrick Kerrigan	9.0	2,425	2,586	2,618	2,739	2,992	
Fine Gael	Vincent O'Connell	7.1	1,916	2,013	2,038	2,075		
Aontacht Éireann	Seán Twomey	1.3	338	358	368			
Electorate: 36,115 Valid: 27,051 Quota: 6,763 Turnout: 74.9%

=== 1969 general election ===
1969 general election: Cork City North-West
Party	Candidate	FPv%	Count				
Party	Candidate	FPv%	1	2	3	4	5
Fianna Fáil	Jack Lynch	43.8	11,227				
Fine Gael	Liam Burke	12.9	3,312	3,426	3,456	5,332	5,953
Independent	Samuel Allen	11.9	3,063	3,613	3,768	4,022	5,572
Labour	Patrick Kerrigan	10.7	2,754	2,882	3,606	3,711	
Fine Gael	Vincent O'Connell	8.7	2,241	2,361	2,413		
Fianna Fáil	Seán French	8.0	2,046	5,874	5,919	5,992	6,220
Labour	Thomas Leahy	3.9	1,001	1,076			
Electorate: 34,573 Valid: 25,644 Quota: 6,412 Turnout: 74.2%

== See also ==
- Dáil constituencies
- Politics of the Republic of Ireland
- Historic Dáil constituencies
- Elections in the Republic of Ireland
