= Senator Kerrigan =

Senator Kerrigan may refer to:

- John E. Kerrigan (1908–1987), Massachusetts State Senate
- Patrick Kerrigan (1928–1979), Senate of Ireland
