= Liam Burke =

Irish politician (1928–2005)

Teachta Dála
- In office November 1992 – May 2002
- In office June 1981 – June 1989
- Constituency: Cork North-Central
- In office November 1979 – June 1981
- Constituency: Cork City
- In office June 1969 – June 1977
- Constituency: Cork City North-West

Senator
- In office 27 October 1977 – 7 November 1979
- Constituency: Administrative Panel
- In office 21 June 1977 – 27 October 1977
- Constituency: Nominated by the Taoiseach

Personal details
- Born: 2 February 1928 Cork, Ireland
- Died: 21 August 2005 (aged 77) Cork, Ireland
- Party: Fine Gael
- Relatives: Tadhg Manley (uncle); Billy Kelleher (cousin)
- Education: University College Cork

Liam Burke (2 February 1928 – 21 August 2005) was an Irish Fine Gael politician. He was a Teachta Dála (TD) for the Cork North-Central constituency. Burke was elected to Dáil Éireann at the 1969 general election for Cork City North-West. After the constituencies were redrawn, he stood at the 1977 general election in the new Cork City constituency, but lost his seat. He was nominated to the 13th Seanad on 21 June 1977 to fill a vacancy. He was elected to the 14th Seanad in October 1977.

He was returned to the 21st Dáil at a by-election on 7 November 1979 in the same constituency, following the death of the Labour Party TD Patrick Kerrigan. That by-election win contributed to the decision of then Taoiseach Jack Lynch to resign in December 1979.

Burke lost his seat for the second time at the 1989 general election but regained it at the 1992 general election. He then retained his seat until retiring aged 74 at the 2002 general election. At that time he and Harry Blaney shared the distinction of being the oldest serving TDs.

He was educated at Christian Brothers College, Cork, and University College Cork. He was Lord Mayor of Cork from 1984 to 1985.

Burke died on 21 August 2005, aged 77.

His sister, Mary Woods, was elected as a councillor for Fine Gael on the Town Council for Midleton, County Cork from 1985 until town councils were abolished in 2014. His uncle Tadhg Manley was a Fine Gael TD from 1954 to 1961. He was a cousin of Fianna Fáil MEP Billy Kelleher.

Civic offices
Preceded by John Dennehy	Lord Mayor of Cork; 1984–1985	Succeeded by Dan Wallace

Dáil	Election	Deputy (Party)	Deputy (Party)	Deputy (Party)
19th	1969	Jack Lynch (FF)	Seán French (FF)	Liam Burke (FG)
20th	1973	Jack Lynch (FF)	Seán French (FF)	Liam Burke (FG)
21st	1977	Constituency abolished. See Cork City		

Dáil	Election	Deputy (Party)	Deputy (Party)	Deputy (Party)	Deputy (Party)	Deputy (Party)
21st	1977	Jack Lynch (FF)	Seán French (FF)	Pearse Wyse (FF)	Patrick Kerrigan (Lab)	Peter Barry (FG)
21st	1979 by-election	Jack Lynch (FF)	Seán French (FF)	Pearse Wyse (FF)	Liam Burke (FG)	Peter Barry (FG)
22nd	1981	Constituency abolished. See Cork North-Central and Cork South-Central				

Dáil	Election	Deputy (Party)	Deputy (Party)	Deputy (Party)	Deputy (Party)	Deputy (Party)
22nd	1981	Toddy O'Sullivan (Lab)	Liam Burke (FG)	Denis Lyons (FF)	Bernard Allen (FG)	Seán French (FF)
23rd	1982 (Feb)	Toddy O'Sullivan (Lab)	Liam Burke (FG)	Denis Lyons (FF)	Bernard Allen (FG)	Seán French (FF)
24th	1982 (Nov)	Toddy O'Sullivan (Lab)	Liam Burke (FG)	Denis Lyons (FF)	Bernard Allen (FG)	Dan Wallace (FF)
25th	1987	Máirín Quill (PDs)	Liam Burke (FG)	Denis Lyons (FF)	Bernard Allen (FG)	Dan Wallace (FF)
26th	1989	Máirín Quill (PDs)	Gerry O'Sullivan (Lab)	Denis Lyons (FF)	Bernard Allen (FG)	Dan Wallace (FF)
27th	1992	Máirín Quill (PDs)	Gerry O'Sullivan (Lab)	Liam Burke (FG)	Bernard Allen (FG)	Dan Wallace (FF)
27th	1994 by-election	Máirín Quill (PDs)	Kathleen Lynch (DL)	Liam Burke (FG)	Bernard Allen (FG)	Dan Wallace (FF)
28th	1997	Billy Kelleher (FF)	Noel O'Flynn (FF)	Liam Burke (FG)	Bernard Allen (FG)	Dan Wallace (FF)
29th	2002	Billy Kelleher (FF)	Noel O'Flynn (FF)	Kathleen Lynch (Lab)	Bernard Allen (FG)	Dan Wallace (FF)
30th	2007	Billy Kelleher (FF)	Noel O'Flynn (FF)	Kathleen Lynch (Lab)	Bernard Allen (FG)	4 seats from 2007
31st	2011	Billy Kelleher (FF)	Jonathan O'Brien (SF)	Kathleen Lynch (Lab)	Dara Murphy (FG)	4 seats from 2007
32nd	2016	Billy Kelleher (FF)	Jonathan O'Brien (SF)	Mick Barry (AAA–PBP)	Dara Murphy (FG)	4 seats from 2007
32nd	2019 by-election	Pádraig O'Sullivan (FF)	Jonathan O'Brien (SF)	Mick Barry (AAA–PBP)	Dara Murphy (FG)	4 seats from 2007
33rd	2020	Pádraig O'Sullivan (FF)	Thomas Gould (SF)	Mick Barry (S–PBP)	Colm Burke (FG)	4 seats from 2007
34th	2024	Pádraig O'Sullivan (FF)	Thomas Gould (SF)	Eoghan Kenny (Lab)	Colm Burke (FG)	Ken O'Flynn (II)
