= Pearse Wyse =

Irish politician (1923–2009)

Minister of State
- 1978–1979: Finance

Parliamentary Secretary
- 1977–1978: Finance

Teachta Dála
- In office June 1981 – November 1992
- Constituency: Cork South-Central
- In office June 1977 – June 1981
- Constituency: Cork City
- In office June 1969 – June 1977
- Constituency: Cork City South-East
- In office April 1965 – June 1969
- Constituency: Cork Borough

Personal details
- Born: Jeremiah Pearse Wyse; 2 March 1923 Cork, Ireland
- Died: 28 April 2009 (aged 86) Cork, Ireland
- Party: Progressive Democrats (1986–1999)
- Other political affiliations: Fianna Fáil (1947–1986)
- Spouse: Theresa Lucey (m. 1976)
- Children: 1
- Education: Cork College of Commerce

Pearse Wyse (2 March 1923 – 28 April 2009) was an Irish politician, a long-serving member of Fianna Fáil who was later an early member of the Progressive Democrats.

He was born in Cork in 1923, son of John Wyse (or Wise), pawnbroker's clerk, and his wife Julia (née Cronin), a native of Macroom. Wyse was educated at Greenmount national school in Cork, and at Cork College of Commerce, where he trained as a bookbinder and paper cutter. He was employed at the Eagle Printing Works, where by the early 1960s he became works manager, and was a longstanding member of the Irish Bookbinders' and Allied Trades Union.

He first held political office in 1960 when he was elected to Cork City Council. Five years later he was first elected to Dáil Éireann as a Fianna Fáil Teachta Dála (TD) and running mate of Jack Lynch at the 1965 general election for the Cork Borough constituency. Following boundary changes, he served as TD for Cork City South-East (1969–1977), Cork City (1977–1981) and Cork South-Central (1981–1992). He retired from national politics at the 1992 general election.

Wyse was appointed Parliamentary Secretary to the Minister for Finance in 1977 on the nomination of Jack Lynch, becoming Minister of State at the Department of Finance in 1978 when the structure of positions were changed. Wyse supported George Colley in the 1979 Fianna Fáil leadership election which was won by Charles Haughey, and he was dropped from the junior ministerial ranks.

Wyse opposed Haughey in every leadership challenge from when he assumed the role, becoming a member of the so-called Gang of 22. He was an associate of Desmond O'Malley and by 1985 he was completely disaffected from the party leadership. In early 1986, he joined the Progressive Democrats, founded by O'Malley. He held his seat as a Progressive Democrats TD at the 1987 and 1989 general elections.

Wyse's seat was retained by Pat Cox at the 1992 general election. He remained a member of Cork City Council until he retired in 1999, having held his seat for almost forty years. He also served as Lord Mayor of Cork in 1967 and 1974.

Wyse died on 28 April 2009 in Cork, aged 81.

Civic offices
Preceded by Seán McCarthy	Lord Mayor of Cork; 1967–1968	Succeeded by John Bermingham
Preceded by Patrick Kerrigan	Lord Mayor of Cork; 1974–1975	Succeeded by Gus Healy
Political offices
Preceded by Michael Begley	Parliamentary Secretary to the Minister for Finance; 1977–1978	Succeeded by Office of Minister of State at the Department of Finance
Preceded by Office of Parliamentary Secretary to the Minister for Finance	Minister of State at the Department of Finance; 1978–1979	Succeeded by Tom McEllistrim

Dáil	Election	Deputy (Party)	Deputy (Party)	Deputy (Party)	Deputy (Party)	Deputy (Party)
2nd	1921	Liam de Róiste (SF)	Mary MacSwiney (SF)	Donal O'Callaghan (SF)	J. J. Walsh (SF)	4 seats 1921–1923
3rd	1922	Liam de Róiste (PT-SF)	Mary MacSwiney (AT-SF)	Robert Day (Lab)	J. J. Walsh (PT-SF)	4 seats 1921–1923
4th	1923	Richard Beamish (Ind.)	Mary MacSwiney (Rep)	Andrew O'Shaughnessy (Ind.)	J. J. Walsh (CnaG)	Alfred O'Rahilly (CnaG)
4th	1924 by-election	Richard Beamish (Ind.)	Mary MacSwiney (Rep)	Andrew O'Shaughnessy (Ind.)	J. J. Walsh (CnaG)	Michael Egan (CnaG)
5th	1927 (Jun)	John Horgan (NL)	Seán French (FF)	Richard Anthony (Lab)	J. J. Walsh (CnaG)	Barry Egan (CnaG)
6th	1927 (Sep)	W. T. Cosgrave (CnaG)	Seán French (FF)	Richard Anthony (Lab)	Hugo Flinn (FF)	Barry Egan (CnaG)
7th	1932	W. T. Cosgrave (CnaG)	Thomas Dowdall (FF)	Richard Anthony (Ind.)	Hugo Flinn (FF)	William Desmond (CnaG)
8th	1933	W. T. Cosgrave (CnaG)	Thomas Dowdall (FF)	Richard Anthony (Ind.)	Hugo Flinn (FF)	William Desmond (CnaG)
9th	1937	W. T. Cosgrave (FG)	Thomas Dowdall (FF)	Richard Anthony (Ind.)	Hugo Flinn (FF)	4 seats 1937–1948
10th	1938	W. T. Cosgrave (FG)	Thomas Dowdall (FF)	James Hickey (Lab)	Hugo Flinn (FF)	4 seats 1937–1948
11th	1943	W. T. Cosgrave (FG)	Frank Daly (FF)	Richard Anthony (Ind.)	Séamus Fitzgerald (FF)	4 seats 1937–1948
12th	1944	William Dwyer (Ind.)	Frank Daly (FF)	Richard Anthony (Ind.)	Walter Furlong (FF)	4 seats 1937–1948
12th	1946 by-election	Patrick McGrath (FF)	Frank Daly (FF)	Richard Anthony (Ind.)	Walter Furlong (FF)	4 seats 1937–1948
13th	1948	Patrick McGrath (FF)	Michael Sheehan (Ind.)	James Hickey (NLP)	Jack Lynch (FF)	Thomas F. O'Higgins (FG)
14th	1951	Patrick McGrath (FF)	Seán McCarthy (FF)	James Hickey (Lab)	Jack Lynch (FF)	Thomas F. O'Higgins (FG)
14th	1954 by-election	Patrick McGrath (FF)	Seán McCarthy (FF)	James Hickey (Lab)	Jack Lynch (FF)	Stephen Barrett (FG)
15th	1954	Patrick McGrath (FF)	Anthony Barry (FG)	Seán Casey (Lab)	Jack Lynch (FF)	Stephen Barrett (FG)
15th	1956 by-election	John Galvin (FF)	Anthony Barry (FG)	Seán Casey (Lab)	Jack Lynch (FF)	Stephen Barrett (FG)
16th	1957	John Galvin (FF)	Gus Healy (FF)	Seán Casey (Lab)	Jack Lynch (FF)	Stephen Barrett (FG)
17th	1961	John Galvin (FF)	Anthony Barry (FG)	Seán Casey (Lab)	Jack Lynch (FF)	Stephen Barrett (FG)
17th	1964 by-election	Sheila Galvin (FF)	Anthony Barry (FG)	Seán Casey (Lab)	Jack Lynch (FF)	Stephen Barrett (FG)
18th	1965	Gus Healy (FF)	Pearse Wyse (FF)	Seán Casey (Lab)	Jack Lynch (FF)	Stephen Barrett (FG)
18th	1967 by-election	Gus Healy (FF)	Pearse Wyse (FF)	Seán French (FF)	Jack Lynch (FF)	Stephen Barrett (FG)
19th	1969	Constituency abolished. See Cork City North-West and Cork City South-East				

Dáil	Election	Deputy (Party)	Deputy (Party)	Deputy (Party)
19th	1969	Pearse Wyse (FF)	Gus Healy (FF)	Peter Barry (FG)
20th	1973	Pearse Wyse (FF)	Gus Healy (FF)	Peter Barry (FG)
21st	1977	Constituency abolished. See Cork City		

Dáil	Election	Deputy (Party)	Deputy (Party)	Deputy (Party)	Deputy (Party)	Deputy (Party)
21st	1977	Jack Lynch (FF)	Seán French (FF)	Pearse Wyse (FF)	Patrick Kerrigan (Lab)	Peter Barry (FG)
21st	1979 by-election	Jack Lynch (FF)	Seán French (FF)	Pearse Wyse (FF)	Liam Burke (FG)	Peter Barry (FG)
22nd	1981	Constituency abolished. See Cork North-Central and Cork South-Central				

Dáil	Election	Deputy (Party)	Deputy (Party)	Deputy (Party)	Deputy (Party)	Deputy (Party)
22nd	1981	Eileen Desmond (Lab)	Gene Fitzgerald (FF)	Pearse Wyse (FF)	Hugh Coveney (FG)	Peter Barry (FG)
23rd	1982 (Feb)	Eileen Desmond (Lab)	Gene Fitzgerald (FF)	Pearse Wyse (FF)	Jim Corr (FG)	Peter Barry (FG)
24th	1982 (Nov)	Eileen Desmond (Lab)	Gene Fitzgerald (FF)	Pearse Wyse (FF)	Hugh Coveney (FG)	Peter Barry (FG)
25th	1987	Toddy O'Sullivan (Lab)	John Dennehy (FF)	Batt O'Keeffe (FF)	Pearse Wyse (PDs)	Peter Barry (FG)
26th	1989	Toddy O'Sullivan (Lab)	John Dennehy (FF)	Micheál Martin (FF)	Pearse Wyse (PDs)	Peter Barry (FG)
27th	1992	Toddy O'Sullivan (Lab)	Batt O'Keeffe (FF)	Micheál Martin (FF)	Pat Cox (PDs)	Peter Barry (FG)
27th	1994 by-election	Toddy O'Sullivan (Lab)	Batt O'Keeffe (FF)	Micheál Martin (FF)	Hugh Coveney (FG)	Peter Barry (FG)
28th	1997	John Dennehy (FF)	Batt O'Keeffe (FF)	Micheál Martin (FF)	Hugh Coveney (FG)	Deirdre Clune (FG)
28th	1998 by-election	John Dennehy (FF)	Batt O'Keeffe (FF)	Micheál Martin (FF)	Simon Coveney (FG)	Deirdre Clune (FG)
29th	2002	John Dennehy (FF)	Batt O'Keeffe (FF)	Micheál Martin (FF)	Simon Coveney (FG)	Dan Boyle (GP)
30th	2007	Ciarán Lynch (Lab)	Michael McGrath (FF)	Micheál Martin (FF)	Simon Coveney (FG)	Deirdre Clune (FG)
31st	2011	Ciarán Lynch (Lab)	Michael McGrath (FF)	Micheál Martin (FF)	Simon Coveney (FG)	Jerry Buttimer (FG)
32nd	2016	Donnchadh Ó Laoghaire (SF)	Michael McGrath (FF)	Micheál Martin (FF)	Simon Coveney (FG)	4 seats 2016–2024
33rd	2020	Donnchadh Ó Laoghaire (SF)	Michael McGrath (FF)	Micheál Martin (FF)	Simon Coveney (FG)	4 seats 2016–2024
34th	2024	Donnchadh Ó Laoghaire (SF)	Séamus McGrath (FF)	Micheál Martin (FF)	Jerry Buttimer (FG)	Pádraig Rice (SD)
