= Dublin Finglas =

Dáil constituency (1977–1981)

- Former Dáil constituency

Former constituency
- Created: 1977
- Abolished: 1981
- Seats: 3
- Local government area: Dublin City

Dublin Finglas was a parliamentary constituency represented in Dáil Éireann, the lower house of the Irish parliament or Oireachtas from 1977 to 1981. The constituency elected 3 deputies (Teachtaí Dála, commonly known as TDs) to the Dáil, using proportional representation by means of the single transferable vote (PR-STV).

== History ==
The constituency was created in 1977, under the Electoral (Amendment) Act 1974, taking in much of the former Dublin North-West constituency together with parts of Dublin South-West, as part of the redistribution of constituencies which attempted to secure the re-election of the outgoing Fine Gael–Labour Party government. The constituency was abolished in 1981 with much of it going into a revived Dublin North-West constituency.

Its only election was notable for marking the debut in national politics of Bertie Ahern. Proinsias De Rossa also contested his first Dáil election here.

== Boundaries ==
It covered the Finglas area of Dublin city, together with small parts of Drumcondra and Glasnevin. The 1974 Act defined the constituency's boundaries as consisting of the following wards of the county borough of Dublin: Drumcondra South C, Finglas East A, Finglas East B, Finglas East D, Finglas East E, Finglas East F, Finglas West A, Finglas West B, Finglas West C, Glasnevin B, Inns Quay A.

== TDs ==
Teachtaí Dála (TDs) for Dublin Finglas 1977–1981
Key to parties: FF = Fianna Fáil; FG = Fine Gael
| Dáil | Election | Deputy (Party) | Deputy (Party) | Deputy (Party) |
| 21st | 1977 | Jim Tunney (FF) | Bertie Ahern (FF) | Luke Belton (FG) |
| 22nd | 1981 | Constituency abolished | | |

Note: The columns in this table are used only for presentational purposes, and no significance should be attached to the order of columns. For details of the order in which seats were won at each election, see the detailed results of that election.

== 1977 general election ==
*: Outgoing TD

1977 general election: Dublin Finglas
| Party | Candidate | FPv% | Count | | | | | | | |
| Party | Candidate | FPv% | 1 | 2 | 3 | 4 | 5 | 6 | 7 | 8 |
|---|---|---|---|---|---|---|---|---|---|---|
| Fianna Fáil | Jim Tunney | 28.8 | 7,963 | | | | | | | |
| Fianna Fáil | Bertie Ahern | 14.1 | 3,729 | 4,100 | 4,127 | 4,271 | 4,518 | 4,646 | 7,688 | |
| Fine Gael | Luke Belton | 13.5 | 3,896 | 3,917 | 3,996 | 4,049 | 4,211 | 6,167 | 6,305 | 6,718 |
| Labour | Brendan Halligan | 11.0 | 3,055 | 3,073 | 3,781 | 3,991 | 4,835 | 5,361 | 5,544 | 5,894 |
| Fianna Fáil | Daniel Bell | 9.4 | 2,598 | 3,152 | 3,199 | 3,345 | 3,638 | 3,742 | | |
| Fine Gael | Alice Glenn | 8.9 | 2,452 | 2,470 | 2,585 | 2,645 | 2,883 | | | |
| Independent | Matt Merrigan | 5.5 | 1,512 | 1,536 | 1,690 | 2,372 | | | | |
| Sinn Féin The Workers' Party | Proinsias De Rossa | 4.8 | 1,317 | 1,332 | 1,378 | | | | | |
| Labour | Billy Keegan | 4.2 | 1,174 | 1,191 | | | | | | |
Electorate: 39,953 Valid: 27,696 Quota: 6,925 Turnout: 69.3%

== See also ==
- Dáil constituencies
- Politics of the Republic of Ireland
- Historic Dáil constituencies
- Elections in the Republic of Ireland
