= Gang of 22 =

Faction in Fianna Fáil in 1980s

The Gang of 22 was a group of Fianna Fáil TDs (members of parliament) who were opposed to the leadership of Charles Haughey in the early 1980s. The very evident division within the Fianna Fáil parliamentary party left a deep split in the organisation. The name is a reference to the Gang of Four, a political faction in the People's Republic of China who were imprisoned after the death of Mao Zedong.

== Background ==
The origins of the "Gang of 22" was when Desmond O'Malley challenged Charles Haughey for the leadership of Fianna Fáil in 1983. Disillusioned with the unwillingness of O'Malley, George Colley and their supporters to act, a motion of no confidence against Charles Haughey's leadership was put forward by Charlie McCreevy on his own initiative. This forced O'Malley's hand and he had to declare his intention to stand against Haughey. The vote failed by 55 votes to 22.

Those who made up the Gang of 22 were:

- David Andrews
- Sylvester Barrett
- Thomas Bellew
- Séamus Brennan
- Hugh Byrne
- Seán Byrne
- George Colley
- Hugh Conaghan
- Pádraig Faulkner
- Tom Fitzpatrick
- Seán French
- Jim Gibbons
- Mary Harney
- Tom Meaney
- Charlie McCreevy
- Bobby Molloy
- Ciarán Murphy
- Willie O'Dea
- Martin O'Donoghue
- Desmond O'Malley
- Joe Walsh
- Pearse Wyse

In a 2025 interview, Hugh Byrne revealed that he had received a death threat by telephone for having been a member of this group.

=== 1991 leadership challenge ===
In September 1991 four backbench Fianna Fáil TDs: Noel Dempsey, Liam Fitzgerald, M. J. Nolan and Seán Power (known as the Gang of Four) put down a motion of no-confidence in Haughey's leadership in Power's name. This prompted Albert Reynolds to resign from the Cabinet and launch a leadership challenge. He was supported by fellow Minister Pádraig Flynn and Minister of State Máire Geoghegan-Quinn and subsequently Noel Treacy. The vote failed by 55 votes to 22.

This is a partial list:

- David Andrews
- Michael Barrett
- Brian Cowen
- Noel Dempsey
- Jackie Fahey
- Liam Fitzgerald
- Pádraig Flynn
- Máire Geoghegan-Quinn
- Brian Hillery
- Tom Kitt
- Liam Lawlor
- Jimmy Leonard
- Charlie McCreevy
- M. J. Nolan
- John O'Connell
- Willie O'Dea
- Seán Power
- Albert Reynolds
- Michael Smith
- Noel Treacy
- Joe Walsh
