= Cork City (Dáil constituency) =

Dáil constituency (1977–1981)

- Former Dáil constituency

Former constituency
- Created: 1977
- Abolished: 1981
- Seats: 5
- Local government area: Cork City
- Created from: Cork City North-West; Cork City South-East
- Replaced by: Cork North-Central; Cork South-Central

Cork City was a parliamentary constituency represented in Dáil Éireann, the lower house of the Irish parliament or Oireachtas from 1977 to 1981. The constituency elected 5 deputies (Teachtaí Dála, commonly known as TDs) to the Dáil, on the system of proportional representation by means of the single transferable vote (PR-STV).

== History and boundaries ==
The constituency was created under the Electoral (Amendment) Act 1974. It was only used for the 1977 general election and a by-election in 1979. The constituency was defined as the county borough of Cork, except the part which was in the Cork Mid constituency. The wards in Cork Mid were Bishopstown E, Gillabbey B, Gillabbey C, Glasheen A, Glasheen B, Glasheen C, Pouladuff A, Pouladuff B, The Lough, Togher A, Togher B.

It was abolished under the Electoral (Amendment) Act 1980 and replaced at the 1981 general election by Cork North-Central and Cork South-Central.

== TDs ==
Teachtaí Dála (TDs) for Cork City 1977–1981
Key to parties: FF = Fianna Fáil; FG = Fine Gael; Lab = Labour
Dáil	Election	Deputy (Party)	Deputy (Party)	Deputy (Party)	Deputy (Party)	Deputy (Party)
21st	1977	Jack Lynch (FF)	Seán French (FF)	Pearse Wyse (FF)	Patrick Kerrigan (Lab)	Peter Barry (FG)
21st	1979 by-election	Jack Lynch (FF)	Seán French (FF)	Pearse Wyse (FF)	Liam Burke (FG)	Peter Barry (FG)
22nd	1981	Constituency abolished. See Cork North-Central and Cork South-Central				

Note: The columns in this table are used only for presentational purposes, and no significance should be attached to the order of columns. For details of the order in which seats were won at each election, see the detailed results of that election.

== Elections ==
*: Outgoing TD

=== 1979 by-election ===
Following the death of Labour Party TD Patrick Kerrigan, a by-election was held on 7 November 1979. The seat was won by the Fine Gael candidate Liam Burke.

1979 by-election: Cork City
Party	Candidate	FPv%	Count		
Party	Candidate	FPv%	1	2	3
Fianna Fáil	John Dennehy	35.9	13,890	14,269	16,210
Fine Gael	Liam Burke	33.2	12,832	13,411	19,524
Labour	Toddy O'Sullivan	22.6	8,742	10,444	
Sinn Féin The Workers' Party	Ted Tynan	8.3	3,193		
Electorate: 70,164 Valid: 38,657 Quota: 19,329 Turnout: 55.1%

=== 1977 general election ===
1977 general election: Cork City
Party	Candidate	FPv%	Count							
Party	Candidate	FPv%	1	2	3	4	5	6	7	8
Fianna Fáil	Jack Lynch	39.0	20,079							
Fine Gael	Peter Barry	13.5	6,923	7,098	7,117	7,506	7,566	9,327		
Labour	Patrick Kerrigan	10.2	5,254	5,551	5,577	5,883	6,575	7,121	7,214	10,313
Fianna Fáil	Pearse Wyse	8.7	4,462	9,718						
Fianna Fáil	Seán French	6.5	3,359	6,357	6,975	7,186	7,458	7,597	7,605	7,806
Fine Gael	Liam Burke	6.0	3,082	3,188	3,195	3,322	3,409	3,993	4,634	
Fine Gael	Samuel Allen	5.5	2,850	3,011	3,021	3,159	3,283			
Fianna Fáil	Máirín Quill	4.4	2,262	4,423	4,844	5,179	5,483	5,575	5,583	5,722
Sinn Féin The Workers' Party	Ted Tynan	3.2	1,661	1,832	1,848	1,992				
Independent	Maureen Black	2.9	1,529	1,706	1,730					
Electorate: 68,709 Valid: 51,461 (74.9%) Spoilt: 376 (0.6%) Quota: 8,577 Turnout: 51,837 (75.4%)

== See also ==
- Politics of the Republic of Ireland
- Historic Dáil constituencies
- Elections in the Republic of Ireland
