= Patrick Kerrigan =

Irish politician (1928–1979)

Teachta Dála
- In office June 1977 – 4 July 1979
- Constituency: Cork City

Senator
- In office 1 June 1973 – 16 June 1977
- Constituency: Nominated by the Taoiseach

Personal details
- Born: 21 February 1928 County Cork, Ireland
- Died: 4 July 1979 (aged 51) County Cork, Ireland
- Party: Labour Party

Patrick Kerrigan (21 February 1928 – 4 July 1979) was an Irish Labour Party Senator and later a Teachta Dála (TD).

A trade union official, Kerrigan was an unsuccessful candidate in the Cork City North-West constituency at the 1969 general election. He lost again at the 1973 general election, when a Fine Gael-Labour Party coalition government took office. Kerrigan was then nominated by the Taoiseach, Liam Cosgrave, to the 13th Seanad, where he served until 1977.

At the 1977 general election, Kerrigan was elected in the new five-seat Cork City constituency, where Fianna Fáil leader Jack Lynch topped the poll with over 39% of the vote, leading his party to a landslide 20-seat majority in the 144-seat Dáil Éireann.

Kerrigan took his seat in the 21st Dáil, but died in office two years later on 4 July 1979, aged 51. The by-election for his Dáil seat was held on 7 November and won by Fine Gael's Liam Burke, a former TD who had lost his seat to Kerrigan at the 1977 general election.

Kerrigan was also Lord Mayor of Cork for the 1973 to 1974.

Civic offices
Preceded by Seán O'Leary	Lord Mayor of Cork; 1973–1974	Succeeded by Pearse Wyse

Dáil	Election	Deputy (Party)	Deputy (Party)	Deputy (Party)	Deputy (Party)	Deputy (Party)
21st	1977	Jack Lynch (FF)	Seán French (FF)	Pearse Wyse (FF)	Patrick Kerrigan (Lab)	Peter Barry (FG)
21st	1979 by-election	Jack Lynch (FF)	Seán French (FF)	Pearse Wyse (FF)	Liam Burke (FG)	Peter Barry (FG)
22nd	1981	Constituency abolished. See Cork North-Central and Cork South-Central				
