= 1979 Cork North-East by-election =

By-election to the 21st Dáil

- 7 November 1979
- Turnout: 41,206 (68.6%)
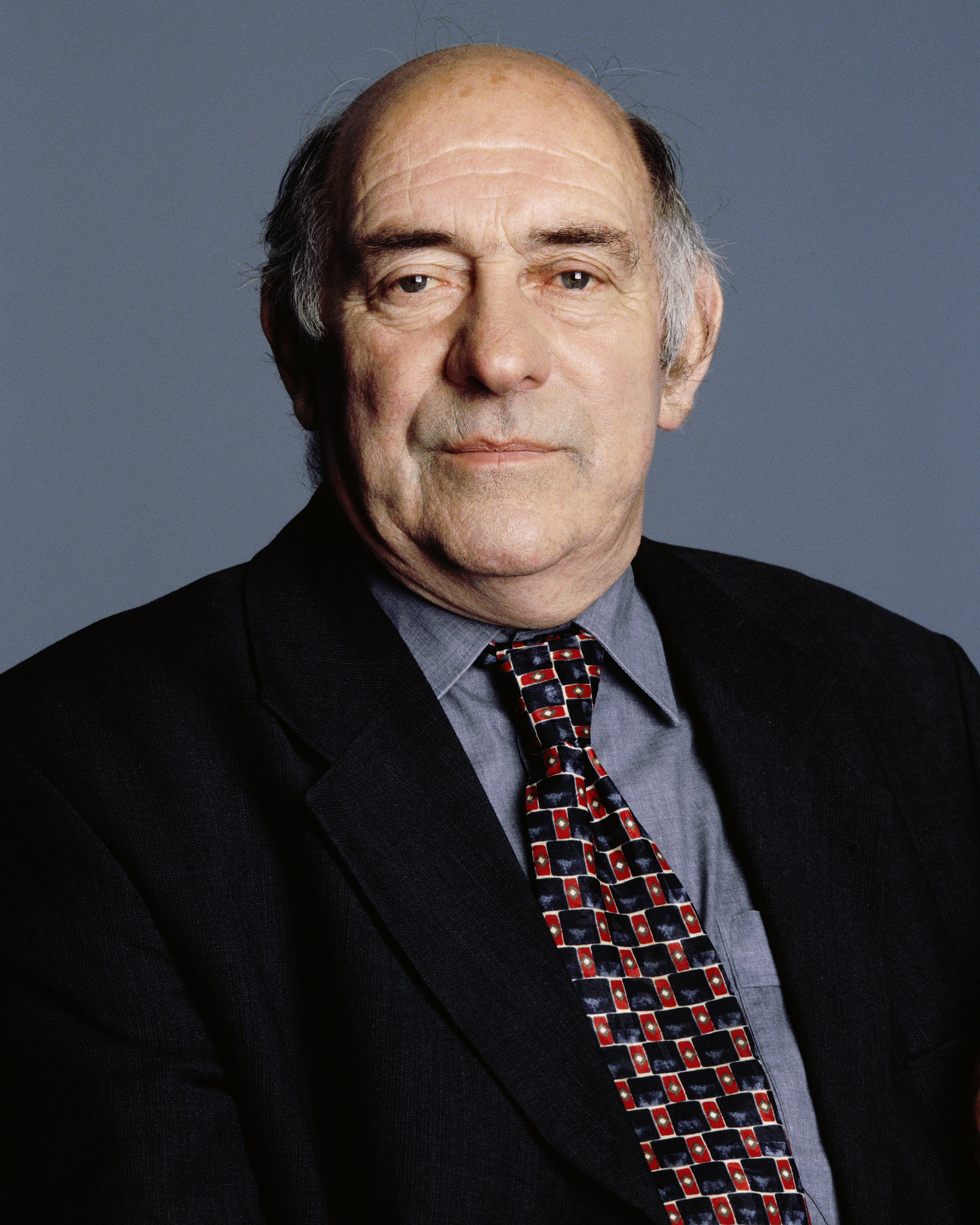
	Barry	Brosnan
Nominee	Myra Barry	John Brosnan	Joe Sherlock
Party	Fine Gael	Fianna Fáil	Sinn Féin The Workers' Party
First preferences	15,939	14,961	9,395
Percentage	38.7%	36.3%	22.8%
Final count	20,292	17,883	–
TD before election
Seán Brosnan
Fianna Fáil
TD after election
Myra Barry
Fine Gael

A Dáil by-election was held in the constituency of Cork North-East in Ireland on Wednesday, 7 November 1979, to fill a vacancy in the 21st Dáil. It followed the death of Fianna Fáil Teachta Dála (TD) Seán Brosnan on 18 April 1979.

A government motion to issue the writ of election to fill the vacancy was agreed by the Dáil on 17 October 1979.

The by-election was won by the Fine Gael candidate Myra Barry. It was held on the same day as the 1979 Cork City by-election.

Both by-elections were won by Fine Gael candidates. The victory of Fine Gael in both by-elections contributed to the decision of Jack Lynch to step down as leader of Fianna Fáil and Taoiseach the following month.

== Result ==
1979 Cork North-East by-election
Party	Candidate	FPv%	Count	
Party	Candidate	FPv%	1	2
Fine Gael	Myra Barry	38.7	15,939	20,292
Fianna Fáil	John Brosnan	36.3	14,961	17,883
Sinn Féin The Workers' Party	Joe Sherlock	22.8	9,395	
Independent	Mary Ann Duggan	2.2	911	
Electorate: 60,075 Valid: 41,206 Quota: 20,604 Turnout: 68.6%
