= Myra Barry =

Irish former politician (born 1957)

Teachta Dála
- In office June 1981 – February 1987
- Constituency: Cork East
- In office November 1979 – June 1981
- Constituency: Cork North-East

Personal details
- Born: 30 June 1957 (age 69) Cork, Ireland
- Party: Fine Gael
- Parent: Richard Barry (father)
- Education: St Patrick's College, Dublin

Myra Barry (born 30 June 1957) is an Irish former Fine Gael politician who served as a Teachta Dála (TD) from 1979 to 1987.

A national school teacher by profession, she trained at St Patrick's College, Dublin. She was first elected to Dáil Éireann as a Fine Gael TD following a by-election in 1979 for the Cork North-East constituency, following the death of Fianna Fáil TD Seán Brosnan. It was one of two by-elections in County Cork on the same day, both of which Fianna Fáil lost. The double defeat in Jack Lynch's native county was a factor in Lynch's resignation on 5 December 1979 as Taoiseach and leader of Fianna Fáil.

Her father Richard Barry was a sitting TD in the same constituency at the time of the by-election. This is the only time a parent and child have represented the same constituency at the same time in the same Dáil.

Barry was 22 years old at the time of her first election, and one of the youngest-ever TDs elected to the Dáil. She was re-elected at each successive election until she retired from politics at the 1987 general election, after seven years in the Dáil. She retired after four successful election campaigns – topping the poll on each occasion – and still less than 30 years of age.

After politics, she qualified as a clinical psychologist.

== See also ==
- Families in the Oireachtas

Honorary titles
Preceded by Síle de Valera	Baby of the Dáil; 1979–1981	Succeeded by Ivan Yates

Dáil	Election	Deputy (Party)	Deputy (Party)	Deputy (Party)	Deputy (Party)	Deputy (Party)
17th	1961	John Moher (FF)	Martin Corry (FF)	Philip Burton (FG)	Richard Barry (FG)	Patrick McAuliffe (Lab)
18th	1965	Jerry Cronin (FF)	Martin Corry (FF)	Philip Burton (FG)	Richard Barry (FG)	Patrick McAuliffe (Lab)
19th	1969	Jerry Cronin (FF)	Seán Brosnan (FF)	Gerard Cott (FG)	Richard Barry (FG)	4 seats 1969–1981
20th	1973	Jerry Cronin (FF)	Liam Ahern (FF)	Patrick Hegarty (FG)	Richard Barry (FG)	4 seats 1969–1981
20th	1974 by-election	Jerry Cronin (FF)	Seán Brosnan (FF)	Patrick Hegarty (FG)	Richard Barry (FG)	4 seats 1969–1981
21st	1977	Jerry Cronin (FF)	Seán Brosnan (FF)	Patrick Hegarty (FG)	Richard Barry (FG)	4 seats 1969–1981
21st	1979 by-election	Jerry Cronin (FF)	Myra Barry (FG)	Patrick Hegarty (FG)	Richard Barry (FG)	4 seats 1969–1981
22nd	1981	Constituency abolished. See Cork East and Cork North-West				

Dáil	Election	Deputy (Party)	Deputy (Party)	Deputy (Party)	Deputy (Party)	Deputy (Party)
4th	1923	John Daly (Ind.)	Michael Hennessy (CnaG)	David Kent (Rep)	John Dinneen (FP)	Thomas O'Mahony (CnaG)
4th	1924 by-election	John Daly (Ind.)	Michael Hennessy (CnaG)	David Kent (Rep)	John Dinneen (FP)	Michael K. Noonan (CnaG)
5th	1927 (Jun)	John Daly (Ind.)	Michael Hennessy (CnaG)	David Kent (SF)	David O'Gorman (FP)	Martin Corry (FF)
6th	1927 (Sep)	John Daly (CnaG)	Michael Hennessy (CnaG)	William Kent (FF)	Edmond Carey (CnaG)	Martin Corry (FF)
7th	1932	John Daly (CnaG)	William Broderick (CnaG)	Brook Brasier (Ind.)	Patrick Murphy (FF)	Martin Corry (FF)
8th	1933	Patrick Daly (CnaG)	William Broderick (CnaG)	William Kent (NCP)	Patrick Murphy (FF)	Martin Corry (FF)
9th	1937	Constituency abolished				

Dáil	Election	Deputy (Party)	Deputy (Party)	Deputy (Party)
13th	1948	Martin Corry (FF)	Patrick O'Gorman (FG)	Seán Keane (Lab)
14th	1951	Martin Corry (FF)	Patrick O'Gorman (FG)	Seán Keane (Lab)
14th	1953 by-election	Martin Corry (FF)	Patrick O'Gorman (FG)	Richard Barry (FG)
15th	1954	Martin Corry (FF)	John Moher (FF)	Richard Barry (FG)
16th	1957	Martin Corry (FF)	John Moher (FF)	Richard Barry (FG)
17th	1961	Constituency abolished		

Dáil	Election	Deputy (Party)	Deputy (Party)	Deputy (Party)	Deputy (Party)
22nd	1981	Carey Joyce (FF)	Myra Barry (FG)	Patrick Hegarty (FG)	Joe Sherlock (SF–WP)
23rd	1982 (Feb)	Michael Ahern (FF)	Myra Barry (FG)	Patrick Hegarty (FG)	Joe Sherlock (SF–WP)
24th	1982 (Nov)	Michael Ahern (FF)	Myra Barry (FG)	Patrick Hegarty (FG)	Ned O'Keeffe (FF)
25th	1987	Michael Ahern (FF)	Joe Sherlock (WP)	Patrick Hegarty (FG)	Ned O'Keeffe (FF)
26th	1989	Michael Ahern (FF)	Joe Sherlock (WP)	Paul Bradford (FG)	Ned O'Keeffe (FF)
27th	1992	Michael Ahern (FF)	John Mulvihill (Lab)	Paul Bradford (FG)	Ned O'Keeffe (FF)
28th	1997	Michael Ahern (FF)	David Stanton (FG)	Paul Bradford (FG)	Ned O'Keeffe (FF)
29th	2002	Michael Ahern (FF)	David Stanton (FG)	Joe Sherlock (Lab)	Ned O'Keeffe (FF)
30th	2007	Michael Ahern (FF)	David Stanton (FG)	Seán Sherlock (Lab)	Ned O'Keeffe (FF)
31st	2011	Sandra McLellan (SF)	David Stanton (FG)	Seán Sherlock (Lab)	Tom Barry (FG)
32nd	2016	Pat Buckley (SF)	David Stanton (FG)	Seán Sherlock (Lab)	Kevin O'Keeffe (FF)
33rd	2020	Pat Buckley (SF)	David Stanton (FG)	Seán Sherlock (Lab)	James O'Connor (FF)
34th	2024	Pat Buckley (SF)	Noel McCarthy (FG)	Liam Quaide (SD)	James O'Connor (FF)
