= Luke Belton =

Irish politician (1918–2006)

Senator
- In office 13 May 1982 – 25 April 1987
- Constituency: Administrative Panel

Teachta Dála
- In office June 1977 – June 1981
- Constituency: Dublin Finglas
- In office April 1965 – June 1977
- Constituency: Dublin North-Central

Personal details
- Born: 9 August 1918 County Longford, Ireland
- Died: 18 June 2006 (aged 87) County Longford, Ireland
- Party: Fine Gael
- Relatives: Patrick Belton (uncle)

Luke Belton (9 August 1918 – 18 June 2006) was an Irish Fine Gael politician.

A publican from Rathcline, County Longford, he unsuccessfully contested the 1961 general election and was first elected to Dáil Éireann as a Fine Gael Teachta Dála (TD) for the Dublin North-Central constituency at the 1965 general election. He continued to be re-elected for the constituency (renamed Dublin Finglas in 1977) until losing his seat at the 1981 general election when he stood in the Dublin Central constituency. He was again unsuccessful at the February 1982 election and the 1987 general election and then retired from politics.

He was defeated in the Seanad election of 1981, but was elected to the Administrative Panel of the 16th Seanad in early 1982, and re-elected to serve in the 17th Seanad from 1983 to 1987.

He died in 2006, aged 87.

A number of other Belton family members have also served in the Oireachtas

Dáil	Election	Deputy (Party)	Deputy (Party)	Deputy (Party)	Deputy (Party)
13th	1948	Vivion de Valera (FF)	Martin O'Sullivan (Lab)	Patrick McGilligan (FG)	3 seats 1948–1961
14th	1951	Vivion de Valera (FF)	Colm Gallagher (FF)	Patrick McGilligan (FG)	3 seats 1948–1961
15th	1954	Vivion de Valera (FF)	Maureen O'Carroll (Lab)	Patrick McGilligan (FG)	3 seats 1948–1961
16th	1957	Vivion de Valera (FF)	Colm Gallagher (FF)	Patrick McGilligan (FG)	3 seats 1948–1961
16th	1957 by-election	Vivion de Valera (FF)	Frank Sherwin (Ind.)	Patrick McGilligan (FG)	3 seats 1948–1961
17th	1961	Vivion de Valera (FF)	Frank Sherwin (Ind.)	Patrick McGilligan (FG)	Celia Lynch (FF)
18th	1965	Vivion de Valera (FF)	Michael O'Leary (Lab)	Luke Belton (FG)	Celia Lynch (FF)
19th	1969	George Colley (FF)	Michael O'Leary (Lab)	Luke Belton (FG)	Celia Lynch (FF)
20th	1973	George Colley (FF)	Michael O'Leary (Lab)	Luke Belton (FG)	Celia Lynch (FF)
21st	1977	Vincent Brady (FF)	Michael O'Leary (Lab)	Michael Keating (FG)	3 seats 1977–1981
22nd	1981	Vincent Brady (FF)	Charles Haughey (FF)	Noël Browne (SLP)	George Birmingham (FG)
23rd	1982 (Feb)	Vincent Brady (FF)	Charles Haughey (FF)	Richard Bruton (FG)	George Birmingham (FG)
24th	1982 (Nov)	Vincent Brady (FF)	Charles Haughey (FF)	Richard Bruton (FG)	George Birmingham (FG)
25th	1987	Vincent Brady (FF)	Charles Haughey (FF)	Richard Bruton (FG)	George Birmingham (FG)
26th	1989	Vincent Brady (FF)	Charles Haughey (FF)	Richard Bruton (FG)	Ivor Callely (FF)
27th	1992	Seán Haughey (FF)	Derek McDowell (Lab)	Richard Bruton (FG)	Ivor Callely (FF)
28th	1997	Seán Haughey (FF)	Derek McDowell (Lab)	Richard Bruton (FG)	Ivor Callely (FF)
29th	2002	Seán Haughey (FF)	Finian McGrath (Ind.)	Richard Bruton (FG)	Ivor Callely (FF)
30th	2007	Seán Haughey (FF)	Finian McGrath (Ind.)	Richard Bruton (FG)	3 seats from 2007
31st	2011	Aodhán Ó Ríordáin (Lab)	Finian McGrath (Ind.)	Richard Bruton (FG)	3 seats from 2007
32nd	2016	Constituency abolished. See Dublin Bay North			

Dáil	Election	Deputy (Party)	Deputy (Party)	Deputy (Party)
21st	1977	Jim Tunney (FF)	Bertie Ahern (FF)	Luke Belton (FG)
22nd	1981	Constituency abolished		
