= 1979 Cork City by-election =

By-election to the 21st Dáil

- 7 November 1979
- Turnout: 38,657 (55.1%)
	Burke	Dennehy	O'Sullivan
Nominee	Liam Burke	John Dennehy	Toddy O'Sullivan
Party	Fine Gael	Fianna Fáil	Labour
First preferences	12,832	13,890	8,742
Percentage	33.2%	35.9%	22.6%
Final count	19,524	16,210	–
TD before election
Patrick Kerrigan
Labour
TD after election
Liam Burke
Fine Gael

A Dáil by-election was held in the constituency of Cork City in Ireland on Wednesday, 7 November 1979, to fill a vacancy in the 21st Dáil. It followed the death of Labour Teachta Dála (TD) Patrick Kerrigan on 4 July 1979.

The writ of election was moved by Labour TD Barry Desmond on 17 October 1979 and was agreed by the Dáil.

The by-election was won by the Fine Gael candidate Senator Liam Burke. It was held on the same day as the 1979 Cork North-East by-election.

Both by-elections were won by Fine Gael candidates. The victory of Fine Gael in both by-elections contributed to the decision of Jack Lynch to step down as leader of Fianna Fáil and Taoiseach the following month.

== Result ==
1979 Cork City by-election
Party	Candidate	FPv%	Count		
Party	Candidate	FPv%	1	2	3
Fianna Fáil	John Dennehy	35.9	13,890	14,269	16,210
Fine Gael	Liam Burke	33.2	12,832	13,411	19,524
Labour	Toddy O'Sullivan	22.6	8,742	10,444	
Sinn Féin The Workers' Party	Ted Tynan	8.3	3,193		
Electorate: 70,164 Valid: 38,657 Quota: 19,329 Turnout: 55.1%
