= Gus Healy =

Irish politician (1904–1987)

Teachta Dála
- In office June 1969 – June 1977
- Constituency: Cork City South-East
- In office April 1965 – June 1969
- In office March 1957 – October 1961
- Constituency: Cork Borough

Senator
- In office 14 December 1961 – 7 April 1965
- Constituency: Nominated by the Taoiseach

Personal details
- Born: Augustine Anthony Healy; 20 May 1904 Cork, Ireland
- Died: 10 July 1987 (aged 83) Cork, Ireland
- Party: Fianna Fáil
- Spouse: Rita McGrath (m. 1957)

Augustine Anthony Healy (20 May 1904 – 10 July 1987) was an Irish Fianna Fáil politician. A dental laboratory proprietor, Healy was elected to Dáil Éireann as a Fianna Fáil Teachta Dála (TD) for the Cork Borough constituency at the 1957 general election but lost his seat at the 1961 general election, and was instead nominated by the Taoiseach Seán Lemass to the 10th Seanad. Healy regained his Dáil seat at the 1965 general election and, later representing Cork City South-East, retained his seat until retiring at the 1977 general election.

Commonly known Gus Healy, he served as Lord Mayor of Cork from 1964 to 1965 and from 1975 to 1976.

Healy was a keen amateur swimmer and a member of Sunday's Well Swimming Club. He continued to promote the sport during his mayoralty and the city's first suburban swimming pool, opened in Ballinlough in the 1970s, was named the Gus Healy municipal swimming pool.

Civic offices
Preceded by Seán McCarthy	Lord Mayor of Cork; 1964–1965	Succeeded by Cornelius Desmond
Preceded by Pearse Wyse	Lord Mayor of Cork; 1975–1976	Succeeded by Seán French

Dáil	Election	Deputy (Party)	Deputy (Party)	Deputy (Party)	Deputy (Party)	Deputy (Party)
2nd	1921	Liam de Róiste (SF)	Mary MacSwiney (SF)	Donal O'Callaghan (SF)	J. J. Walsh (SF)	4 seats 1921–1923
3rd	1922	Liam de Róiste (PT-SF)	Mary MacSwiney (AT-SF)	Robert Day (Lab)	J. J. Walsh (PT-SF)	4 seats 1921–1923
4th	1923	Richard Beamish (Ind.)	Mary MacSwiney (Rep)	Andrew O'Shaughnessy (Ind.)	J. J. Walsh (CnaG)	Alfred O'Rahilly (CnaG)
4th	1924 by-election	Richard Beamish (Ind.)	Mary MacSwiney (Rep)	Andrew O'Shaughnessy (Ind.)	J. J. Walsh (CnaG)	Michael Egan (CnaG)
5th	1927 (Jun)	John Horgan (NL)	Seán French (FF)	Richard Anthony (Lab)	J. J. Walsh (CnaG)	Barry Egan (CnaG)
6th	1927 (Sep)	W. T. Cosgrave (CnaG)	Seán French (FF)	Richard Anthony (Lab)	Hugo Flinn (FF)	Barry Egan (CnaG)
7th	1932	W. T. Cosgrave (CnaG)	Thomas Dowdall (FF)	Richard Anthony (Ind.)	Hugo Flinn (FF)	William Desmond (CnaG)
8th	1933	W. T. Cosgrave (CnaG)	Thomas Dowdall (FF)	Richard Anthony (Ind.)	Hugo Flinn (FF)	William Desmond (CnaG)
9th	1937	W. T. Cosgrave (FG)	Thomas Dowdall (FF)	Richard Anthony (Ind.)	Hugo Flinn (FF)	4 seats 1937–1948
10th	1938	W. T. Cosgrave (FG)	Thomas Dowdall (FF)	James Hickey (Lab)	Hugo Flinn (FF)	4 seats 1937–1948
11th	1943	W. T. Cosgrave (FG)	Frank Daly (FF)	Richard Anthony (Ind.)	Séamus Fitzgerald (FF)	4 seats 1937–1948
12th	1944	William Dwyer (Ind.)	Frank Daly (FF)	Richard Anthony (Ind.)	Walter Furlong (FF)	4 seats 1937–1948
12th	1946 by-election	Patrick McGrath (FF)	Frank Daly (FF)	Richard Anthony (Ind.)	Walter Furlong (FF)	4 seats 1937–1948
13th	1948	Patrick McGrath (FF)	Michael Sheehan (Ind.)	James Hickey (NLP)	Jack Lynch (FF)	Thomas F. O'Higgins (FG)
14th	1951	Patrick McGrath (FF)	Seán McCarthy (FF)	James Hickey (Lab)	Jack Lynch (FF)	Thomas F. O'Higgins (FG)
14th	1954 by-election	Patrick McGrath (FF)	Seán McCarthy (FF)	James Hickey (Lab)	Jack Lynch (FF)	Stephen Barrett (FG)
15th	1954	Patrick McGrath (FF)	Anthony Barry (FG)	Seán Casey (Lab)	Jack Lynch (FF)	Stephen Barrett (FG)
15th	1956 by-election	John Galvin (FF)	Anthony Barry (FG)	Seán Casey (Lab)	Jack Lynch (FF)	Stephen Barrett (FG)
16th	1957	John Galvin (FF)	Gus Healy (FF)	Seán Casey (Lab)	Jack Lynch (FF)	Stephen Barrett (FG)
17th	1961	John Galvin (FF)	Anthony Barry (FG)	Seán Casey (Lab)	Jack Lynch (FF)	Stephen Barrett (FG)
17th	1964 by-election	Sheila Galvin (FF)	Anthony Barry (FG)	Seán Casey (Lab)	Jack Lynch (FF)	Stephen Barrett (FG)
18th	1965	Gus Healy (FF)	Pearse Wyse (FF)	Seán Casey (Lab)	Jack Lynch (FF)	Stephen Barrett (FG)
18th	1967 by-election	Gus Healy (FF)	Pearse Wyse (FF)	Seán French (FF)	Jack Lynch (FF)	Stephen Barrett (FG)
19th	1969	Constituency abolished. See Cork City North-West and Cork City South-East				

Dáil	Election	Deputy (Party)	Deputy (Party)	Deputy (Party)
19th	1969	Pearse Wyse (FF)	Gus Healy (FF)	Peter Barry (FG)
20th	1973	Pearse Wyse (FF)	Gus Healy (FF)	Peter Barry (FG)
21st	1977	Constituency abolished. See Cork City		
