= Electoral (Amendment) Act 1974 =

Constituencies in use at Dáil elections from 1977 to 1981

Oireachtas
- Long title: AN ACT TO PROVIDE FOR THE NUMBER OF MEMBERS OF DÁIL ÉIREANN AND FOR THE REVISION OF CONSTITUENCIES AND TO AMEND THE LAW RELATING TO THE ELECTION OF SUCH MEMBERS.
- Citation: No. 7 of 1974
- Signed: 7 May 1974
- Commenced: 7 May 1974 & 25 May 1977
- Repealed: 21 May 1981

Legislative history
- Bill citation: No. 3 of 1973
- Introduced by: Minister for Local Government (James Tully)
- Introduced: 28 March 1973

Repeals
- Electoral (Amendment) Act 1969

Repealed by
- Electoral (Amendment) Act 1980
- Status: Repealed

The Electoral (Amendment) Act 1974 (No. 7) was a law in Ireland which revised Dáil constituencies. It was a review of parliamentary constituencies passed in Ireland by the governing Fine Gael–Labour Party National Coalition. It was intended to secure their re-election, but instead backfired disastrously resulting in a landslide victory for their main opponents in Fianna Fáil. Consequently, the word Tullymander – combining the name of the minister James Tully with the word "gerrymander" – was coined.

It repealed the Electoral (Amendment) Act 1969, which had defined constituencies since the 1969 general election.

== Background ==
The responsibility for drawing political boundaries was in the hands of the political parties and this had often been used for partisan advantage. The Minister for Local Government was directly responsible. Minister for Local Government James Tully's 1974 scheme proved to be more ambitious than most. By radically redrawing the boundaries in the Greater Dublin Area, creating a large number of three member constituencies rather than 4 or 5 member constituencies, it was hoped to capitalise on the relative weakness of the main opposition party Fianna Fáil in the capital. The hope was that both Fine Gael and Labour would win one seat each, leaving Fianna Fáil with a solitary seat in each constituency. This plan however relied on the Fianna Fáil vote remaining below the 40% mark in the Dublin area. In the event of it passing that figure, the danger was that Fianna Fáil could win two seats in each constituency even though other parties would have had a combined 60% of the vote. In practice, this is exactly what happened at the 1977 general election and the Tullymander scheme backfired.

A minor aspect of the constituency redrawing concerned the boundary of the constituencies of Meath and Louth. The Meath constituency had seen a population boom in the 1970s, as a result of improved economic performance. Therefore, an extra seat was to be expected. Tully himself was resident in Laytown at the time, and he tried to align the boundary of the Meath constituency so as to get extra votes from nearby expanding Drogheda included in Meath, and thereby bring in a second Labour TD in Meath.

== Aftermath ==
The failure of this partisan scheme led to the creation of an independent Constituency Commission, chaired by a judge, starting with a special commission in 1980 under Justice Brian Walsh. The 1974 Act was repealed by the Electoral (Amendment) Act 1980, which created a new schedule of constituencies first used at the general election for the 22nd Dáil held on 11 June 1981.

From 1997, the Constituency Commission was put on a statutory basis to manage constituency boundary revisions with set terms of reference. An independent commission was constituted after each population census under the chairpersonship of a judge of the High Court or Supreme Court to define constituencies in light of changing demographics.

In 2023, the powers of the Commission were absorbed by the newly established Electoral Commission.

== Summary table of boundary changes ==
1973 constituency	No. of seats	1977 constituency	No. of seats
Carlow–Kilkenny	5	Carlow–Kilkenny	5
Cavan	3	Cavan–Monaghan	5
Monaghan	3	Cavan–Monaghan	5
Clare	3	Clare	3
Clare–South Galway	3	Galway East	4
Galway North-East	3	Galway East	4
Galway West	3	Galway West	4
Cork Mid	4	Cork Mid	5
Cork City North-West	3	Cork City	5
Cork City South-East	3	Cork City	5
Cork North-East	4	Cork North-East	4
Cork South-West	3	Cork South-West	3
Donegal North-East	3	Donegal	5
Donegal–Leitrim	3	Donegal	5
Dublin County North	4	Dublin County North	3
		Dublin County Mid	3
		Dublin County West	3
Dublin County South	3	Dublin County South	3
Dublin North-West	4	Dublin Finglas	3
Dublin North-East	4	Dublin Clontarf	3
		Dublin Artane	3
Dublin North-Central	4	Dublin North-Central	3
Dublin Central	4	Dublin Cabra	3
Dublin South-Central	4	Dublin South-Central	3
Dublin South-West	4	Dublin Rathmines West	3
		Dublin Ballyfermot	3
Dublin South-East	3	Dublin South-East	3
Dún Laoghaire and Rathdown	4	Dún Laoghaire	4
Kerry North	3	Kerry North	3
Kerry South	3	Kerry South	3
Kildare	3	Kildare	3
Laoighis–Offaly	5	Laoighis–Offaly	5
Limerick East	4	Limerick East	4
Limerick West	3	Limerick West	3
Longford–Westmeath	4	Longford–Westmeath	4
Louth	3	Louth	4
Mayo East	3	Mayo East	3
Mayo West	3	Mayo West	3
Meath	3	Meath	3
Roscommon–Leitrim	3	Roscommon–Leitrim	3
Sligo–Leitrim	3	Sligo–Leitrim	4
Tipperary North	3	Tipperary North	3
Tipperary South	4	Tipperary South	3
Waterford	3	Waterford	4
Wexford	4	Wexford	4
Wicklow	3	Wicklow	3

== See also ==
- Elections in the Republic of Ireland
