= Jack Lynch =

Taoiseach (1966–1973, 1977–1979)

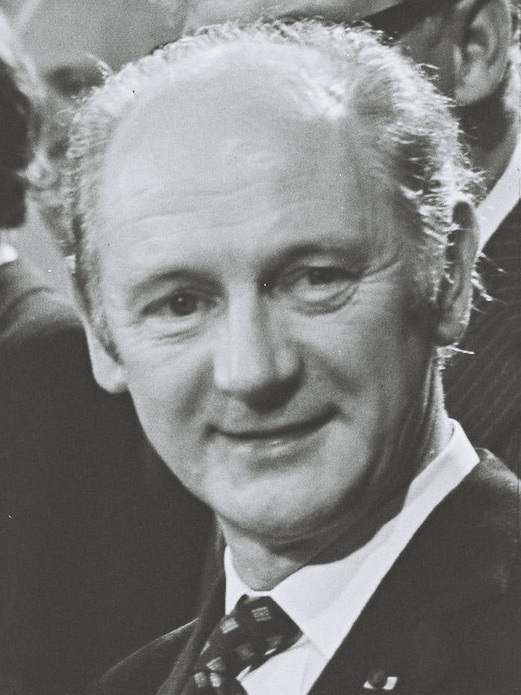
- Lynch in 1972

Taoiseach
- In office 5 July 1977 – 11 December 1979
- President: Patrick Hillery
- Tánaiste: George Colley
- Preceded by: Liam Cosgrave
- Succeeded by: Charles Haughey
- In office 10 November 1966 – 14 March 1973
- President: Éamon de Valera
- Tánaiste: Frank Aiken; Erskine H. Childers
- Preceded by: Seán Lemass
- Succeeded by: Liam Cosgrave

Leader of the Opposition
- In office 14 March 1973 – 5 July 1977
- Taoiseach: Liam Cosgrave
- Preceded by: Liam Cosgrave
- Succeeded by: Garret FitzGerald

Leader of Fianna Fáil
- In office 10 November 1966 – 7 December 1979
- Deputy: Joseph Brennan; George Colley
- Preceded by: Seán Lemass
- Succeeded by: Charles Haughey

Minister for Finance
- In office 21 April 1965 – 10 November 1966
- Taoiseach: Seán Lemass
- Preceded by: James Ryan
- Succeeded by: Charles Haughey

Minister for Industry and Commerce
- In office 23 June 1959 – 21 April 1965
- Taoiseach: Seán Lemass
- Preceded by: Patrick Hillery
- Succeeded by: Charles Haughey

Minister for Education
- In office 20 March 1957 – 23 June 1959
- Taoiseach: Éamon de Valera
- Preceded by: Richard Mulcahy
- Succeeded by: Patrick Hillery

Minister for the Gaeltacht
- In office 20 March 1957 – 26 June 1957
- Taoiseach: Éamon de Valera
- Preceded by: Patrick Lindsay
- Succeeded by: Mícheál Ó Móráin

Parliamentary Secretary
- 1951–1954: Government
- 1951–1954: Lands

Teachta Dála
- In office June 1977 – June 1981
- Constituency: Cork City
- In office June 1969 – June 1977
- Constituency: Cork City North-West
- In office February 1948 – June 1969
- Constituency: Cork Borough

Personal details
- Born: John Mary Lynch; 15 August 1917 Cork, Ireland
- Died: 20 October 1999 (aged 82) Donnybrook, Dublin, Ireland
- Resting place: St. Finbarr's Cemetery, Cork, Ireland
- Party: Fianna Fáil
- Spouse: Máirín O'Connor (m. 1946)
- Education: University College Cork; King's Inns
- Gaelic games career
- Football Position: Midfield
- Hurling Position: Half-back
Clubs
- Years: Club
- 1934–1950; 1934–1951; 1943–1944: Glen Rovers; St Nicholas'; Civil Service
Club titles
	Football	Hurling
Cork titles	2	11
Inter-county
Years	County	Apps (scores)
1936–1950; 1939–1949	Cork (H); Cork (F)	42 (13–66); 14 (1–6)
Inter-county titles
	Football	Hurling
Munster Titles	2	6
All-Ireland Titles	1	5

John Mary Lynch (15 August 1917 – 20 October 1999) was an Irish Fianna Fáil politician who served as Taoiseach from 1966 to 1973 and 1977 to 1979. He was Leader of Fianna Fáil from 1966 to 1979, Leader of the Opposition from 1973 to 1977, Minister for Finance from 1965 to 1966, Minister for Industry and Commerce from 1959 to 1965, Minister for Education 1957 to 1959, Minister for the Gaeltacht from March 1957 to June 1957, Parliamentary Secretary to the Minister for Lands and Parliamentary Secretary to the Government from 1951 to 1954. He served as a Teachta Dála (TD) from 1948 to 1981.

Lynch was the third leader of Fianna Fáil from 1966 until 1979, succeeding Seán Lemass. He was the last party leader to secure (in 1977) an overall majority in the Dáil for his party. Historian and journalist T. Ryle Dwyer called him "the most popular Irish politician since Daniel O'Connell".

Before his political career Lynch had a successful sporting career as a dual player of Gaelic games. He played hurling with his local club Glen Rovers and with the Cork senior inter-county team from 1936 until 1950. Lynch also played Gaelic football with his local club St Nicholas' and with the Cork senior inter-county team from 1936 until 1946.

In a senior inter-county hurling career that lasted for fourteen years, he won five All-Ireland titles, seven Munster titles, three National Hurling League titles and seven Railway Cup titles. In a senior inter-county football career that lasted for ten years, Lynch won one All-Ireland title, two Munster titles and one Railway Cup title. Lynch was later named at midfield on the Hurling Team of the Century and the Hurling Team of the Millennium.

== Early and private life ==
John Mary Lynch was born on 15 August 1917, in Shandon, on the north side of Cork, and grew up in the nearby area of Blackpool. His father Daniel Lynch was a tailor, and his mother Nora (née O'Donoghue) was a seamstress. He was the youngest of five boys and fifth of seven children, with four elder brothers and two younger sisters, Jack, as he was known, was generally regarded as the "wild boy" of the family. He was educated at St. Vincent's Convent on Peacock Lane, and later at the famous "North Mon", the North Monastery Christian Brothers School. When Lynch was just thirteen years old his mother died suddenly. His aunt, who herself had a family of six, stepped in to look after the family. Lynch sat his Leaving Certificate in 1936, after which he moved to Dublin and worked with the Dublin District Milk Board, before returning to Cork to take up a position in the Circuit Court Office.

Lynch began working at the Cork Circuit Court as a clerk at the age of nineteen. His work in the court ignited his interest in law and in 1941 he began a night course at University College Cork studying law, where he was a member of the Law Society. After two years in UCC, he moved once again to Dublin to complete his studies at King's Inns. While continuing his studies he started work with the Department of Justice. In 1945, Lynch was called to the Bar and had to decide whether to remain in his civil service job or practice as a barrister. Lynch made the decision (literally on the toss of a coin) to move back to Cork and began a private practice on the Cork Circuit.

It was in 1943, while on holidays in Glengariff, County Cork, that Lynch met his future wife, Máirín O'Connor, the daughter of a naval doctor killed in World War I. The couple were married three years later on 10 August 1946 and had no children. Although she was apprehensive about her husband's decision to become active in politics, to become a minister and even to become Taoiseach, she stood by him through it all and helped him make the tough decisions that would affect Lynch's life and her own.

== Sporting life ==
From an early age, Lynch showed interest and significant accomplishment as a sportsman. Rugby union, soccer, swimming and handball were all favourite pastimes for Lynch, but it was the sports of Gaelic football and hurling where Lynch showed the most flair.

=== Club ===
Lynch played his club hurling with the famous Glen Rovers club in Blackpool. He enjoyed much success at underage levels, winning back-to-back minor county championship titles in 1933 and in 1934 as captain. That same year Lynch won his first senior county hurling championship with "the Glen". It was the first of a record-breaking eight county titles in a row for Glen Rovers and for Lynch, who served as captain of the side on a number of occasions. He finished off his club hurling career by winning a further three county medals in succession in 1948, 1949 and 1950.

Lynch also played club football with "the Glen's" sister club St. Nicholas. Once again he enjoyed a successful underage career, winning back-to-back county minor titles in 1932 and 1933. Lynch won an intermediate county title in 1937, before adding a senior county football championship medal to his collection in 1938. Lynch won his second county football medal with "St. Nick's" in 1941. While working in Dublin in the mid-1940s, Lynch played club football with the Civil Service GAA team. In 1944 he won a Dublin Senior Football Championship title, alongside fellow Munster native Mick Falvey.

=== Inter-county ===
By the late 1930s, Lynch was a dual player with the Cork senior hurling and senior football teams. In 1939, he became the only player in history to captain both the inter-county football and hurling teams in the same year. That year he won his first Munster Senior Hurling Championship (SHC) title. However, Kilkenny later accounted for Cork in the famous "thunder and lightning" All-Ireland Senior Hurling Championship (SHC) final. In 1940 and 1941, Lynch played as Cork won back-to-back National Hurling League titles, with him captaining the first of those. However, the 1941 championship was severely hampered due to an outbreak of foot-and-mouth disease. Cork only had to play two games to be crowned All-Ireland SHC winner champions. However, the team lost the delayed Munster SHC final to Tipperary.

In 1942, Lynch was selected as Cork hurling captain once again. That year he captured his second set of Munster SHC and All-Ireland SHC medals. The year 1943, proved to be a successful year for Lynch as he won a third Munster SHC medal and a first Munster Senior Football Championship (SFC) medal. While the footballers were later defeated in the All-Ireland Senior Football Championship (SFC) semi-final, Lynch's hurling team went on to win a third consecutive All-Ireland SHC title. In 1944, Lynch captured his fourth Munster SHC title. Later that year Cork created a piece of sporting history by becoming the first team to win four consecutive All-Ireland SHC titles. Lynch was one of the heroes of the team who played in all four finals.

In 1945, Cork surrendered their provincial hurling crown; however, Lynch, as a member of the Cork senior football team, won his second Munster SFC title. Cork later defeated Cavan in the All-Ireland SFC final, giving Lynch his first, and only, All-Ireland SFC medal. In 1946, the Cork hurlers returned to their winning ways and Lynch claimed a fifth provincial hurling title. A fifth All-Ireland SHC medal was later added to his collection following a defeat of old rivals Kilkenny in the final. On that September day in 1946, Lynch made Irish sporting history by becoming the first player to win six consecutive senior All-Ireland medals (five in hurling and one in football).

Lynch captured a sixth Munster SHC medal in 1947, before going on to play in his seventh All-Ireland SHC final in less than a decade. The game itself against Kilkenny has often been described as the greatest All-Ireland SHC final ever played. However, Lynch ended up on the losing side by a single point. There was some consolation at the start of 1948 as Lynch claimed another National Hurling League medal. However, Tipperary quickly became the dominant force in the Munster SHC. Lynch retired from inter-county hurling in 1950. He had retired from inter-county football several years earlier.

=== Honours ===
Even at the height of his career, Lynch had come to be regarded as one of the all-time greats of Gaelic games. His contribution to the game of hurling was first recognised when he was named as the "Hurling Captain of the Forties". In the centenary year of the Gaelic Athletic Association in 1984, Lynch was named on the "Hurling Team of the Century". At the special centenary All-Ireland SHC final in Semple Stadium, he received one of the loudest cheers and rounds of applause when all the former All-Ireland SHC-winning captains were introduced to the crowd. Shortly after his death in 1999, Lynch's reputation as one of the true greats of the game was further cemented when he was named on the "Hurling Team of the Millennium".

In 1981, he won an All-Time All Star Award since there was no All Star Awards during his playing days.

== Political life ==
=== Early career ===
In 1946, Lynch had his first involvement in politics when he was asked by his local Fianna Fáil cumann to stand for the Dáil in a by-election . He declined on this occasion, due to his lack of political experience, but indicated that he would be interested in standing in the next general election. In 1947, Lynch refused a similar offer to stand by the new political party Clann na Poblachta. A general election was eventually called for February 1948, Lynch topped the poll for the Cork Borough constituency and became a Fianna Fáil TD in the 13th Dáil. Although Fianna Fáil lost the election and were out of power for the first time in sixteen years, Lynch became speechwriter and research assistant for the party leader, Éamon de Valera.

In 1951, Fianna Fáil were back in power and Lynch was appointed Parliamentary Secretary to the Government, with special responsibility for Gaeltacht areas. The party returned to opposition again between 1954 and 1957. During this period Lynch served as Fianna Fáil spokesperson on the Gaeltacht. After the 1957 general election Fianna Fáil returned to office and de Valera headed his last government. Lynch was promoted to cabinet as Minister for Education, as well as holding the Gaeltacht portfolio for a short while. At 39, he was the youngest member of the Government. Lynch introduced innovative legislation, such as raising the school leaving age; reducing school class sizes; removing a ban on married women working as teachers and allowing the Jewish skull cap to be worn but only from the age of 12.

=== Minister for Industry and Commerce ===
In 1959, Éamon de Valera was elected President of Ireland and Seán Lemass succeeded him as Taoiseach and Fianna Fáil leader. Lynch was promoted to Lemass' old portfolio as Minister for Industry and Commerce. In this portfolio, he inherited the most dynamic department in the government. However, having replaced such a political giant, Lynch felt that his own scope for change was severely limited. Lynch was described as not being the most innovative of ministers but was particularly attentive when it came to legislation and detail. It was in this department where Lynch worked closely with Lemass and T. K. Whitaker in generating economic growth and implementing the Programme for Economic Expansion. He was also noted for his astuteness in solving several industrial disputes during his tenure at the department.

=== Minister for Finance ===
In 1965, Lemass was once again re-elected Taoiseach. The big change was the retirement of such political heavyweights as James Ryan and Seán MacEntee, with Lynch taking over from the former as Minister for Finance. This appointment was particularly significant because Lemass was coming to the end of his premiership and wanted to prepare a successor. As a result, Lynch took charge of the second most important position in the government, gaining widespread experience in a number of affairs, and accompanying Lemass to London to sign one of the most important trade agreements between Ireland and the United Kingdom. One occasion in which Lynch's authority was seen to be undermined as Minister for Finance was when the Minister for Education, Donogh O'Malley, announced that the government would provide free secondary school education for all. This proposal had not been discussed at Cabinet level as would be required to fund such a service. It subsequently transpired that Lemass had previously agreed the decision without cabinet discussion as was required.

=== Lemass resignation ===
Lemass retired in 1966 after 7 years in the position and a leadership race (the first contested race in the history of the party) threatened to tear Fianna Fáil apart. Lynch, and another favourite of Lemass's, Patrick Hillery, ruled themselves out of the leadership election from the very beginning. However, other candidates such as Charles Haughey, George Colley and Neil Blaney threw their hats into the ring immediately. None of the candidates that were being offered to the party seemed particularly appealing and Lemass' made one last attempt to coax either Hillery or Lynch to join the race as a compromise candidate. Hillery remained adamant that he did not want the leadership and eventually Lynch allowed his name to go forward. Upon hearing this Haughey and Blaney, the latter having never really entered the race in the first place, withdrew and announced their support for Lynch. Colley refused to withdraw and when it was put to a ballot Lynch comfortably defeated him by 52 votes to 19. Lynch was thus elected Taoiseach and leader of Fianna Fáil on 10 November 1966.

The Lynch succession, however, was not a smooth one. Three men had openly expressed ambitions to be Taoiseach, Haughey, Blaney and Colley. Three other cabinet ministers had also contemplated running, these were Brian Lenihan, Kevin Boland and Donogh O'Malley.

== Taoiseach (1966–1973) ==
Because Lynch was elected as somewhat of a "compromise candidate" it appeared to many that he would only remain as an interim Taoiseach. This thought could not be further from his mind, and he outlined his intentions shortly after coming to power. Lynch took particular exception to the title "Interim Taoiseach" or "Reluctant Taoiseach". He had no intention of stepping aside after a few years in favour of one of the other candidates who had been unsuccessful against him in 1966. He was, however, reluctant to name his first cabinet. He believed that the existing members of the government owed their positions to Lemass, and so he retained the entire cabinet, albeit with some members moving to different departments. Lynch adopted a chairman-like approach to government allowing his ministers a free run in their respective departments. He continued the modernising and liberal approach that Lemass had begun, albeit at a slower pace. Lynch was lucky in the timing of Lemass's resignation. The new Taoiseach now had almost a full Dáil term before the next general election.

=== Proportional representation referendum ===
With Fianna Fáil having been in power for eleven years by 1968, Lynch was persuaded once again to make an attempt to abolish the proportional representation method of voting in general elections in favour of a first-past-the-post system that was used in the United Kingdom. However, the campaign generated little enthusiasm, even within Fianna Fáil. The main opposition party Fine Gael, along with the Labour Party opposed the referendum when it transpired that Fianna Fáil could win up to 80 or 90 seats in a 144-seat Dáil if the motion was passed. Much like in 1959, when the party tried to make the same referendum, the electorate believed this to be an attempt to institutionalise Fianna Fáil in power, and thus they rejected the motion put to them. This cast doubts on Lynch and his ability to win a general election, however, he proved his critics wrong in the 1969 general election when Fianna Fáil won its first overall majority since Éamon de Valera in 1957, and Lynch proved himself to be a huge electoral asset for the party.

=== Gaeltacht Civil Rights Movement ===
Gluaiseacht Chearta Sibhialta na Gaeltachta was a pressure group campaigning for social, economic and cultural rights for native-speakers of Irish living in Gaeltacht areas. It was founded in Connemara in 1969 to highlight the decline of the Irish language and to campaign for greater rights for Irish speaking areas in the area of access to services, broadcasting and ultimately an elected assembly of their own.

The campaign was often of a militant nature, including placing nails under the wheels of the car carrying the Taoiseach Jack Lynch in Galway West during the 1969 general election campaign. Campaigners insisted the Taoiseach answer all of their questions before permitting him to continue on his journey. In that election a member of the campaign, Peadar Mac An Iomaire polled more than 6% of the vote in that constituency.

=== Northern Ireland ===
Northern Ireland, and Lynch's attitude to the situation which was about to develop there would come to define his first tenure as Taoiseach. Lynch continued Lemass's approach in regard to relations with Northern Ireland. Better relations had been forged between the two parts of Ireland with cooperation between Ministers on several practical issues such as trade, agriculture and tourism. In December 1967, Lynch travelled to Belfast where he met with Prime Minister Terence O'Neill, for the first time at Stormont. The meeting was arranged in the hope of forming even more links. On 8 January 1968, they met again in Dublin. However, the situation was already beginning to deteriorate in Northern Ireland with civil unrest and the resignation of O'Neill to come. O'Neill continued to hold Lynch in high regard stating in the House of Lords in 1972:

I do not believe one could have a better Taoiseach than Mr. Lynch. It is not for nothing that he is known in the South as "Honest Jack". I do not know many other politicians who have that little prefix put in front of their names.

Shortly after Lynch's election victory in 1969, tensions in Northern Ireland finally spilled over and "The Troubles" began. The sight of refugees from the North teeming across the border turned public opinion in the Republic. The Battle of the Bogside in Derry between the Royal Ulster Constabulary and residents in August 1969, prompted Lynch on 13 August to make what some people consider one of the most important broadcasts to the nation on RTÉ, commenting on the ever-increasingly violent situation he said:

It is clear now that the present situation cannot be allowed to continue. It is evident also that the Stormont government is no longer in control of the situation. Indeed, the present situation is the inevitable outcome of the policies pursued for decades by successive Stormont governments. It is clear also that the Irish Government can no longer stand by and see innocent people injured and perhaps worse. It is obvious that the RUC is no longer accepted as an impartial police force. Neither would the employment of British troops be acceptable nor would they be likely to restore peaceful conditions, certainly not in the long term. The Irish government have, therefore, requested the British government to apply immediately to the United Nations for the urgent dispatch of a Peace-Keeping Force to the Six Counties of Northern Ireland and have instructed the Permanent Representative to the United Nations to inform the Secretary General of this request. We have also asked the British Government to see to it that police attacks on the people of Derry should cease immediately.

Very many people have been injured and some of them seriously. We know that many of these do not wish to be treated in Six County hospitals. We have, therefore, directed the Irish Army authorities to have field hospitals established in County Donegal adjacent to Derry and at other points along the Border where they may be necessary.

Recognising, however, that the re-unification of the national territory can provide the only permanent solution for the problem, it is our intention to request the British Government to enter into early negotiations with the Irish Government to review the present constitutional position of the Six Counties of Northern Ireland.

Lynch's statement that the Irish Government could "no longer stand by" was interpreted by some Unionists in Northern Ireland as hinting at military intervention (and was misquoted as a promise not to "stand idly by"). A minority of ministers – two, according to Desmond O'Malley – would have favoured such a course, but the Irish Army was completely unprepared for an operation of this kind. The majority of the cabinet opposed military intervention, and Lynch took no such action, though he commissioned a study named Exercise Armageddon. As the violence continued, the Minister for External Affairs, Patrick Hillery, met the British Foreign Secretary and also went to the United Nations in a plea to send a peacekeeping force to the North and to highlight the Irish government's case. However, little else was achieved from these meetings other than media coverage of the activities in the north. The situation in Northern Ireland continued to deteriorate during Lynch's first term. Bloody Sunday (30 January 1972), saw the killing of 14 unarmed civilians by British paratroopers and a backlash of anti-British feeling in all parts of Ireland, including the burning of the British Embassy in Dublin.

Despite the strains in relations between the United Kingdom and Ireland in the wake of those events, the British Ambassador, Sir John Peck, praised Lynch, of whom he said "all those concerned with, and committed to, peace with justice in the North owe a very great deal to his courage and tenacity", adding that "I do not think that I ever succeeded in convincing British politicians of how much we owed him at that stage, or what the consequences would have been if he had lost his head".

=== Arms crisis ===
Lynch's attitude towards the Northern Ireland question and the application of Fianna Fáil party policy to it eventually came to define his first period as Taoiseach, and once again showed his critics that far from being "reluctant" he was in fact a strong and decisive leader. His strong leadership skills and determination were clearly evident in 1970, when allegations (later disproved in court, though questions since have emerged challenging that verdict in one case), that the hardline republican Minister for Agriculture, Neil Blaney, and the Minister for Finance, Charles Haughey, were involved in an attempt to use £100,000 in aid money to import arms for the Provisional IRA. Both ministers were sacked after some initial procrastination on Lynch's part, his innocent Minister for Justice, Mícheál Ó Móráin, retired the day before and a fourth minister, Kevin Boland and his Parliamentary Secretary, resigned in sympathy with Haughey and Blaney. The whole affair, which became known as the Arms Crisis, allowed Lynch to stamp his control on his government, but eventually led to deep division in Fianna Fáil for many decades to come. It is now believed by some that Lynch was aware of these activities and acted only when his hand was forced when the Garda Special Branch informed the leader of the opposition and threatened to go to the media.

=== EEC membership ===
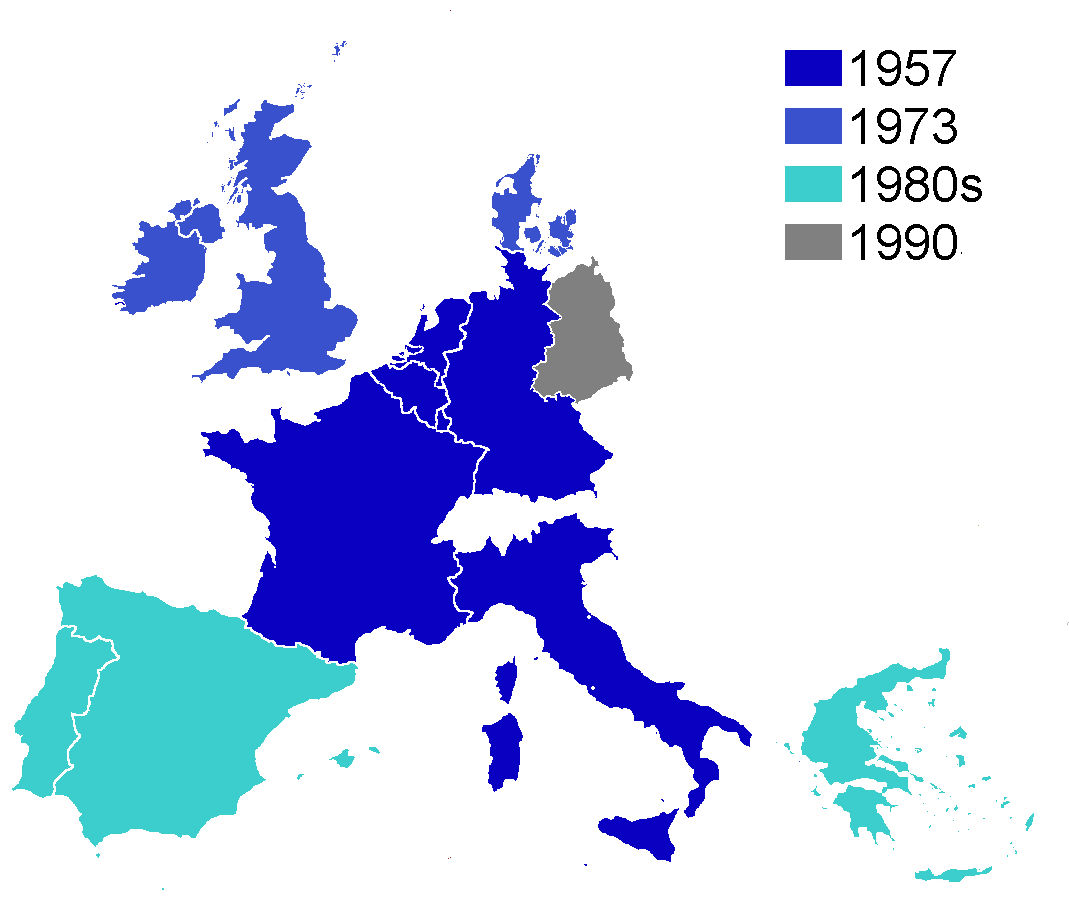
Ireland, along with the United Kingdom and Denmark, joined the EEC in 1973

One of the high points of Lynch's first term as Taoiseach, and possibly one of the most important events in modern Irish history, was Ireland's entry into the European Economic Community. Lynch personally steered the application for membership. Membership was accepted by a five-to-one majority in a referendum. Ireland officially joined, along with its nearest neighbour, the United Kingdom and Denmark, on 1 January 1973. Patrick Hillery became Ireland's first European Commissioner. In appointing Hillery Europe was gaining one of Ireland's most experienced politicians, while on the other hand, Lynch was losing one of his staunchest allies. The admittance of Ireland was the culmination of a decade of preparation which was begun by Lynch and his predecessor, Seán Lemass, who unfortunately did not live to see what would have been his greatest achievement.

=== Social change ===
A number of social initiatives were carried out during Lynch's two periods as Taoiseach, including the introduction of Occupational Injuries Benefit, Retirement Pension, and Deserted Wife's Allowance, and an increase in the single earner's unemployment replacement rate. In 1967, a redundancy payments scheme was introduced, and in 1970, various improvements in welfare provision for women were introduced. Maternity insurance was extended to all female employees, a social insurance benefit for deserted wives was introduced, a means-tested allowance for unmarried mothers was established, and an earnings-related component was added to the basic flat-rate maternity benefit. In 1967, free secondary education was introduced, together with free transport to school "for those living more than three miles from the nearest school". In 1972, entitlement to free travel on public transport was introduced for all persons of pensionable age, while people eligible for free hospital care became entitled to prescription drug reimbursement over a certain amount each month.

== Opposition (1973–1977) ==
Lynch's government was expected to collapse following the Arms Crisis; however, it survived until 1973. Lynch had wanted to call the general election for the end of 1972, however, events had conspired against him and the date was set for February 1973. Lynch's government was defeated by the National Coalition of Fine Gael and the Labour Party at the 1973 general election. Liam Cosgrave was elected Taoiseach and Lynch found himself on the opposition benches for the first time in sixteen years. However, Lynch's popularity remained steadfast, so much so that during his tenure as Leader of the Opposition he was frequently referred to as "the Real Taoiseach."

Lynch had some success while out of power. He had finally gained complete control of the party, having neutralised his rivals for leadership during the Arms Crisis, and initiated Fianna Fáil's electoral comeback by securing the election of its candidate, Erskine H. Childers, as President of Ireland in 1973, defeating the odds-on favourite, the National Coalition's Tom O'Higgins of Fine Gael. In 1974, Lynch appointed Ruairí Brugha as spokesman of Northern Ireland, now seen as not a surprise with that of Fianna Fâil's attitude on cross-border issues.

In 1975, Lynch allowed Charles Haughey to return to his Front Bench as Spokesperson on Health. There was much media criticism of Lynch for this move. In the same year the Foreign Affairs Spokesperson, Michael O'Kennedy, published a Fianna Fáil policy document calling for a withdrawal of British forces from Northern Ireland. The document was an echo of Fianna Fáil's republican origins, and although Lynch was not happy with it, he did not stop it.

Controversy continued to dog the National Coalition when the President of Ireland, Cearbhall Ó Dálaigh, resigned in 1976, after being called a "thundering disgrace" by the Minister for Defence, Paddy Donegan. Taoiseach Liam Cosgrave refused to sack his Minister and the government's popularity took a downturn. A former Fianna Fáil cabinet Minister and a political ally of Lynch, Patrick Hillery, was eventually nominated (without election) as Ó Dálaigh's successor and sixth President of Ireland.

In 1977, the government, although reasonably unpopular, felt sure of an election victory and a June date for the poll was fixed. The National Coalition's spirits had been buoyed up by the actions of the Minister for Local Government, James Tully. In what became known as the Tullymander (a pun on the word gerrymander) he re-drew every constituency in Ireland (as he had authority to do), apparently favouring Fine Gael and Labour Party candidates. However, when the election took place the coalition was swept out of office by Fianna Fáil which won an unprecedented twenty-seat Dáil majority and over 50% of the first preference votes. Lynch himself received the biggest personal vote in the state. Although the large parliamentary majority seemed to restore Lynch as an electoral asset, the fact that the party was returned with an enormous vote allowed Lynch to be undermined by many new TDs who were not loyal to Lynch and wanted him removed.

== 2nd term as Taoiseach (1977–1979) ==
Early on in his second term as Taoiseach, Lynch decided that he would not lead Fianna Fáil into another general election campaign. The date of 7 January 1980 was in his mind as a possible retirement date, however, nothing had been made definite. It was during this time, due to a combination of a large parliamentary majority and the search for a new leader, when party discipline began to break down.

=== The economy ===
In the party's election manifesto in 1977 Fianna Fáil promised a whole range of new economic measures. These measures included the abolition of car tax, rates on houses and a number of other vote-winning "sweeteners". A new Department of Economic Planning and Development was established to kick-start Ireland's flagging economy and to implement these new measures. The government abolished domestic rates on houses and unemployment fell from 106,000 to 90,000 between 1977 and 1979, however, other actions that were taken were not so productive. In 1978, the Irish economy recorded the biggest deficit for an advanced country at 17.6% deficit. The national debt increased by £2 billion in the same period, protest marches by PAYE workers, an increase in electricity charges and the oil crisis of 1979 also caused problems for the government and its economic policy.

=== Party discipline ===
The year 1978 saw the first open revolt in party discipline. There was an open mutiny by many backbenchers when the Minister for Finance, George Colley, attempted to impose a 2% levy on farmers. Although the levy was widely popular with the electorate, Colley was forced into a humiliating climbdown at the behest of the backbenchers and the authority of the government was shaken – particularly when the levy withdrawal was met with mass protests.

Charles Haughey, the Minister for Health, proposed the Health (Family Planning) Bill 1979, which provided for the availability of contraception with a prescription. Jim Gibbons, the Minister for Agriculture, who was a devout Catholic and had a deep hatred of Haughey, failed to attend and vote for this legislation. It was the only time when a TD, let alone a cabinet Minister, was allowed to flout the party whip in Fianna Fáil and damaged Lynch's authority when he failed to dismiss the minister from the government and expel him from the parliamentary party. As well as this, a group of backbench TDs began to lobby other TDs in support of Charles Haughey, should a leadership election arise. This group, known as the "gang of five," consisted of Jackie Fahey, Tom McEllistrim, Seán Doherty, Mark Killilea and Albert Reynolds.

=== Lynch's resignation ===
In June, the first direct elections to the European Parliament took place, with Fianna Fáil polling under 35%. A five-month postal strike also led to deep anger across the country. On 27 August 1979, the Provisional IRA assassinated Lord Mountbatten in County Sligo. On the same day, the IRA killed 18 British soldiers at Warrenpoint in County Down. A radical security review and greater cross-border cooperation were discussed with the new British Prime Minister, Margaret Thatcher. These discussions led Síle de Valera, a backbench TD, to directly challenge the leadership in a speech at the Liam Lynch commemoration at Fermoy, County Cork, on 9 September. Although Lynch quickly tried to impose party discipline, attempting to discipline her for opposing party policy at a parliamentary party meeting held at 28 September, de Valera pointed out that she had not opposed the party policy regarding the North which called for the declaration of the British intent to withdraw from the north. The result was embarrassing for Lynch.

The visit of Pope John Paul II to Ireland in September proved to be a welcome break for Lynch from the day-to-day running of the country. In November, just before Lynch departed on a visit to the United States he decided that he would resign at the end of the year. This would allow him to complete his six-month term as President of the European Community. The defining event which made up his mind was the loss of two by-elections on 7 November by Fianna Fáil in his native Cork (Cork City and Cork North-East). In addition, during the trip, Lynch claimed in an interview with The Washington Post that a five-kilometre air corridor between the border was agreed upon during the meeting with Thatcher to enhance security cooperation. This was something highly unsavoury to many in Fianna Fáil. When Lynch returned he was confronted openly by Síle de Valera, Bill Loughnane, a noted hardline Republican backbencher, along with Tom McEllistrim, a member of Haughey's gang of five, at a parliamentary party meeting. Lynch stated that the British did not have permission to overfly the border. Afterwards, Loughnane went public with the details of the meeting and accused Lynch of deliberately misleading the party. An attempt to remove the whip from Loughnane failed. At this stage, Lynch's position had become untenable, with supporters of Haughey caucusing opinion within the party.

George Colley, the man whom Lynch saw as his successor, went to him and encouraged him to resign sooner. Colley was convinced that he had enough support to defeat the other likely candidate, Charles Haughey, and that Lynch should resign early to catch his opponents off guard. Lynch agreed and resigned as leader of Fianna Fáil on 5 December 1979, assured that Colley had the votes necessary to win. However, Haughey and his supporters had been preparing for months to take over the leadership and Lynch's resignation came as no surprise. He narrowly defeated Colley in the leadership contest and succeeded Lynch as Taoiseach.

Lynch remained in the Dáil as a TD until he retired from politics at the 1981 general election.

== Retirement ==
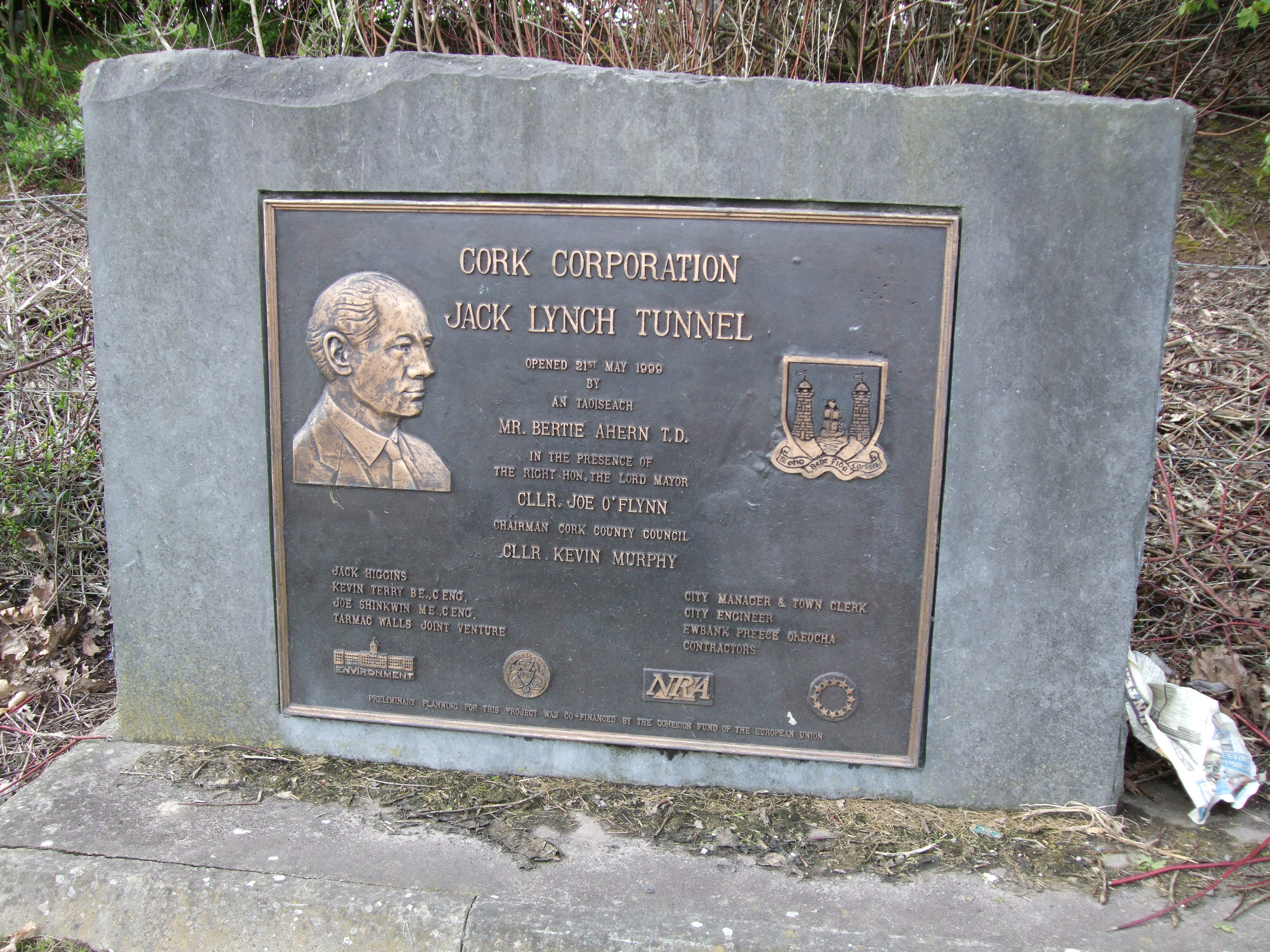
The commemorative plaque for the Jack Lynch Tunnel

Following Lynch's retirement from politics the offers from various companies flooded in. He became a director on the boards of a number of companies, including Irish Distillers, Smurfit and Hibernian Insurance. He also embarked on a good deal of foreign travel. He was conferred with the freedom of his native city of Cork. He continued to speak on political issues, particularly in favour of Desmond O'Malley at the time of his expulsion from Fianna Fáil. Lynch also declined to accept nominations to become President of Ireland, a position he had little interest in. In 1992, he suffered a severe health setback, and in 1993 suffered a stroke in which he nearly lost his sight. Following this he withdrew from public life, preferring to remain at his home with his wife Máirín where he continued to be dogged by ill health.

Lynch continued to be honoured by, among others, the Gaelic Athletic Association and various other organisations. In 1999, the Jack Lynch Tunnel under the river Lee was named by Cork Corporation in his honour. A plaque was also erected at his childhood home in the Blackpool area of Cork, where a statue of him on a bench was erected after his death.

On 20 October 1999, Lynch died in the Royal Hospital, Donnybrook, Dublin at the age of 82. He was honoured with a state funeral which was attended by the President of Ireland Mary McAleese, Taoiseach Bertie Ahern, former Taoisigh John Bruton, Albert Reynolds and Charles Haughey, and various political persons from all parties. The coffin was then flown from Dublin to Cork where a procession through the streets of the city drew some of the biggest crowds in the city's history. After the Requiem Mass celebrated in his home parish of the Cathedral of St Mary and St Anne, Lynch's friend and political ally, Desmond O'Malley, delivered the graveside oration, paying tribute to Lynch's sense of decency. He is buried in St. Finbarr's Cemetery, Cork.

== Legacy ==
Jack Lynch has been described as "the most popular Irish politician since Daniel O'Connell". This praise did not come from Lynch's allies or even his own party, but from the former leader of Fine Gael, Liam Cosgrave, who had succeeded Lynch after his first tenure as Taoiseach. As a sportsman Lynch earned a reputation for decency and fair play, characteristics he brought to political life.

== Governments ==
The following governments were led by Jack Lynch:

- 12th government of Ireland (November 1966 – July 1969)
- 13th government of Ireland (July 1969 – March 1973)
- 15th government of Ireland (July 1977 – December 1979)

== See also ==
- List of people on the postage stamps of Ireland

Political offices
New office	Parliamentary Secretary to the Government; 1951–1954	Succeeded by John O'Donovan
New office	Parliamentary Secretary to the Minister for Lands; 1951–1954	Office abolished
Preceded by Patrick Lindsay	Minister for the Gaeltacht; 1957	Succeeded by Mícheál Ó Móráin
Preceded by Richard Mulcahy	Minister for Education; 1957–1959	Succeeded by Patrick Hillery
Preceded by Seán Lemass	Minister for Industry and Commerce; 1959–1965	Succeeded by Patrick Hillery
Preceded by James Ryan	Minister for Finance; 1965–1966	Succeeded by Charles Haughey
Preceded by Seán Lemass	Taoiseach; 1966–1973	Succeeded by Liam Cosgrave
Preceded by Liam Cosgrave	Leader of the Opposition; 1973–1977	Succeeded by Garret FitzGerald
Preceded by Liam Cosgrave	Taoiseach; 1977–1979	Succeeded by Charles Haughey
Party political offices
Preceded by Seán Lemass	Leader of Fianna Fáil; 1966–1979	Succeeded by Charles Haughey
Gaelic games
Preceded by	Cork Senior Hurling Captain; 1938–1940	Succeeded by Connie Buckley
Preceded by	Cork Senior Football Captain; 1940	Succeeded by
Preceded by Connie Buckley	Cork Senior Hurling Captain; 1942	Succeeded by Mick Kennefick
Achievements
Preceded by Connie Buckley (Cork)	All-Ireland SHC winning captain 1942	Succeeded by Mick Kennefick (Cork)
Preceded by Willie O'Donnell (Munster)	Interprovincial Hurling Final winning captain 1943	Succeeded by Seán Condon (Munster)
Awards
Preceded by Mick Mackey (Limerick)	GAA All-Time All Star Award; 1981	Succeeded by Garrett Howard (Limerick)

Dáil	Election	Deputy (Party)	Deputy (Party)	Deputy (Party)	Deputy (Party)	Deputy (Party)
2nd	1921	Liam de Róiste (SF)	Mary MacSwiney (SF)	Donal O'Callaghan (SF)	J. J. Walsh (SF)	4 seats 1921–1923
3rd	1922	Liam de Róiste (PT-SF)	Mary MacSwiney (AT-SF)	Robert Day (Lab)	J. J. Walsh (PT-SF)	4 seats 1921–1923
4th	1923	Richard Beamish (Ind.)	Mary MacSwiney (Rep)	Andrew O'Shaughnessy (Ind.)	J. J. Walsh (CnaG)	Alfred O'Rahilly (CnaG)
4th	1924 by-election	Richard Beamish (Ind.)	Mary MacSwiney (Rep)	Andrew O'Shaughnessy (Ind.)	J. J. Walsh (CnaG)	Michael Egan (CnaG)
5th	1927 (Jun)	John Horgan (NL)	Seán French (FF)	Richard Anthony (Lab)	J. J. Walsh (CnaG)	Barry Egan (CnaG)
6th	1927 (Sep)	W. T. Cosgrave (CnaG)	Seán French (FF)	Richard Anthony (Lab)	Hugo Flinn (FF)	Barry Egan (CnaG)
7th	1932	W. T. Cosgrave (CnaG)	Thomas Dowdall (FF)	Richard Anthony (Ind.)	Hugo Flinn (FF)	William Desmond (CnaG)
8th	1933	W. T. Cosgrave (CnaG)	Thomas Dowdall (FF)	Richard Anthony (Ind.)	Hugo Flinn (FF)	William Desmond (CnaG)
9th	1937	W. T. Cosgrave (FG)	Thomas Dowdall (FF)	Richard Anthony (Ind.)	Hugo Flinn (FF)	4 seats 1937–1948
10th	1938	W. T. Cosgrave (FG)	Thomas Dowdall (FF)	James Hickey (Lab)	Hugo Flinn (FF)	4 seats 1937–1948
11th	1943	W. T. Cosgrave (FG)	Frank Daly (FF)	Richard Anthony (Ind.)	Séamus Fitzgerald (FF)	4 seats 1937–1948
12th	1944	William Dwyer (Ind.)	Frank Daly (FF)	Richard Anthony (Ind.)	Walter Furlong (FF)	4 seats 1937–1948
12th	1946 by-election	Patrick McGrath (FF)	Frank Daly (FF)	Richard Anthony (Ind.)	Walter Furlong (FF)	4 seats 1937–1948
13th	1948	Patrick McGrath (FF)	Michael Sheehan (Ind.)	James Hickey (NLP)	Jack Lynch (FF)	Thomas F. O'Higgins (FG)
14th	1951	Patrick McGrath (FF)	Seán McCarthy (FF)	James Hickey (Lab)	Jack Lynch (FF)	Thomas F. O'Higgins (FG)
14th	1954 by-election	Patrick McGrath (FF)	Seán McCarthy (FF)	James Hickey (Lab)	Jack Lynch (FF)	Stephen Barrett (FG)
15th	1954	Patrick McGrath (FF)	Anthony Barry (FG)	Seán Casey (Lab)	Jack Lynch (FF)	Stephen Barrett (FG)
15th	1956 by-election	John Galvin (FF)	Anthony Barry (FG)	Seán Casey (Lab)	Jack Lynch (FF)	Stephen Barrett (FG)
16th	1957	John Galvin (FF)	Gus Healy (FF)	Seán Casey (Lab)	Jack Lynch (FF)	Stephen Barrett (FG)
17th	1961	John Galvin (FF)	Anthony Barry (FG)	Seán Casey (Lab)	Jack Lynch (FF)	Stephen Barrett (FG)
17th	1964 by-election	Sheila Galvin (FF)	Anthony Barry (FG)	Seán Casey (Lab)	Jack Lynch (FF)	Stephen Barrett (FG)
18th	1965	Gus Healy (FF)	Pearse Wyse (FF)	Seán Casey (Lab)	Jack Lynch (FF)	Stephen Barrett (FG)
18th	1967 by-election	Gus Healy (FF)	Pearse Wyse (FF)	Seán French (FF)	Jack Lynch (FF)	Stephen Barrett (FG)
19th	1969	Constituency abolished. See Cork City North-West and Cork City South-East				

Dáil	Election	Deputy (Party)	Deputy (Party)	Deputy (Party)
19th	1969	Jack Lynch (FF)	Seán French (FF)	Liam Burke (FG)
20th	1973	Jack Lynch (FF)	Seán French (FF)	Liam Burke (FG)
21st	1977	Constituency abolished. See Cork City		

Dáil	Election	Deputy (Party)	Deputy (Party)	Deputy (Party)	Deputy (Party)	Deputy (Party)
21st	1977	Jack Lynch (FF)	Seán French (FF)	Pearse Wyse (FF)	Patrick Kerrigan (Lab)	Peter Barry (FG)
21st	1979 by-election	Jack Lynch (FF)	Seán French (FF)	Pearse Wyse (FF)	Liam Burke (FG)	Peter Barry (FG)
22nd	1981	Constituency abolished. See Cork North-Central and Cork South-Central				
