= 1977 Irish general election =

Election to the 21st Dáil

- 16 June 1977

148 seats in Dáil Éireann (Note: Including Seán Treacy (Lab), returned automatically for Tipperary South as outgoing Ceann Comhairle, under Art. 16.6 of the Constitution and the Electoral Act 1963, as adapted by the Electoral (Amendment) Act 1974.) 75 seats needed for a majority
- Turnout: 76.3% ▼0.3 pp
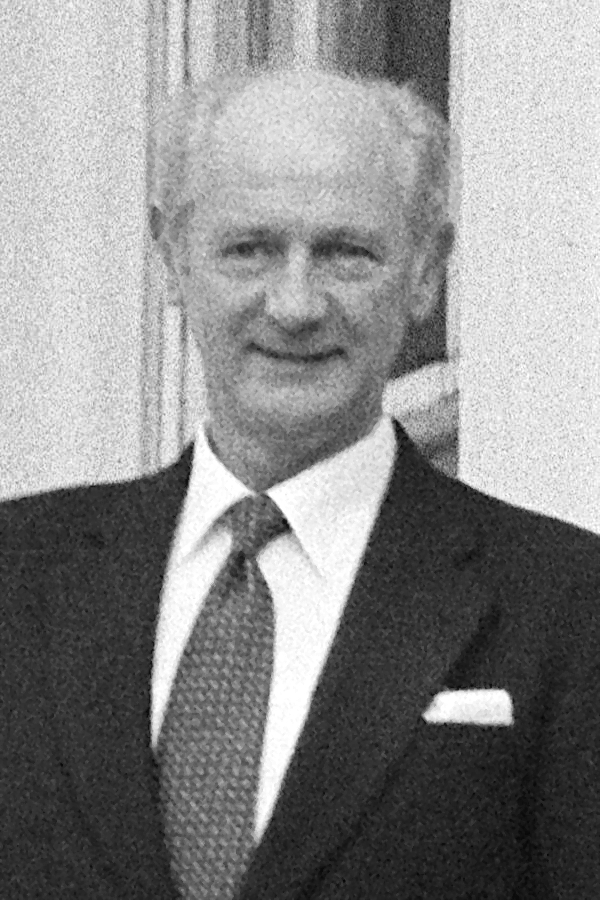

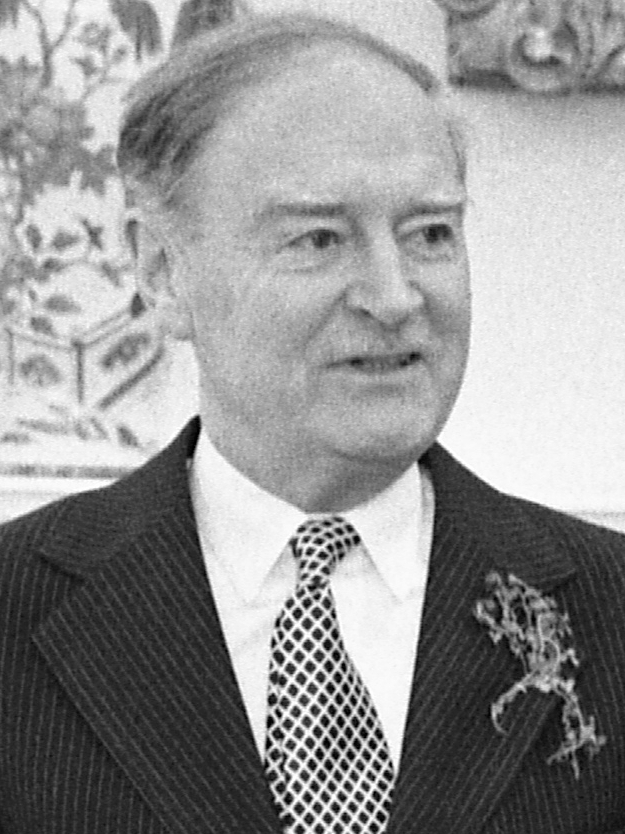

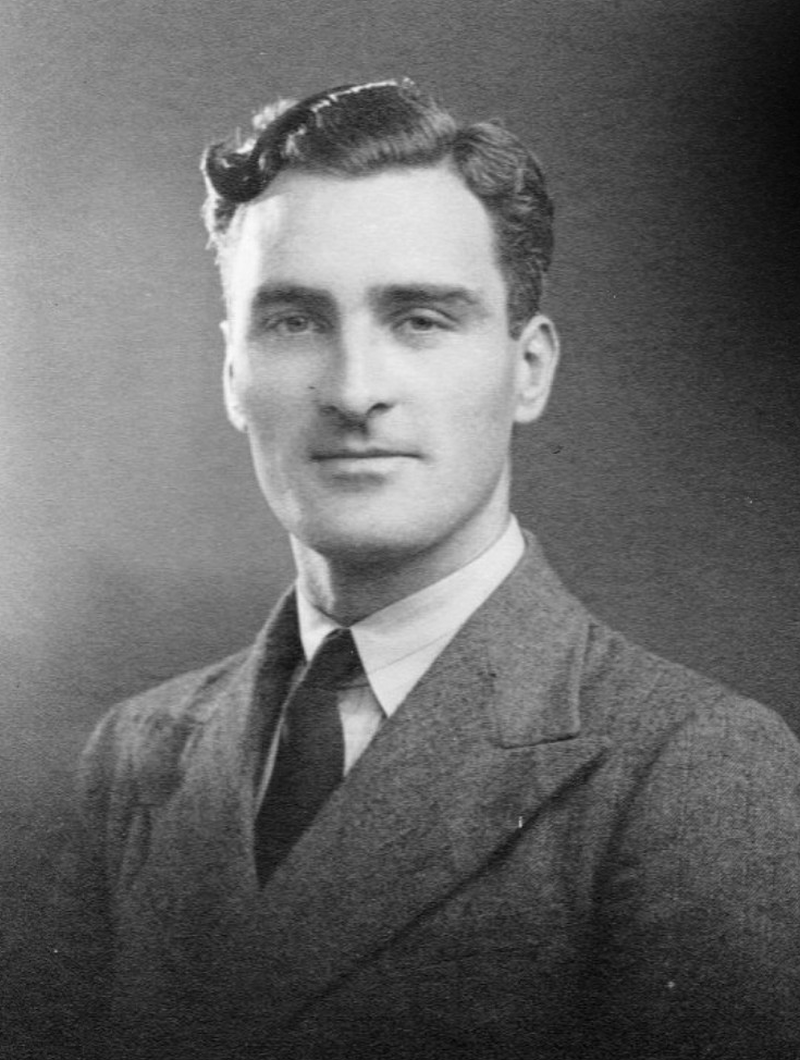
| | First party | Second party | Third party |
|---|---|---|---|
| Leader | Jack Lynch | Liam Cosgrave | Brendan Corish |
| Party | Fianna Fáil | Fine Gael | Labour |
| Alliance | | National Coalition | National Coalition |
| Leader since | 9 November 1966 | 21 April 1965 | 2 March 1960 |
| Leader's seat | Cork City | Dún Laoghaire | Wexford |
| Last election | 69 seats, 46.2% | 54 seats, 35.1% | 19 seats, 13.7% |
| Seats won | 84 | 43 | 17 |
| Seat change | ▲15 | ▼12 | ▼3 |
| Popular vote | 811,615 | 488,767 | 186,410 |
| Percentage | 50.6% | 30.5% | 11.6% |
| Swing | ▲4.4 pp | ▼4.6 pp | ▼2.1 pp |
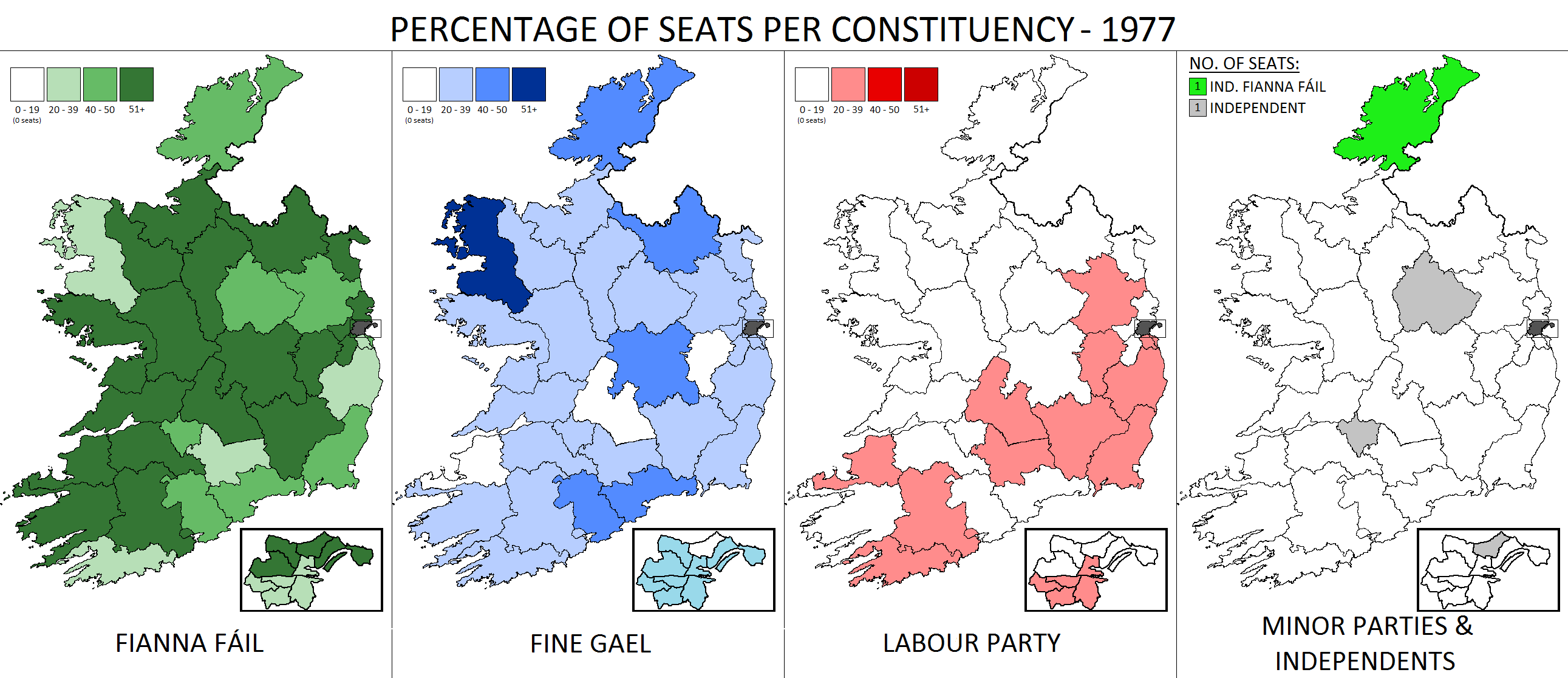
- Percentage of seats gained by each of the three major parties, and number of seats gained by smaller parties and independents.
Taoiseach before election
Liam Cosgrave
Fine Gael
Taoiseach after election
Jack Lynch
Fianna Fáil

The 1977 Irish general election to the 21st Dáil was held on Thursday, 16 June, following the dissolution of the 20th Dáil on 25 May by President Patrick Hillery on the request of Taoiseach Liam Cosgrave. The general election took place in 42 Dáil constituencies throughout Ireland for 148 seats in Dáil Éireann, the house of representatives of the Oireachtas, an increase of four seats. There was a significant revision of constituencies under the Electoral (Amendment) Act 1974. Jack Lynch led Fianna Fáil to a landslide election win, clearly defeating the outgoing Fine Gael–Labour government.

The 21st Dáil met at Leinster House on 5 July to nominate the Taoiseach for appointment by the president and to approve the appointment of a new government of Ireland. Jack Lynch was appointed Taoiseach, forming the 15th government of Ireland, a single-party majority Fianna Fáil government. It was the last election to result in a single-party majority government.

== Campaign ==
In the lead-up to the 1977 general election, the Fine Gael–Labour coalition government was determined to defy political history by securing a second term. Despite facing a range of challenges, including dissatisfaction over economic conditions and rising inflation, the government hoped that the redrawing of constituency boundaries through the Electoral (Amendment) Act 1974 (famously known as the “Tullymander”) would give them an advantage. The scheme, spearheaded by Minister for Local Government James Tully, was designed to maximise the coalition's chances by gerrymandering constituencies, particularly in Dublin where new three-seat constituencies were introduced. The aim was for Fine Gael and Labour to win two of the three seats in these areas, limiting Fianna Fáil to just one. This strategy was also applied in rural areas, where Fine Gael was traditionally stronger than Labour, and was expected to consolidate the coalition's position in power.

As the election campaign progressed, however, it became clear that Fianna Fáil, under the leadership of Jack Lynch, was gaining ground. Though the party was initially not expected to win, Fianna Fáil's campaign took a bold turn with an ambitious manifesto, which promised significant financial and economic "sweeteners" to the electorate. These included the abolition of motor tax and rates on houses, as well as a pledge to reduce unemployment to under 100,000. While these promises would later be criticised for their cost, they resonated strongly with voters in 1977, especially during a time of economic hardship. Before and during the campaign, Both The Irish Times and The Irish Press, which were then edited by Tim Pat Coogan, were extremely critical of the FG–Labour government's curtailment of freedom of speech and in particular of Conor Cruise O'Brien, the Minister for Posts and Telegraphs, who used these restrictions against the Provisional IRA.

The Fianna Fáil campaign was heavily focused on Jack Lynch's personal popularity. His leadership, calm manner, and widespread appeal across the country were central to the campaign's success. The party's director of elections, Séamus Brennan, ran an American-style operation, with Lynch touring the country to rally support. His slogan, "Bring Back Jack", capitalised on his image as a dependable and unifying figure, drawing huge crowds. The campaign was marked by music, rallies, and a strong sense of momentum as Fianna Fáil sought to capitalise on public discontent with the coalition government.

== Result ==
By election day, June 16, 1977, the mood had shifted significantly. Early reports indicated that Fianna Fáil was on track to win, though the full scale of the victory was not immediately apparent. The coalition was left struggling, and the final result saw Fianna Fáil securing 84 seats in the Dáil, a gain of 15 seats and an unprecedented nine-seat majority. This victory marked the most significant electoral win in Irish history up to that point, surpassing even the achievements of Éamon de Valera in his prime. The Fine Gael and Labour parties, in contrast, suffered heavy losses, with Fine Gael losing 12 seats and Labour losing three. The defeat led to the resignation of both Taoiseach Liam Cosgrave and Tánaiste Brendan Corish as leaders of their respective parties, marking a major shift in Ireland's political landscape.

Fianna Fáil’s overwhelming victory was largely attributed to Lynch's personal popularity, the appeal of the party's economic promises, and the effective mobilisation of the electorate. The "Tullymander", designed to secure an advantage for the coalition, ultimately had the opposite effect, contributing to the scale of their defeat. This election would also be the last time any Taoiseach led a single-party government with an overall majority in the Dáil, as Fianna Fáil’s success effectively ended the National Coalition’s tenure in power.

Election to the 21st Dáil – 16 June 1977
| Party | Leader | Seats | ± | % of seats | First pref. votes | % FPv | ±% |
|---|---|---|---|---|---|---|---|
| Fianna Fáil | Jack Lynch | 84 | +15 | 56.8 | 811,615 | 50.6 | +4.4 |
| Fine Gael | Liam Cosgrave | 43 | –11 | 29.0 | 488,767 | 30.5 | –4.6 |
| Labour | Brendan Corish | 17 | –2 | 11.5 | 186,410 | 11.6 | –2.1 |
| Sinn Féin The Workers' Party | Tomás Mac Giolla | 0 | – | 0 | 27,209 | 1.7 | +0.6 |
| Irish Republican Socialist | Seamus Costello | 0 | New | 0 | 955 | 0.1 | – |
| Communist | Michael O'Riordan | 0 | – | 0 | 544 | 0.0 | – |
| Independent | N/A | 4 | +2 | 2.7 | 87,527 | 5.5 | +2.6 |
| Spoilt votes | | | | | 13,743 | —N/a | —N/a |
| Total | | 148 | +4 | 100 | 1,616,770 | 100 | —N/a |
| Electorate/Turnout | | | | | 2,118,606 | 76.3% | —N/a |

Independents include Independent Fianna Fáil (13,824 votes, 1 seat) and the Community group in Dublin (9,427 votes).

=== Voting summary ===
First preference vote
| Fianna Fáil | 50.63% |
| Fine Gael | 30.49% |
| Labour | 11.63% |
| Sinn Féin (Workers' Party) | 1.70% |
| Others | 0.09% |
| Independent | 5.46% |

=== Seats summary ===
Dáil seats
| Fianna Fáil | 56.76% |
| Fine Gael | 29.05% |
| Labour | 11.49% |
| Independent | 2.70% |

== Government formation ==
Fianna Fáil formed a majority government, the 15th government of Ireland, led by Jack Lynch as Taoiseach. In December 1979, Charles Haughey succeeded Lynch as Taoiseach, forming the 16th government of Ireland.

== Membership changes ==
=== First time TDs ===
42 TDs were elected for the first time:

- Bertie Ahern
- Kit Ahern
- Niall Andrews
- Liam Aylward
- John Boland
- Gerard Brady
- Vincent Brady
- Barry Cogan
- Hugh Conaghan
- Michael Joe Cosgrave
- Michael D'Arcy
- Síle de Valera
- Austin Deasy
- Seán Doherty
- Eddie Filgate
- Jim Fitzsimons
- Pádraig Flynn
- Joe Fox
- John Horgan
- Michael Keating
- Seán Keegan
- Patrick Kerrigan
- Timothy Killeen
- Mark Killilea Jnr
- Liam Lawlor
- Eileen Lemass
- Tom Leonard
- Terry Leyden
- Michael Lipper
- John Mannion Jnr
- Charlie McCreevy
- Jim Mitchell
- P. J. Morley
- William O'Brien
- Martin O'Donoghue
- Rory O'Hanlon
- Jim O'Keeffe
- Paddy O'Toole
- Ruairi Quinn
- Albert Reynolds
- Joe Walsh
- Michael Woods

=== Retiring TDs ===
- Gus Healy
- Patrick Smith

=== Defeated TDs ===
- Liam Burke
- Ruairí Brugha
- Justin Keating
- Conor Cruise O'Brien
- Seán Flanagan
- Richard Gogan
- Brigid Hogan-O'Higgins
- Eugene Timmons

== Seanad election ==
The Dáil election was followed by an election to the 14th Seanad.

== See also ==
- Gerrymandering in Ireland
