= 1966 Fianna Fáil leadership election =

Political party leadership election in Ireland

- 9 November 1966
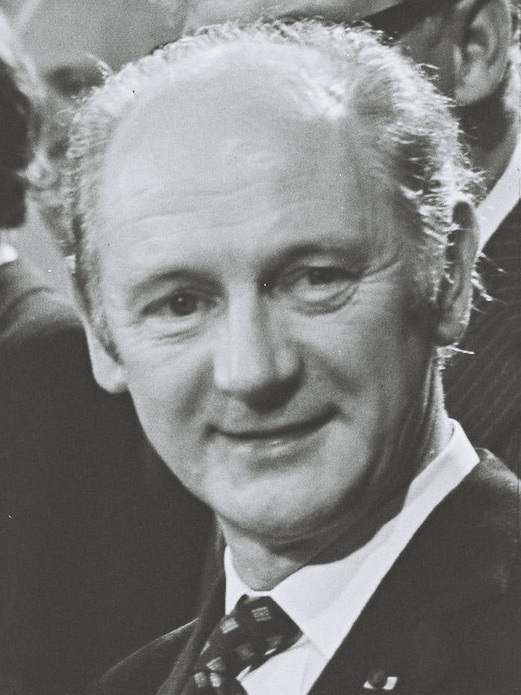

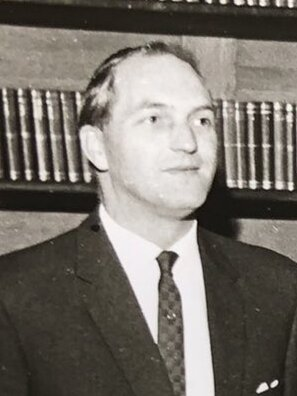
| Candidate | Jack Lynch | George Colley |
| Percentage | 76% | 24% |
Leader before election
Seán Lemass
Elected Leader
Jack Lynch

The 1966 Fianna Fáil leadership election in the Republic of Ireland began in October 1966 following the decision of Seán Lemass to resign as party leader and Taoiseach. Lemass had occupied both posts for over seven years and, while there was no pressure on him to resign, he felt that the time was right to hand over to a new generation. His successor was elected by the members of the Fianna Fáil parliamentary party on 10 November 1966. After one ballot the election was won by Jack Lynch.

== Candidates ==
=== Standing ===
- Jack Lynch, Minister for Finance
- George Colley, Minister for Industry and Commerce

=== Withdrew from election ===
- Charles Haughey, Minister for Agriculture
- Neil Blaney, Minister for Local Government

=== Declined to stand ===
The following prominent Fianna Fáil politicians were speculated upon by media organisations and were even encouraged by Lemass himself to contemplate standing for election:

- Patrick Hillery, Minister for Labour
- Kevin Boland, Minister for Social Welfare
- Brian Lenihan, Minister for Justice
- Donogh O'Malley, Minister for Health

== Campaign ==
In October 1966 Seán Lemass decided to retire as leader of Fianna Fáil and Taoiseach. A number of factors made the decision to retire easier. Firstly he did not want to follow the example of his predecessor, Éamon de Valera, and remain in office too long. Secondly, if he remained as leader, fought another general election and lost he would have the unpalatable task of leaving office as a defeated Taoiseach. Thirdly, and most importantly, the fiftieth anniversary celebrations of the Easter Rising in 1966 marked the end of a particular chapter in Irish history. Lemass, one of the surviving leaders of the Rising, believed that it was time for him, and some of the party's other founding-fathers, to step off the stage of history and hand over to the younger generation.

The two most likely candidates to succeed Lemass were George Colley and Charles Haughey. Both men were out of the country at the time but rushed back to Dublin immediately to stake their claim. While both men were 41 years old and had less than ten years experience as TDs, they were, in reality, like chalk and cheese. Colley, who was the son of party elder Harry Colley, was seen as the representative of the traditional wing of the party, dedicated to its original principles like the Irish language. He had the support of the older members of the party such as Frank Aiken. Haughey, on the other hand was considered a moderniser. The epitome of the "young man in a hurry", he had more support amongst the younger TDs. While a Colley-Haughey election seemed possible at an earlier stage, many members were unhappy about the choice that was on offer.

It was reported that Lemass had already approached Patrick Hillery and Jack Lynch in an attempt to get them to stand, however, they both told him emphatically that they weren't interested. When no other candidate seemed likely to challenge Haughey and Colley, Neil Blaney decided to enter the race with strong support from the republican wing of the party. When it looked like the election could lead to a three-way split in the party, the pressure mounted on Jack Lynch to reverse course and to allow his name to go forward. Lynch was the obvious choice to succeed Lemass. As Minister for Finance he was in charge of the most powerful ministry in the cabinet. He had nearly 20 years Dáil experience and had served in cabinet for nine consecutive years. Apart from his political record Lynch was a national sporting hero, winning All-Ireland medals in hurling and Gaelic football. A group of backbench TDs began a "draft Jack" campaign in the hope that he would stand for the leadership. Lynch also came under pressure from Lemass once again. Facing this pressure he finally decided that he would allow his name to go forward.

== Results ==
Following Lynch's entry into the election, Haughey and Blaney withdrew in support of him. It seemed that Lynch would be unanimously elected as leader, however, Colley refused to withdraw and wanted to push for a vote. At the meeting of the Fianna Fáil parliamentary party on 9 November the following votes were cast:

Election: 9 November 1966
| Candidate | Votes | % |
|---|---|---|
| Jack Lynch | 59 | 76% |
| George Colley | 19 | 24% |
| Turnout | 78 | 100% |
Result: Lynch elected leader

To show that there were no hard feelings Lynch retained Colley in his first Cabinet. Colley in turn gave total loyalty to the new leader, and in time would become his closest ally in cabinet. Jack Lynch, while initially dismissed as a "compromise candidate" and "interim Taoiseach", went on to lead Fianna Fáil for thirteen years. He served as Taoiseach on two occasions; 1966–1973 and 1977–1979.
