= Jim Gibbons (Irish politician) =

Irish politician (1924–1997)

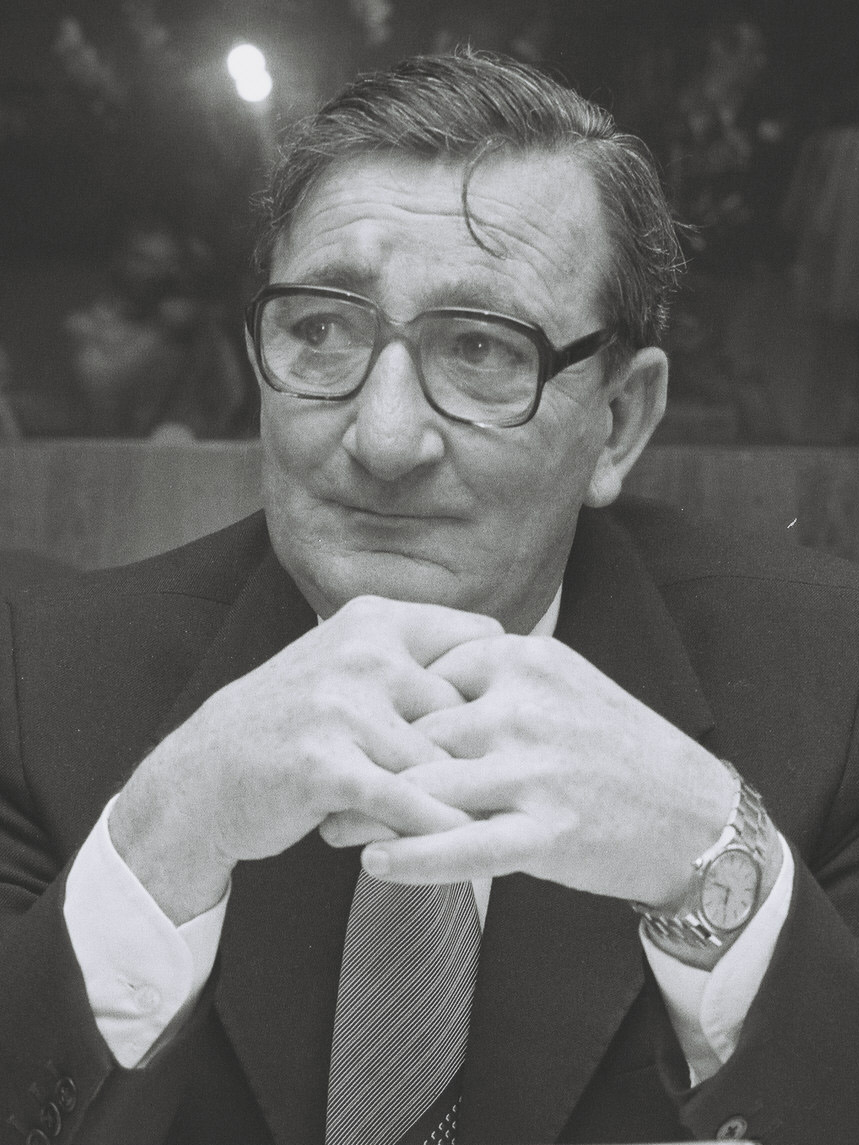
- Gibbons in 1979

Minister for Agriculture
- In office 5 July 1977 – 11 December 1979
- Taoiseach: Jack Lynch
- Preceded by: Mark Clinton
- Succeeded by: Ray MacSharry
- In office 7 May 1970 – 14 March 1973
- Taoiseach: Jack Lynch
- Preceded by: Neil Blaney
- Succeeded by: Mark Clinton

Minister for Defence
- In office 2 July 1969 – 7 May 1970
- Taoiseach: Jack Lynch
- Preceded by: Michael Hilliard
- Succeeded by: Jerry Cronin

Parliamentary Secretary
- 1965–1969: Finance

Teachta Dála
- In office February 1982 – November 1982
- In office March 1957 – June 1981
- Constituency: Carlow–Kilkenny

Member of the European Parliament
- In office 30 January 1973 – 11 June 1977
- Constituency: Oireachtas Delegation

Personal details
- Born: James M. Gibbons; 2 August 1924 Kilkenny, Ireland
- Died: 20 December 1997 (aged 73) Waterford, Ireland
- Party: Fianna Fáil
- Spouse: Margaret O'Neill (m. 1950)
- Children: 11, including Martin and Jim Jnr
- Education: University College Dublin

James M. Gibbons (2 August 1924 – 20 December 1997) was an Irish Fianna Fáil politician who served as Minister for Agriculture from 1970 to 1973 and 1977 to 1979, Minister for Defence from 1969 to 1970 and Parliamentary Secretary to the Minister for Finance from 1965 to 1969. He served as a Teachta Dála (TD) for the Carlow–Kilkenny constituency from 1957 to 1981 and February 1982 to November 1982. He also served as a Member of the European Parliament (MEP) from 1973 to 1977.

== Early life ==
Gibbons was born in Bonnettsrath, County Kilkenny, the son of Martin Gibbons, a local farmer, and his wife Agnes (née Bowe). Gibbons was born into a political family. His uncle Seán Gibbons was elected to Dáil Éireann as a Cumann na nGaedheal candidate at the 1923 general election, but later joined the Farmer's Party and eventually joined Fianna Fáil.

Gibbons was educated locally and later attended Kilkenny CBS and St Kieran's College. Here, he earned a reputation on the sports field, winning a Leinster colleges' hurling title. Following the completion of his Leaving Certificate he studied medicine at University College Dublin, however, he abandoned his studies after two years to return to Kilkenny where he concentrated on farming. Gibbons later bought a 300-acre farm at the Pheasantgry, Dunmore, about four miles from Kilkenny.

== Political career ==
Gibbons was politically active from an early age, having joined Fianna Fáil in his youth. He was co-opted onto Kilkenny County Council in 1954, and secured election to that authority in his own right the following year. He remained as a county councillor until 1967.

Gibbons was elected to Dáil Éireann for the Carlow–Kilkenny constituency at the 1957 general election. He secured re-election at the 1961 general election, however, he remained on the government backbenches for a second term.

Following the 1965 general election, Gibbons secured promotion to the junior ministerial ranks under Seán Lemass, when he was appointed Parliamentary Secretary to the Minister for Finance. In this position he served under Jack Lynch and later under Charles Haughey.

=== Minister for Defence (1969–1970) ===
Following Fianna Fáil's fourth general election triumph in succession at the 1969 general election, Gibbons joined Jack Lynch's cabinet as Minister for Defence. His short tenure in the role would come to define his political career. In August 1969, civil unrest in Northern Ireland boiled over and the Irish government were forced to act. Lynch urged his cabinet to take a cautious line and established a cabinet subcommittee to organise emergency assistance and relief. A government fund of £100,000 was set up to provide relief to nationalist civilians forced out of their homes by the Troubles, and Charles Haughey, as Minister for Finance, was given sole authority over this money. The Minister for Agriculture, Neil Blaney, allegedly made plans with Captain James Kelly to import weapons from continental Europe. Haughey provided the money for the purchase from his civilian relief fund, and also tried to arrange customs clearance for the shipment.

In May 1970, the Arms Crisis broke when Haughey and Blaney were sacked by Lynch when the plot to import arms was revealed. At the subsequent Arms Trial Gibbons would be the chief prosecution witness and his evidence would contradict Haughey's. Haughey was found not guilty, therefore Gibbons was implied to have been dishonest, an allegation that affected him deeply. He was never charged with any offence himself and was angry that a Dáil motion of confidence in the government effectively turned into a debate about him personally.

=== Minister for Agriculture and Fisheries (1970–1973) ===
In the wake of the Arms Crisis and the ministerial sackings, Gibbons was appointed as Minister for Agriculture and Fisheries. As a farmer, he was respected and liked by the farming community and its representatives. In his new role Gibbons played a key role in the agricultural negotiations concerning entry into the European Economic Community and in the amalgamation of creameries in the country.

=== In opposition (1973–1977) ===
Fianna Fáil lost office to a Fine Gael–Labour Party coalition following the 1973 general election. He remained a key member of Jack Lynch's team. Shortly after the general election, he was appointed a member of the second delegation from the Oireachtas to the European Parliament. In 1975 Gibbons was appointed to Jack Lynch's new front bench as Spokesperson on Agriculture. Charles Haughey, with whom he had clashed in the Arms Crisis, also re-joined the front bench.

=== Minister for Agriculture (1977–1979) ===
Following Fianna Fáil's huge triumph at the 1977 general election, Gibbons's tenure as an MEP ended and he returned to Jack Lynch's new cabinet as Minister for Agriculture. Once again his appointment was welcomed by farmers.

In 1979, Gibbons clashed with Charles Haughey, the Minister for Health, over the Family Planning Bill. As a devout Catholic, Gibbons voted against the bill that legalised the sale of contraceptives. Taoiseach, Jack Lynch, took no action against him. This action only exacerbated the ill-feeling between Gibbons and Haughey.

In December 1979, Jack Lynch announced his resignation as Taoiseach and Fianna Fáil leader. The subsequent leadership election was a contest between Haughey and George Colley. The latter had the backing of almost every member of the cabinet; however, a backbench revolt saw Haughey narrowly become Taoiseach and party leader.

In the resulting cabinet reshuffle Gibbons and Bobby Molloy lost their ministerial positions, as Haughey promoted backbenchers who had supported him.

=== Later political career ===
Following his departure from cabinet, Gibbons became a vocal critic of Haughey's leadership of Fianna Fáil. After he lost his seat at the 1981 general election he openly called for a change of leadership within the party.

Gibbons regained his seat at the February 1982 general election and voted against Haughey in the leadership challenge that was proposed by Charlie McCreevy. Leaving Leinster House after the vote he was attacked by a number of Fianna Fáil supporters and forced to the ground. A friend of his saw off the attackers. In the aftermath, new swivel doors were erected to prevent mobs pushing their way into the parliament building. The incident was recounted by Desmond O'Malley in the RTÉ documentary series Seven Ages (although O'Malley does not mention Gibbons by name), and was later also referred to in the 2005 RTÉ biographical series Haughey.

A few weeks after this incident Gibbons suffered a heart attack and was unable to vote for Haughey later that year in a no-confidence motion at which point the government fell. He lost his seat at the November 1982 general election and effectively retired from politics.

== Retirement ==
In retirement Gibbons suffered from ill health and suffered a number of heart attacks and strokes. He never fully recovered from the physical assault on him outside the Dáil in 1982.

In 1986, Gibbons offered his support to Desmond O'Malley and the new Progressive Democrats, as he believed that there was no longer a place for him within Haughey's Fianna Fáil party. His son Martin Gibbons was elected to the Dáil for the new party in the 1987 general election. In 1997 another son, Jim Gibbons Jnr, was nominated by the Taoiseach Bertie Ahern as a member of the 21st Seanad.

== Death ==
Jim Gibbons died on 20 December 1997 aged 73. He had married Margaret (Peg) O'Neill in 1950, and they had five sons and six daughters.

== See also ==
- Families in the Oireachtas

Political offices
| Preceded by Donogh O'Malley | Parliamentary Secretary to the Minister for Finance; 1965–1969 | Succeeded by Noel Lemass |
| Preceded by Michael Hilliard | Minister for Defence; 1969–1970 | Succeeded by Jerry Cronin |
| Preceded by Neil Blaney | Minister for Agriculture and Fisheries; 1970–1973 | Succeeded by Mark Clinton |
| Preceded by Mark Clinton | Minister for Agriculture; 1977–1979 | Succeeded by Ray MacSharry |

| Dáil | Election | Deputy (Party) | Deputy (Party) | Deputy (Party) | Deputy (Party) | Deputy (Party) |
|---|---|---|---|---|---|---|
| 2nd | 1921 | Edward Aylward (SF) | W. T. Cosgrave (SF) | James Lennon (SF) | Gearóid O'Sullivan (SF) | 4 seats 1921–1923 |
| 3rd | 1922 | Patrick Gaffney (Lab) | W. T. Cosgrave (PT-SF) | Denis Gorey (FP) | Gearóid O'Sullivan (PT-SF) | 4 seats 1921–1923 |
| 4th | 1923 | Edward Doyle (Lab) | W. T. Cosgrave (CnaG) | Denis Gorey (FP) | Michael Shelly (Rep) | Seán Gibbons (CnaG) |
| 4th | 1925 by-election | Edward Doyle (Lab) | W. T. Cosgrave (CnaG) | Denis Gorey (FP) | Michael Shelly (Rep) | Thomas Bolger (CnaG) |
| 5th | 1927 (Jun) | Edward Doyle (Lab) | W. T. Cosgrave (CnaG) | Denis Gorey (CnaG) | Thomas Derrig (FF) | Richard Holohan (FP) |
| 6th | 1927 (Sep) | Edward Doyle (Lab) | W. T. Cosgrave (CnaG) | Peter de Loughry (CnaG) | Thomas Derrig (FF) | Richard Holohan (FP) |
| 6th | 1927 by-election | Edward Doyle (Lab) | Denis Gorey (CnaG) | Peter de Loughry (CnaG) | Thomas Derrig (FF) | Richard Holohan (FP) |
| 7th | 1932 | Francis Humphreys (FF) | Denis Gorey (CnaG) | Desmond FitzGerald (CnaG) | Thomas Derrig (FF) | Seán Gibbons (FF) |
| 8th | 1933 | James Pattison (Lab) | Richard Holohan (NCP) | Desmond FitzGerald (CnaG) | Thomas Derrig (FF) | Seán Gibbons (FF) |
| 9th | 1937 | Constituency abolished. See Kilkenny and Carlow–Kildare | | | | |

| Dáil | Election | Deputy (Party) | Deputy (Party) | Deputy (Party) | Deputy (Party) | Deputy (Party) |
|---|---|---|---|---|---|---|
| 13th | 1948 | James Pattison (NLP) | Thomas Walsh (FF) | Thomas Derrig (FF) | Joseph Hughes (FG) | Patrick Crotty (FG) |
| 14th | 1951 | Francis Humphreys (FF) | Thomas Walsh (FF) | Thomas Derrig (FF) | Joseph Hughes (FG) | Patrick Crotty (FG) |
| 15th | 1954 | James Pattison (Lab) | Thomas Walsh (FF) | Thomas Derrig (FF) | Joseph Hughes (FG) | Patrick Crotty (FG) |
| 15th | 1956 by-election | James Pattison (Lab) | Martin Medlar (FF) | Thomas Derrig (FF) | Joseph Hughes (FG) | Patrick Crotty (FG) |
| 16th | 1957 | Francis Humphreys (FF) | Martin Medlar (FF) | Jim Gibbons (FF) | Joseph Hughes (FG) | Patrick Crotty (FG) |
| 16th | 1960 by-election | Patrick Teehan (FF) | Martin Medlar (FF) | Jim Gibbons (FF) | Joseph Hughes (FG) | Patrick Crotty (FG) |
| 17th | 1961 | Séamus Pattison (Lab) | Martin Medlar (FF) | Jim Gibbons (FF) | Desmond Governey (FG) | Patrick Crotty (FG) |
| 18th | 1965 | Séamus Pattison (Lab) | Tom Nolan (FF) | Jim Gibbons (FF) | Desmond Governey (FG) | Patrick Crotty (FG) |
| 19th | 1969 | Séamus Pattison (Lab) | Tom Nolan (FF) | Jim Gibbons (FF) | Desmond Governey (FG) | Kieran Crotty (FG) |
| 20th | 1973 | Séamus Pattison (Lab) | Tom Nolan (FF) | Jim Gibbons (FF) | Desmond Governey (FG) | Kieran Crotty (FG) |
| 21st | 1977 | Séamus Pattison (Lab) | Tom Nolan (FF) | Jim Gibbons (FF) | Liam Aylward (FF) | Kieran Crotty (FG) |
| 22nd | 1981 | Séamus Pattison (Lab) | Tom Nolan (FF) | Desmond Governey (FG) | Liam Aylward (FF) | Kieran Crotty (FG) |
| 23rd | 1982 (Feb) | Séamus Pattison (Lab) | Jim Gibbons (FF) | Desmond Governey (FG) | Liam Aylward (FF) | Kieran Crotty (FG) |
| 24th | 1982 (Nov) | Séamus Pattison (Lab) | M. J. Nolan (FF) | Dick Dowling (FG) | Liam Aylward (FF) | Kieran Crotty (FG) |
| 25th | 1987 | Séamus Pattison (Lab) | M. J. Nolan (FF) | Martin Gibbons (PDs) | Liam Aylward (FF) | Kieran Crotty (FG) |
| 26th | 1989 | Séamus Pattison (Lab) | M. J. Nolan (FF) | Phil Hogan (FG) | Liam Aylward (FF) | John Browne (FG) |
| 27th | 1992 | Séamus Pattison (Lab) | M. J. Nolan (FF) | Phil Hogan (FG) | Liam Aylward (FF) | John Browne (FG) |
| 28th | 1997 | Séamus Pattison (Lab) | John McGuinness (FF) | Phil Hogan (FG) | Liam Aylward (FF) | John Browne (FG) |
| 29th | 2002 | Séamus Pattison (Lab) | John McGuinness (FF) | Phil Hogan (FG) | Liam Aylward (FF) | M. J. Nolan (FF) |
| 30th | 2007 | Mary White (GP) | John McGuinness (FF) | Phil Hogan (FG) | Bobby Aylward (FF) | M. J. Nolan (FF) |
| 31st | 2011 | Ann Phelan (Lab) | John McGuinness (FF) | Phil Hogan (FG) | John Paul Phelan (FG) | Pat Deering (FG) |
| 31st | 2015 by-election | Ann Phelan (Lab) | John McGuinness (FF) | Bobby Aylward (FF) | John Paul Phelan (FG) | Pat Deering (FG) |
| 32nd | 2016 | Kathleen Funchion (SF) | John McGuinness (FF) | Bobby Aylward (FF) | John Paul Phelan (FG) | Pat Deering (FG) |
| 33rd | 2020 | Kathleen Funchion (SF) | John McGuinness (FF) | Jennifer Murnane O'Connor (FF) | John Paul Phelan (FG) | Malcolm Noonan (GP) |
| 34th | 2024 | Natasha Newsome Drennan (SF) | John McGuinness (FF) | Jennifer Murnane O'Connor (FF) | Catherine Callaghan (FG) | Peter "Chap" Cleere (FF) |
