= Desmond O'Malley =

Irish politician (1939–2021)

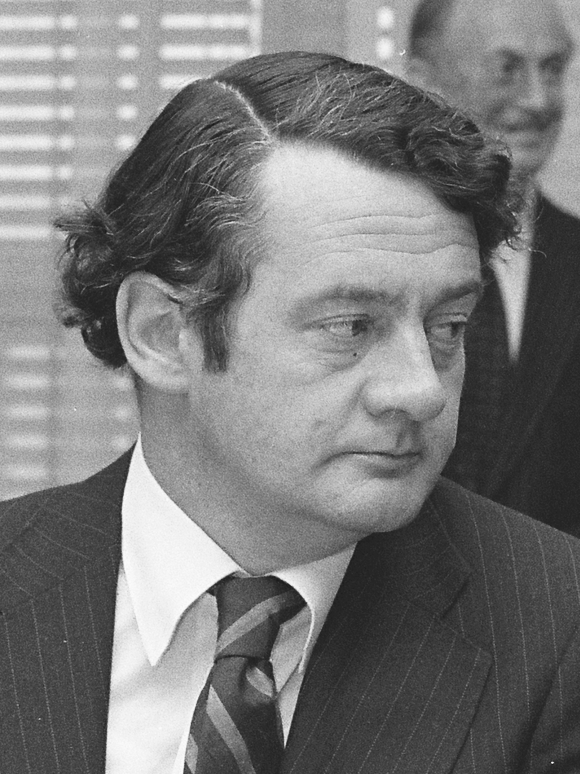
- O'Malley in 1979

Leader of the Progressive Democrats
- In office 21 December 1985 – 12 October 1993
- Deputy: Michael Keating; Pearse Wyse
- Preceded by: New position
- Succeeded by: Mary Harney

Minister for Industry and Commerce
- In office 12 July 1989 – 4 November 1992
- Taoiseach: Charles Haughey; Albert Reynolds
- Preceded by: Ray Burke
- Succeeded by: Pádraig Flynn
- In office 5 July 1977 – 30 June 1981
- Taoiseach: Jack Lynch; Charles Haughey
- Preceded by: Justin Keating
- Succeeded by: John Kelly

Minister for Trade, Commerce and Tourism
- In office 9 March 1982 – 7 October 1982
- Taoiseach: Charles Haughey
- Preceded by: John Kelly
- Succeeded by: Paddy Power

Minister for Justice
- In office 5 May 1970 – 14 March 1973
- Taoiseach: Jack Lynch
- Preceded by: Mícheál Ó Móráin
- Succeeded by: Patrick Cooney

Parliamentary Secretary
- 1969–1970: Government Chief Whip
- 1969–1970: Defence

Teachta Dála
- In office May 1968 – May 2002
- Constituency: Limerick East

Personal details
- Born: 2 February 1939 Limerick, Ireland
- Died: 21 July 2021 (aged 82) Dublin, Ireland
- Party: Independent
- Other political affiliations: Fianna Fáil (1968–1985); Progressive Democrats (1985–2002)
- Spouse: Pat O'Malley (m. 1964; died 2017)
- Relations: Donogh O'Malley (Uncle); Tim O'Malley (cousin); Daragh O'Malley (cousin); Patrick O'Malley (cousin)
- Children: 6, including Fiona
- Education: University College Dublin

Desmond Joseph O'Malley (2 February 1939 – 21 July 2021) was an Irish politician who served as Minister for Industry and Commerce from 1977 to 1981 and 1989 to 1992, leader of the Progressive Democrats from 1985 to 1993, Minister for Trade, Commerce and Tourism from March 1982 to October 1982, Minister for Justice from 1970 to 1973 and Government Chief Whip and Parliamentary Secretary to the Minister of Defence from 1969 to 1970. He served as a TD for Limerick East from 1968 to 2002.

A prominent Fianna Fáil member and government minister in the 1970s and 1980s, O'Malley was expelled from the party in 1985. He founded the Progressive Democrats and served as the party's first leader from 1985 until 1993. He retired from politics at the 2002 general election.

== Early life ==
O'Malley was born in Limerick in 1939. His family had long been involved in politics: His maternal grandfather, Denis O'Donovan, was killed during the War of Independence by the Black and Tans, two of his uncles and his father held the office of Mayor of Limerick, and his uncle Donogh O'Malley was a Minister for Education.

O'Malley was educated at the Jesuit Crescent College and at University College Dublin, from which he graduated with a degree in law in 1962.

He was married to Pat McAleer, who predeceased him in 2017. They had six children, 4 daughters and two sons, including Fiona O'Malley.

== Entering politics ==
In 1968, his uncle and sitting TD Donogh O'Malley died suddenly. Initially, Donogh's widow Hilda was asked by Fianna Fáil to stand in the coming by-election to try and retain the seat for the party. However, as Hilda was still in shock because of her husband's sudden death she declined and instead, after a canvass of many O'Malleys, Desmond O'Malley was selected and he stood in the subsequent by-election to fill the vacant seat. Desmond was successful and was elected to Dáil Éireann as a Fianna Fáil TD for Limerick East. At the time it was believed that this by-election victory by just 900 votes was partly due to Neil Blaney and his "Donegal Mafia". Blaney would subsequently deeply regret aiding O'Malley in his election as he always felt that Des was in the wrong party.

The relationship between Desmond and Hilda was strained following Desmond's victory after Hilda had a change of heart about entering politics. She requested that Desmond stand aside in the 1969 general election in favour of her becoming the main Fianna Fáil candidate, but Desmond refused. Both Desmond and Hilda stood in Limerick East in that 1969 Election, with Desmond for Fianna Fáil and Hilda as an independent. Desmond came third while Hilda finished fifth in the four-seat constituency. Desmond was elected while Hilda just missed out. The "O'Malley vs O'Malley" dynamic of what was a very acrimonious contest drew enormous interest and discussion, to the point of attracting international headlines.

== Arms Crisis and Minister for Justice ==
After the 1969 general election, O'Malley was appointed Parliamentary Secretary to the Taoiseach, Jack Lynch, and Parliamentary Secretary to the Minister for Defence, Jim Gibbons. O'Malley had a central role in the case for the prosecution against the government ministers Charles Haughey and Neil Blaney that arose from the Arms Crisis of 1970. Both ministers were acquitted in a trial at the Central Criminal Court.

It has been alleged by numerous scholars that O'Malley was aware of alleged efforts by Taoiseach Jack Lynch's efforts to procure arms for northern Nationalists, to be kept under lock and key at a secure location at a monastery in County Cavan, and the training of young men, hand-picked by the Citizens' Defence Committees to be instructed in their use by the Irish Defence Forces. This is subject to much controversy and there is no agreement for this.

It has been further alleged that O'Malley was aware of a ministerial memo that stated:

The Taoiseach and other Ministers have met delegations from the North. At these meetings urgent demands were made for respirators, weapons and ammunition the provision of which the Government agreed. Accordingly truckloads of these items will be put at readiness so that they may be available in a matter of hours

A transport of army trucks with 500 rifles, 80,000 rounds of ammunition and respirators was indeed sent to the North but did not cross the border, in April 1970 (following orders Defence Minister Gibbons issued in February of that year), instead the trucks were parked at Aitken barracks in Dundalk. Owing to a lack of sufficient space, all but 150 rifles were returned south immediately, and the remainder in May 1970, ostensibly due to a fear the barracks could be raided by the IRA. As O'Malley was a junior minister in the Department of Defence, it is highly unlikely that he was not aware of the relevant handwritten memo suggesting their removal from Aitken Barracks. This memo, as with the one above, was not admitted as evidence at the Arms Trial, perhaps because it might have aroused suspicion as to the Irish Department of Defence's intentions in moving so many weapons and for what purpose. It has been suggested that the arms were to be temporarily stored there whilst Captain James Kelly procured the intended weapons from Germany, under instruction from the Defence Minister, Jim Gibbons and the Army Director of Intelligence, Colonel Michael Hefferon.

Following intelligence reports of the possibility of a raid by a subversive organisation in Dundalk military barracks, the balance of 150 rifles and 80,000 rounds of ammunition stored in Dundalk, were returned to stores in Dublin on Fri 1 May 1970.

In 1970, O'Malley succeeded Mícheál Ó Móráin as Minister for Justice. At age 31, O'Malley was the youngest Minister for Justice since Kevin O'Higgins who had been appointed age 30 in 1922.

It has also been alleged that O'Malley had later become aware of IRA Chief of Staff Seán Mac Stíofáin's status as a "misinformer", who whilst on the Gárda payroll fed misinformation to the Gárda Special Branch intelligence directorate known as C3.

Mac STIOPHAIN (sic) had until July 1972 conducted a brilliant masquerade as a Garda informant and been well paid to boot. His status would in all probability have continued but for documents found in the home of a retired Irish/American and a former Clann na Gael Treasurer, James CONATY, Drumshirk, Stradone. These documents were such that they were brought to the Minister for Justice for his personal perusal. That MacStíofáin should have been in receipt of State funds and regarded as an Informant must, to any sane objective person, appear the height of improbability but it is a fact. MacStíofáin was recruited in good faith in approximately 1961 but the justification of his later role must surely bewilder men of goodwill. You know how the PROVOS were formed, how SAOR EIRE acted as their Financial agents in the Republic so as not to incur the disapproval of the State against the Provos and until disenchantment about MacStíofáin occurred in July 1972 his immunity was at a reasonable level.

O'Malley knew that there was an informer because he mentions this fact in his memoirs – where he reveals that the Garda received a "tip-off" from an informer about the arms importation attempt that sparked the Arms Crisis of 1970. The informer was Seán Mac Stíofáin, who did so to discredit the Jack Lynch government and prevent the development of a potential rival military organisation - the Citizens' Defence Committees. Mac Stíofáin had sourced superior weapons independently from the United States and wished to eliminate the possibility of these weapons falling into the hands of his arch rival, Cathal Goulding, the leader of the Marxist rump faction, the Official IRA, whom the media alleged the weapons were destined for. Curiously, in Taoiseach Jack Lynch's account to Dáil Éireann mentioned no informer, stating instead that the arms were discovered quite by accident by Dublin Airport Staff.

As Minister for Justice, O'Malley reinforced the Offences Against the State Act so that a person could be convicted of IRA membership on the word of a Garda Superintendent. He also introduced the Special Criminal Court, a juryless court presided over by three judges which tries cases of terrorism and serious organised crime, with the cited raison d'être being to avoid witness intimidation. O'Malley's plans to introduce internment without trial for Provisional IRA suspects in the Republic were not implemented, but following an assassination threat by the IRA he was permitted to carry a handgun at all times and was frequently moved from house to house.

O'Malley also introduced the Forcible Entry Bill, brought in to counter student agitation over the demolition of valued buildings. This move was bitterly despised by students in University College Dublin, who pelted him with eggs during a meeting in retaliation.

Journalists sympathetic to the Official IRA and its political wing, Sinn Féin The Workers Party (from the 1982 as Workers' Party), in both The Irish Times and RTÉ, such as Dick Walsh, Seán Cronin, Gerry Gregg and Eoghan Harris claimed that, despite being acquitted of wrongdoing, Charles Haughey helped establish the Provisional IRA through the illegal importation of arms and lionized Taoiseach Jack Lynch and Des O'Malley as the defenders of constitutional democracy, with the latter forming the Progressive Democrats, when in fact Lynch quite lawfully ordered the importation of the arms, very likely with O'Malley's knowledge and that of others. But given the poor relations between the British and Irish governments at the time, to admit such would have been incendiary. Official IRA supporters in the media reviled the Provisional IRA and laid the blame for the 1970 split at the door of Charles Haughey, whom they accused of importing the arms to foment that very split, as Fianna Fáil feared a leftwing political competitor. Seán Mac Stíofáin's IRA rapidly eclipsed the 'Officials' (or, Stickies, as they became known) in men and manpower and the Official IRA declared a permanent ceasefire in 1972 (though continued to participate in feuding, murder and gangsterism for over a decade afterwards). Onwards into the 1980s and 1990s, other Irish Times luminaries, such as Fintan O'Toole, held to this myth as an explanation to the origin of the 1970 split, owing to a deep antipathy towards Charles Haughey personally and by contrast, Des O'Malley's stature as a paragon of virtue. But O'Malley's failure to act on intelligence concerning Seán Mac Stíofáin's activities would have exposed him as incompetent, in addition to untruthful concerning his knowledge of Jack Lynch's role in the importation of arms. Not until Seán Mac Stíofáin's role as a (mis)informer was revealed did the political narrative changed.

== In opposition ==
Following the 1973 general election Fianna Fáil lost office for the first time in 16 years by Fine Gael and Labour, who had agreed to a pre-election pact to form a coalition should they win. In 1974 O'Malley cast doubts over the Fine Gael and Labour brokered Sunningdale Agreement, declaring "Ireland is one Ireland, one nation, one country because God made it one". O'Malley also opposed the government's attempts to end the ban in Ireland of the sale of contraceptives. When a supreme court judge declared that "the deterrence of fornication and promiscuity" was "a legitimate legislative aim and a matter not of private but of public morality", O'Malley publicly agreed. O'Malley's view on this matter would evolve over time and later in his career, radically alter his relationship with Fianna Fáil.

== Fianna Fáil majority ==
At the 1977 general election, Fianna Fáil received a 23-seat majority in Dáil Éireann. O'Malley was appointed as Minister for Industry and Commerce at a time when Ireland's economic fortunes were going into rapid decline. In 1979, following Jack Lynch's resignation as Taoiseach and leader of Fianna Fáil, two candidates fought in the leadership election, George Colley and Charles Haughey. O'Malley and Martin O'Donoghue managed Colley's campaign, but Haughey won. Colley and O'Malley retained their positions in the government, but O'Donoghue's department was scrapped.

== Opposition to Haughey ==
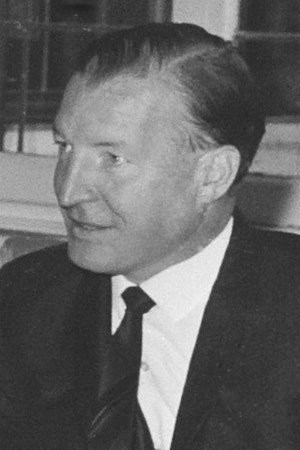
The rivalry between Charles Haughey and O'Malley culminated in O'Malley's expulsion from Fianna Fáil in 1985.

Following the February 1982 general election, Fianna Fáil, led by Haughey, failed to win an overall majority in the Dáil. Haughey was seen as the main reason for the election defeat. George Colley threw his support behind O'Malley as a leadership challenger, but no vote on the party leadership was taken. Haughey was elected Taoiseach again after negotiating confidence and supply arrangements with Sinn Féin The Workers' Party and two independents. O'Malley was appointed to the Cabinet as Minister for Trade, Commerce and Tourism.

A large number of TDs quickly grew disillusioned with Haughey's leadership and threw their support behind O'Malley in an effort to oust the incumbent leader. On 1 October 1982, a challenge to Haughey was initiated by a Kildare TD, Charlie McCreevy. O'Malley was on holiday in Spain at the time but rushed back to put his own name forward as a possible alternative to Haughey. He and his supporters resigned from the Cabinet. Haughey won an open vote by 58 votes to 22, with the result that those TDs who voted against Haughey, including O'Malley, became known as the Gang of 22.

In December 1982, a Fine Gael–Labour Party coalition government took office and its Minister for Justice, Michael Noonan, revealed that Haughey's government had been involved in the tapping of certain journalists' telephones. This set off another leadership struggle, with O'Malley, Gerry Collins, Michael O'Kennedy, Brian Lenihan and John Wilson all showing an interest in replacing Haughey. However, an official inquiry into the telephone tapping cleared Haughey of any wrongdoing and put more blame on Martin O'Donoghue than the other TDs involved. Haughey retained the leadership by 40 votes to 33.

Colley died in 1983 and O'Donoghue was no longer a TD. O'Malley became isolated within Fianna Fáil, with many of his supporters giving up hope of ever beating Haughey.

== Expulsion from Fianna Fáil ==
In May 1984, the New Ireland Forum report was published. Haughey had been a key figure in the Forum and had agreed to several possible solutions for solving the problem of Northern Ireland. However, he responded to the publication by declaring that the only possible solution was a united Ireland. O'Malley strongly criticised this position and accused Haughey of stifling debate. At a meeting of the Fianna Fáil Parliamentary Party to discuss the report the whip was removed from O'Malley.

In early 1985, the Fine Gael–Labour Party government introduced the Health (Family Planning) (Amendment) Bill 1985 to liberalise the sale of contraceptives. Fianna Fáil opposed the bill, but O'Malley considered it a matter of conscience and wanted to support it. O'Malley's speech was later praised as one of the best ever delivered in the Dáil, becoming known for the phrase "I stand by the Republic":

The politics of this would be very easy. The politics would be, to be one of the lads, the safest way in Ireland. But I do not believe that the interests of this State, or our Constitution and of this Republic, would be served by putting politics before conscience in regard to this. There is a choice of a kind that can only be answered by saying that I stand by the Republic and accordingly I will not oppose this Bill.

When the bill came to a vote, he abstained. However, that did not save him from Haughey's fury. On 26 February 1985, he was summoned to a party meeting and charged with "conduct unbecoming". Following a roll-call vote, he was expelled from Fianna Fáil by 73 votes to 9.

== Progressive Democrats ==
Immediately afterwards, Desmond O'Malley was contacted by a young Fine Gael activist, Michael McDowell, who encouraged O'Malley to found a new political party and offered any help he could give. On 21 December 1985, O'Malley announced the formation of the Progressive Democrats. He was joined by Mary Harney (like O'Malley, an independent TD expelled from Fianna Fáil), and later by Fianna Fáil TDs Bobby Molloy and Pearse Wyse and Fine Gael TD Michael Keating. At the 1987 general election, the Progressive Democrats won 14 seats, making the new party the third-biggest in the Dáil. Among the TDs elected for the new party were O'Malley and his cousin Patrick O'Malley; Anne Colley, daughter of George Colley; Martin Gibbons, son of Jim Gibbons; Michael McDowell and Martin Cullen. Fianna Fáil returned to power with Haughey as head of a minority government.

== Coalition with Fianna Fáil ==
In May 1989, Haughey called an early general election in the hope of winning an overall majority, but Fianna Fáil actually lost seats. The Progressive Democrats also lost seats, but held the balance of power. Haughey failed to be elected Taoiseach, as the Progressive Democrats voted for Fine Gael's leader Alan Dukes, but after Haughey formally resigned as Taoiseach he entered into negotiations with the Progressive Democrats to form a coalition. On 5 July 1989, Haughey and O'Malley agreed a deal for government, and O'Malley was appointed Minister for Industry and Commerce.

In 1990, Fianna Fáil's nominee in the presidential election was Brian Lenihan. A few weeks before the election a scandal broke over the accusation that Lenihan had phoned the President, Patrick Hillery in 1982, asking him not to dissolve the Dáil following the fall of Garret FitzGerald's government. Lenihan had always denied this, but now new evidence had come to light. O'Malley told Haughey that the Progressive Democrats would pull out of the coalition and support a no-confidence motion tabled by the opposition unless Lenihan left the government or Haughey opened an investigation into the incident. Haughey sacked Lenihan.

In early 1992, the programme for government was up for renewal. When it was revealed by Seán Doherty that Haughey had authorised the tapping of two journalists' telephones in 1982, O'Malley decided that the Progressive Democrats could no longer remain in his government. Haughey resigned on 11 February 1992 and was replaced as party leader and Taoiseach by Albert Reynolds. O'Malley and the Progressive Democrats continued in the coalition until Reynolds accused O'Malley of being "dishonest" while giving evidence to the Beef Tribunal. The collapse of the coalition that November led to the 1992 general election. Fianna Fáil returned to government in a coalition with the Labour Party and the Progressive Democrats moved into opposition.

== Retirement and later life ==
In October 1993, O'Malley retired as leader of the Progressive Democrats. He was succeeded by Mary Harney, one of the co-founders of the party. In 1994, O'Malley ran for the European Parliament but was defeated by Pat Cox, a sitting MEP who left the Progressive Democrats to run as an independent when O'Malley was selected as the candidate to replace him. O'Malley remained as a TD until his retirement from politics at the 2002 general election, when he was succeeded as TD by his cousin Tim O'Malley. His daughter Fiona O'Malley was elected to the Dáil as a Progressive Democrats TD. His son Eoin O'Malley is a political scientist in the School of Law and Government at Dublin City University.

In October 2014 he released a memoir, Conduct Unbecoming: A Memoir. The book received mixed reviews. The Irish Examiner described it as "pungent and to the point" while historian Diarmuid Ferriter, writing for the Irish Times, dismissed it as "an infuriatingly bad and poorly-written book", noting that "all sorts of assertions are made without evidence or elaboration and this approach is maintained throughout the book, underlining the lack of coherence or focus". Ferriter also took issue with a number of claims made by O'Malley particularly regarding the Arms Crisis.

O'Malley died on 21 July 2021 at the age of 82, having been in poor health for some time.

== Electoral results ==
Elections to the Dáil
Party	Election		FPv	FPv%	Result
Fianna Fáil	Limerick East	1968 by-election	16,638	43.7	Elected on count 3/3
Fianna Fáil	Limerick East	1969	5,960	16.6	Elected on count 7/7
Fianna Fáil	Limerick East	1973	7,806	21.0	Elected on count 1/6
Fianna Fáil	Limerick East	1977	8,762	19.5	Elected on count 6/10
Fianna Fáil	Limerick East	1981	9,346	19.2	Elected on count 1/9
Fianna Fáil	Limerick East	February 1982	9,049	19.1	Elected on count 1/10
Fianna Fáil	Limerick East	November 1982	10,615	22.5	Elected on count 1/9
Progressive Democrats	Limerick East	1987	12,358	24.9	Elected on count 1/13
Progressive Democrats	Limerick East	1989	8,385	18.1	Elected on count 1/8
Progressive Democrats	Limerick East	1992	8,304	17.2	Elected on count 1/12
Progressive Democrats	Limerick East	1997	4,358	8.8	Elected on count 9/11

== See also ==
- Families in the Oireachtas

Political offices
Preceded by Michael Carty	Government Chief Whip; 1969–1970	Succeeded by David Andrews
Preceded by Michael Carty	Parliamentary Secretary to the Minister for Defence; 1969–1970	Succeeded by David Andrews
Preceded by Mícheál Ó Móráin	Minister for Justice; 1970–1973	Succeeded by Patrick Cooney
Preceded by Justin Keating	Minister for Industry and Commerce; 1977–1981	Succeeded by John Kelly
Preceded by John Kelly	Minister for Trade, Commerce and Tourism; Feb–Oct 1982	Succeeded by Paddy Power
Preceded by Ray Burke	Minister for Industry and Commerce; 1989–1992	Succeeded by Pádraig Flynn
Party political offices
New political party	Leader of the Progressive Democrats; 1985–1993	Succeeded by Mary Harney

Dáil	Election	Deputy (Party)	Deputy (Party)	Deputy (Party)	Deputy (Party)	Deputy (Party)
13th	1948	Michael Keyes (Lab)	Robert Ryan (FF)	James Reidy (FG)	Daniel Bourke (FF)	4 seats 1948–1981
14th	1951	Michael Keyes (Lab)	Tadhg Crowley (FF)	James Reidy (FG)	Daniel Bourke (FF)	4 seats 1948–1981
14th	1952 by-election	Michael Keyes (Lab)	Tadhg Crowley (FF)	James Reidy (FG)	John Carew (FG)	4 seats 1948–1981
15th	1954	Michael Keyes (Lab)	Tadhg Crowley (FF)	Donogh O'Malley (FF)	John Carew (FG)	4 seats 1948–1981
16th	1957	Ted Russell (Ind.)	Paddy Clohessy (FF)	Donogh O'Malley (FF)	John Carew (FG)	4 seats 1948–1981
17th	1961	Stephen Coughlan (Lab)	Paddy Clohessy (FF)	Donogh O'Malley (FF)	Tom O'Donnell (FG)	4 seats 1948–1981
18th	1965	Stephen Coughlan (Lab)	Paddy Clohessy (FF)	Donogh O'Malley (FF)	Tom O'Donnell (FG)	4 seats 1948–1981
18th	1968 by-election	Stephen Coughlan (Lab)	Paddy Clohessy (FF)	Desmond O'Malley (FF)	Tom O'Donnell (FG)	4 seats 1948–1981
19th	1969	Stephen Coughlan (Lab)	Michael Herbert (FF)	Desmond O'Malley (FF)	Tom O'Donnell (FG)	4 seats 1948–1981
20th	1973	Stephen Coughlan (Lab)	Michael Herbert (FF)	Desmond O'Malley (FF)	Tom O'Donnell (FG)	4 seats 1948–1981
21st	1977	Michael Lipper (Ind.)	Michael Herbert (FF)	Desmond O'Malley (FF)	Tom O'Donnell (FG)	4 seats 1948–1981
22nd	1981	Jim Kemmy (Ind.)	Peadar Clohessy (FF)	Desmond O'Malley (FF)	Tom O'Donnell (FG)	Michael Noonan (FG)
23rd	1982 (Feb)	Jim Kemmy (DSP)	Willie O'Dea (FF)	Desmond O'Malley (FF)	Tom O'Donnell (FG)	Michael Noonan (FG)
24th	1982 (Nov)	Frank Prendergast (Lab)	Willie O'Dea (FF)	Desmond O'Malley (FF)	Tom O'Donnell (FG)	Michael Noonan (FG)
25th	1987	Jim Kemmy (DSP)	Willie O'Dea (FF)	Desmond O'Malley (PDs)	Peadar Clohessy (PDs)	Michael Noonan (FG)
26th	1989	Jim Kemmy (DSP)	Willie O'Dea (FF)	Desmond O'Malley (PDs)	Peadar Clohessy (PDs)	Michael Noonan (FG)
27th	1992	Jim Kemmy (Lab)	Willie O'Dea (FF)	Desmond O'Malley (PDs)	Peadar Clohessy (PDs)	Michael Noonan (FG)
28th	1997	Jim Kemmy (Lab)	Willie O'Dea (FF)	Desmond O'Malley (PDs)	Eddie Wade (FF)	Michael Noonan (FG)
28th	1998 by-election	Jan O'Sullivan (Lab)	Willie O'Dea (FF)	Desmond O'Malley (PDs)	Eddie Wade (FF)	Michael Noonan (FG)
29th	2002	Jan O'Sullivan (Lab)	Willie O'Dea (FF)	Tim O'Malley (PDs)	Peter Power (FF)	Michael Noonan (FG)
30th	2007	Jan O'Sullivan (Lab)	Willie O'Dea (FF)	Kieran O'Donnell (FG)	Peter Power (FF)	Michael Noonan (FG)
31st	2011	Constituency abolished. See Limerick City and Limerick				
