= Fiona O'Malley =

Irish politician (born 1968)

Senator
- In office 13 September 2007 – 25 May 2011
- Constituency: Nominated by the Taoiseach

Teachta Dála
- In office May 2002 – June 2007
- Constituency: Dún Laoghaire

Personal details
- Born: 19 January 1968 (age 58) Limerick, Ireland
- Party: Independent
- Other political affiliations: Progressive Democrats (until 2009)
- Relatives: Desmond O'Malley (father); Donogh O'Malley (granduncle); Tim O'Malley (cousin); Daragh O'Malley (cousin)
- Education: Trinity College Dublin; City University London

Fiona O'Malley (born 19 January 1968) is an Irish former politician who served as a Senator from 2007 to 2011, after being nominated by the Taoiseach. She served as a Teachta Dála (TD) for the Dún Laoghaire constituency from 2002 to 2007.

== Political career ==
O'Malley comes from a political family. Her father, Desmond O'Malley, was a former Fianna Fáil cabinet minister and founder of the Progressive Democrats. Her granduncle, Donogh O'Malley, was a Fianna Fáil minister in the 1960s. She is also a cousin of another former Progressive Democrats TD, Tim O'Malley.

A graduate of Trinity College Dublin and City University London, she worked as an Arts Administrator before entering politics and as a Personal assistant to Liz O'Donnell from 1998 to 2000. Her first political position was as elected member of the Dún Laoghaire–Rathdown County Council from 1999. She was elected to Dáil Éireann for the Dún Laoghaire constituency at the 2002 general election. She resigned her council seat in 2003 when the dual mandate came into effect.

She was a member of the Oireachtas Committee on Arts, Sports and Tourism and the Oireachtas Committee on Health and Children. She was also a member of the Dáil All-Party group concerned with matters of sexual and reproductive health. She has travelled to South America and South Africa with the United Nations Population Fund and has spoken extensively of the need for a clear safe sex message both in Ireland and in the developing world.

She lost her Dáil seat at the 2007 general election, but was nominated by the Taoiseach, Bertie Ahern to the Seanad in August 2007. She was narrowly defeated in the race to become the leader of the Progressive Democrats by Ciarán Cannon.

She was an independent politician from the dissolution of the Progressive Democrats in 2009. She was an independent candidate at the 2011 Seanad election for the Dublin University constituency but was not elected.

== See also ==
- Families in the Oireachtas

Dáil	Election	Deputy (Party)	Deputy (Party)	Deputy (Party)	Deputy (Party)	Deputy (Party)
21st	1977	David Andrews (FF)	Liam Cosgrave (FG)	Barry Desmond (Lab)	Martin O'Donoghue (FF)	4 seats 1977–1981
22nd	1981	David Andrews (FF)	Liam T. Cosgrave (FG)	Barry Desmond (Lab)	Martin O'Donoghue (FF)	Seán Barrett (FG)
23rd	1982 (Feb)	David Andrews (FF)	Liam T. Cosgrave (FG)	Barry Desmond (Lab)	Martin O'Donoghue (FF)	Seán Barrett (FG)
24th	1982 (Nov)	David Andrews (FF)	Liam T. Cosgrave (FG)	Barry Desmond (Lab)	Monica Barnes (FG)	Seán Barrett (FG)
25th	1987	David Andrews (FF)	Geraldine Kennedy (PDs)	Barry Desmond (Lab)	Monica Barnes (FG)	Seán Barrett (FG)
26th	1989	David Andrews (FF)	Brian Hillery (FF)	Eamon Gilmore (WP)	Monica Barnes (FG)	Seán Barrett (FG)
27th	1992	David Andrews (FF)	Helen Keogh (PDs)	Eamon Gilmore (DL)	Niamh Bhreathnach (Lab)	Seán Barrett (FG)
28th	1997	David Andrews (FF)	Monica Barnes (FG)	Eamon Gilmore (Lab)	Mary Hanafin (FF)	Seán Barrett (FG)
29th	2002	Barry Andrews (FF)	Fiona O'Malley (PDs)	Eamon Gilmore (Lab)	Mary Hanafin (FF)	Ciarán Cuffe (GP)
30th	2007	Barry Andrews (FF)	Seán Barrett (Note: Served as Ceann Comhairle in the 31st Dáil from 2011 to 2016 and was returned automatically at the 2016 general election.) (FG)	Eamon Gilmore (Lab)	Mary Hanafin (FF)	Ciarán Cuffe (GP)
31st	2011	Mary Mitchell O'Connor (FG)	Seán Barrett (FG)	Eamon Gilmore (Lab)	Richard Boyd Barrett (PBP)	4 seats from 2011
32nd	2016	Mary Mitchell O'Connor (FG)	Seán Barrett (FG)	Maria Bailey (FG)	Richard Boyd Barrett (AAA–PBP)	4 seats from 2011
33rd	2020	Jennifer Carroll MacNeill (FG)	Ossian Smyth (GP)	Cormac Devlin (FF)	Richard Boyd Barrett (S–PBP)	4 seats from 2011
34th	2024	Jennifer Carroll MacNeill (FG)	Barry Ward (FG)	Cormac Devlin (FF)	Richard Boyd Barrett (PBP–S)	4 seats from 2011
