= Seán Gibbons =

Irish politician (1883–1952)

Cathaoirleach of Seanad Éireann
- In office 27 April 1938 – 8 September 1943
- Preceded by: Thomas Westropp Bennett
- Succeeded by: Seán Goulding

Senator
- In office 21 April 1948 – 14 August 1951
- In office 27 April 1938 – 18 August 1944
- Constituency: Agricultural Panel

Teachta Dála
- In office February 1932 – July 1937
- In office August 1923 – 30 October 1924
- Constituency: Carlow–Kilkenny

Personal details
- Born: 31 May 1883 County Kilkenny, Ireland
- Died: 19 April 1952 (aged 68) County Kilkenny, Ireland
- Party: Fianna Fáil
- Other political affiliations: Cumann na nGaedheal; National Group
- Relatives: Jim Gibbons Snr (nephew); Martin Gibbons (grand-nephew); Jim Gibbons Jnr (grand-nephew)

Séan Francis Gibbons (31 May 1883 – 19 April 1952) was an Irish politician who sat as Cumann na nGaedheal Teachta Dála (TD) in the 1920s and as a Fianna Fáil TD in the 1930s. He later became a Senator, and was Cathaoirleach (chairperson) of the Seanad for five years.

== Revolutionary period ==
Gibbons did not take part in the 1916 Easter Rising but was arrested in its aftermath and was interned in several prisons in Ireland, Wales and England. During the Irish War of Independence, he served as Company Captain of Clomantagh Company of 2 Battalion, Kilkenny Brigade, Irish Republican Army (IRA) and later as Battalion Intelligence Officer. Taking the pro-Treaty side in the Irish Civil War, he was attached to Kilkenny Brigade, 2 Southern Division, National Army. He resigned from the National Army in August 1923 to take part in the general election as a Cumann na nGaedheal candidate.

Gibbons was later awarded a pension by the Irish government under the Military Service Pensions Act, 1934 for his service with the IRA and the National Army between 1920 and 1923. Unusually, Gibbons never accepted receipt of nor was paid any part of this pension prior to his death in 1952. In his will he left his military service pension and arrears arising up to his death, to the Minister for Finance, to be used in the reduction of the debt of the Irish state.

== Politics ==
Gibbons was elected to Dáil Éireann on his first attempt, as a Cumann na nGaedheal candidate in the Carlow–Kilkenny constituency at the 1923 general election. However, he was not an active participant in proceedings because his health was poor, requiring him to leave the country at one point.

He left Cumann na nGaedhael to join the National Group in March 1924, led by Joseph McGrath, in the aftermath of the Army Mutiny. He and eight other National Party TDs resigned their seats in the 4th Dáil on 30 October 1924, only 14 months after his election. The by-election was held on 11 March 1925 and won by Cumann na nGaedheal's Thomas Bolger.

Gibbons joined Fianna Fáil and stood for them as a candidate in Carlow–Kilkenny at the 1932 general election, winning one of his party's fifteen new seats in the 7th Dáil. He was returned at the 1933 general election, but after the constituency was divided under the Electoral (Revision of Constituencies) Act 1935, he lost his seat at the 1937 general election in the new Kilkenny constituency.

He then stood as a Fianna Fáil candidate for election to Seanad Éireann on the Agricultural Panel, winning a seat in the 2nd Seanad and becoming Cathaoirleach. He remained as Cathoirleach in the 3rd Seanad, holding the office until 1944, when he was re-elected to the 4th Seanad. He did not sit in the 5th Seanad but was re-elected by the Agricultural Panel to the 6th Seanad, sitting from 1948 to 1951.

He died on 19 April 1952, aged 68. Five years later, his nephew Jim Gibbons was elected as a Fianna Fáil TD in the restored Carlow–Kilkenny constituency, where Jim's son Martin Gibbons was a Progressive Democrats TD from 1987 to 1989. Another of Jim's sons, Jim Gibbons Jnr was a Progressive Democrats senator.

== See also ==
- Families in the Oireachtas

Oireachtas
Preceded by Thomas Westropp Bennett	Cathaoirleach of Seanad Éireann; 1938–1943	Succeeded by Seán Goulding

Dáil	Election	Deputy (Party)	Deputy (Party)	Deputy (Party)	Deputy (Party)	Deputy (Party)
2nd	1921	Edward Aylward (SF)	W. T. Cosgrave (SF)	James Lennon (SF)	Gearóid O'Sullivan (SF)	4 seats 1921–1923
3rd	1922	Patrick Gaffney (Lab)	W. T. Cosgrave (PT-SF)	Denis Gorey (FP)	Gearóid O'Sullivan (PT-SF)	4 seats 1921–1923
4th	1923	Edward Doyle (Lab)	W. T. Cosgrave (CnaG)	Denis Gorey (FP)	Michael Shelly (Rep)	Seán Gibbons (CnaG)
4th	1925 by-election	Edward Doyle (Lab)	W. T. Cosgrave (CnaG)	Denis Gorey (FP)	Michael Shelly (Rep)	Thomas Bolger (CnaG)
5th	1927 (Jun)	Edward Doyle (Lab)	W. T. Cosgrave (CnaG)	Denis Gorey (CnaG)	Thomas Derrig (FF)	Richard Holohan (FP)
6th	1927 (Sep)	Edward Doyle (Lab)	W. T. Cosgrave (CnaG)	Peter de Loughry (CnaG)	Thomas Derrig (FF)	Richard Holohan (FP)
6th	1927 by-election	Edward Doyle (Lab)	Denis Gorey (CnaG)	Peter de Loughry (CnaG)	Thomas Derrig (FF)	Richard Holohan (FP)
7th	1932	Francis Humphreys (FF)	Denis Gorey (CnaG)	Desmond FitzGerald (CnaG)	Thomas Derrig (FF)	Seán Gibbons (FF)
8th	1933	James Pattison (Lab)	Richard Holohan (NCP)	Desmond FitzGerald (CnaG)	Thomas Derrig (FF)	Seán Gibbons (FF)
9th	1937	Constituency abolished. See Kilkenny and Carlow–Kildare				

Dáil	Election	Deputy (Party)	Deputy (Party)	Deputy (Party)	Deputy (Party)	Deputy (Party)
13th	1948	James Pattison (NLP)	Thomas Walsh (FF)	Thomas Derrig (FF)	Joseph Hughes (FG)	Patrick Crotty (FG)
14th	1951	Francis Humphreys (FF)	Thomas Walsh (FF)	Thomas Derrig (FF)	Joseph Hughes (FG)	Patrick Crotty (FG)
15th	1954	James Pattison (Lab)	Thomas Walsh (FF)	Thomas Derrig (FF)	Joseph Hughes (FG)	Patrick Crotty (FG)
15th	1956 by-election	James Pattison (Lab)	Martin Medlar (FF)	Thomas Derrig (FF)	Joseph Hughes (FG)	Patrick Crotty (FG)
16th	1957	Francis Humphreys (FF)	Martin Medlar (FF)	Jim Gibbons (FF)	Joseph Hughes (FG)	Patrick Crotty (FG)
16th	1960 by-election	Patrick Teehan (FF)	Martin Medlar (FF)	Jim Gibbons (FF)	Joseph Hughes (FG)	Patrick Crotty (FG)
17th	1961	Séamus Pattison (Lab)	Martin Medlar (FF)	Jim Gibbons (FF)	Desmond Governey (FG)	Patrick Crotty (FG)
18th	1965	Séamus Pattison (Lab)	Tom Nolan (FF)	Jim Gibbons (FF)	Desmond Governey (FG)	Patrick Crotty (FG)
19th	1969	Séamus Pattison (Lab)	Tom Nolan (FF)	Jim Gibbons (FF)	Desmond Governey (FG)	Kieran Crotty (FG)
20th	1973	Séamus Pattison (Lab)	Tom Nolan (FF)	Jim Gibbons (FF)	Desmond Governey (FG)	Kieran Crotty (FG)
21st	1977	Séamus Pattison (Lab)	Tom Nolan (FF)	Jim Gibbons (FF)	Liam Aylward (FF)	Kieran Crotty (FG)
22nd	1981	Séamus Pattison (Lab)	Tom Nolan (FF)	Desmond Governey (FG)	Liam Aylward (FF)	Kieran Crotty (FG)
23rd	1982 (Feb)	Séamus Pattison (Lab)	Jim Gibbons (FF)	Desmond Governey (FG)	Liam Aylward (FF)	Kieran Crotty (FG)
24th	1982 (Nov)	Séamus Pattison (Lab)	M. J. Nolan (FF)	Dick Dowling (FG)	Liam Aylward (FF)	Kieran Crotty (FG)
25th	1987	Séamus Pattison (Lab)	M. J. Nolan (FF)	Martin Gibbons (PDs)	Liam Aylward (FF)	Kieran Crotty (FG)
26th	1989	Séamus Pattison (Lab)	M. J. Nolan (FF)	Phil Hogan (FG)	Liam Aylward (FF)	John Browne (FG)
27th	1992	Séamus Pattison (Lab)	M. J. Nolan (FF)	Phil Hogan (FG)	Liam Aylward (FF)	John Browne (FG)
28th	1997	Séamus Pattison (Lab)	John McGuinness (FF)	Phil Hogan (FG)	Liam Aylward (FF)	John Browne (FG)
29th	2002	Séamus Pattison (Lab)	John McGuinness (FF)	Phil Hogan (FG)	Liam Aylward (FF)	M. J. Nolan (FF)
30th	2007	Mary White (GP)	John McGuinness (FF)	Phil Hogan (FG)	Bobby Aylward (FF)	M. J. Nolan (FF)
31st	2011	Ann Phelan (Lab)	John McGuinness (FF)	Phil Hogan (FG)	John Paul Phelan (FG)	Pat Deering (FG)
31st	2015 by-election	Ann Phelan (Lab)	John McGuinness (FF)	Bobby Aylward (FF)	John Paul Phelan (FG)	Pat Deering (FG)
32nd	2016	Kathleen Funchion (SF)	John McGuinness (FF)	Bobby Aylward (FF)	John Paul Phelan (FG)	Pat Deering (FG)
33rd	2020	Kathleen Funchion (SF)	John McGuinness (FF)	Jennifer Murnane O'Connor (FF)	John Paul Phelan (FG)	Malcolm Noonan (GP)
34th	2024	Natasha Newsome Drennan (SF)	John McGuinness (FF)	Jennifer Murnane O'Connor (FF)	Catherine Callaghan (FG)	Peter "Chap" Cleere (FF)
