= Jim Gibbons Jnr =

Irish former politician (born 1954)

Senator
- In office 17 September 1997 – 12 September 2002
- Constituency: Nominated by the Taoiseach

Personal details
- Born: 26 April 1954 (age 71) Kilkenny, Ireland
- Party: Progressive Democrats
- Parent: Jim Gibbons Snr (father)
- Relatives: Martin Gibbons (brother); Seán Gibbons (granduncle)

James Gibbons (born 26 April 1954) is an Irish former Progressive Democrats politician who served as a member of Seanad Éireann.

The son of former Fianna Fáil TD and cabinet minister Jim Gibbons Snr, Gibbons stood at the 1997 general election as the Progressive Democrats candidate in Carlow–Kilkenny constituency, previously represented both by his father Jim (between 1957 and 1981, then between February and November 1982) and by his brother Martin Gibbons (between 1987 and 1989). Gibbons came in eighth place in the five-seater constituency.

After his defeat at the 1997 general election Jim Gibbons was nominated to the 21st Seanad by the Taoiseach, Bertie Ahern. Gibbons was also unsuccessful at the 1999 local elections, failing to be elected either to Carlow County Council or to Carlow Town Council.

== See also ==
- Families in the Oireachtas
