= Colley Report =

Irish Government paper on same-sex marriage

The Colley Report is a 2006 paper on same-sex marriage and civil partnership produced for the Irish Government. Formally known as the Options Paper on Cohabiting Couples (2006), the report was named after its chair, Anne Colley.

== Background ==
On 20 December 2005, the Minister for Justice, Michael McDowell, announced that he was creating a working group in the Department of Justice to provide options for government consideration. This announcement came the day after Belfast in Northern Ireland held the first of the new UK Civil Partnership registration ceremonies. The Government said that it would legislate following the report, but Taoiseach Bertie Ahern also said there might not be time to do so before the then upcoming election.

== Process ==
Chaired by former TD Anne Colley, this working group included the Gay and Lesbian Equality Network (GLEN), the gay rights lobby organisation, who said they expected a recommendation for civil marriage. The group facilitated a conference on the topic in May 2006, as input to its reports which was attended by experts from other countries which have introduced civil unions and gay marriage. During his speech, McDowell was interrupted by members of the Ancient Order of Hibernians opposed to the Government plans.

== Outcome ==
Initially to report by March 2006, the group presented its report to Government in November 2006. They recommended that a civil partnership scheme would resolve most of the issues for same-sex and cohabiting couples, while providing fewer benefits than marriage. Offering civil marriage to gay couples would be open to constitutional challenge. They also recommended a legal presumption of partnership for couples which have lived together for three years or have children together. No recommendations were made for couples in non-conjugal relationships due to lack of research. The cabinet reviewed the report, but no legislation was introduced before the 2007 General election, and in the intervening period the Government rejected opposition legislation, saying that legislation should await the KAL Case Supreme Court challenge.

== Response ==
The Report was welcomed by GLEN, the Irish Human Rights Commission, and other rights organisations. Ógra Fianna Fáil also called for full implementation of the Report. At the same time, a number of LGBT groups, including GLEN, LGBTNoise, and MarriagEquality, criticised Civil Partnership as "a separate and unequal institution".

== See also ==
- Campaign for Homosexual Law Reform (Ireland)
- LGBT rights in Europe
- LGBT rights in the Republic of Ireland
- LGBT rights in the United Kingdom
- List of Laws and Reports on Gay and Lesbian Rights in Ireland
- Recognition of same-sex unions in Ireland
- teaghlach (Non-gender specific definition of Family in the Constitution, Bunreacht na hÉireann, An Teaghlach, Airteagal 41.3.1°)
