= Tim O'Malley (politician) =

Irish former politician (born 1944)

Minister of State
- 2002–2007: Health and Children

Teachta Dála
- In office May 2002 – May 2007
- Constituency: Limerick East

Personal details
- Born: 3 July 1944 (age 82) Limerick, Ireland
- Party: Independent
- Other political affiliations: Progressive Democrats (until 2009)
- Relatives: Donogh O'Malley (uncle); Desmond O'Malley (cousin); Fiona O'Malley (cousin); Daragh O'Malley (cousin)
- Education: University College Dublin

Tim O'Malley (born 3 July 1944) is an Irish former politician who served as Minister of State for Mental Health Services and Food Safety from 2002 to 2007. He served as a Teachta Dála (TD) for the Limerick East constituency from 2002 to 2007.

O'Malley was born in Barrington Street in Limerick. He was educated at Crescent College, Limerick and University College Dublin where he received a Bachelor of Science in Pharmacy. Before entering electoral politics, O'Malley managed his own pharmacy in the Limerick city suburb of Dooradoyle. He served as president of the Irish Pharmaceutical Union, the representative body for over 1,400 community pharmacies in Ireland. He was also awarded a fellowship by the Pharmaceutical Society of Ireland for services rendered to the profession. He later withdrew from management and ownership of the pharmacy business to concentrate full-time on politics.

He first held political office in 1991 when he was elected to Limerick County Council. O'Malley was elected to Dáil Éireann at the 2002 general election.

In 2001, he was appointed Health spokesperson for the Progressive Democrats, and successfully spearheaded his party's campaign to have a Treatment Purchase Fund included in the Government Health Strategy, as a means of reducing public patient waiting lists in Irish hospitals.

When O'Malley was in government, he set up an expert group to formulate National policy for Mental Health in Ireland. In 2003, he called for the Health Board system to be abolished. In 2006, he launched the new policy Vision For Change and it became government policy. He was very involved in bringing radiotherapy services to Limerick, in spite of national reports which said that there should only be three radiotherapy centres in Ireland, in Dublin, Cork and Galway. O'Malley also convinced his ministerial colleagues that a new graduate-entry medical school should be set up in the University of Limerick.

In December of that year, he came under increasing pressure from opposition TDs to resign following a Prime Time Investigates television programme broadcast on RTÉ One which criticised the lack of mental health services available for Irish children. He implied in the programme that long waiting lists for psychiatric services were in some cases engineered by psychiatrists themselves in search of a feeling of power.

He lost his seat at the 2007 general election.

== See also ==
- Families in the Oireachtas

Political offices
| Preceded by Tom Moffatt | Minister of State for Disability and Mental Health; 2002–2007 | Succeeded by Jimmy Devins |

| Dáil | Election | Deputy (Party) | Deputy (Party) | Deputy (Party) | Deputy (Party) | Deputy (Party) |
|---|---|---|---|---|---|---|
| 13th | 1948 | Michael Keyes (Lab) | Robert Ryan (FF) | James Reidy (FG) | Daniel Bourke (FF) | 4 seats 1948–1981 |
| 14th | 1951 | Michael Keyes (Lab) | Tadhg Crowley (FF) | James Reidy (FG) | Daniel Bourke (FF) | 4 seats 1948–1981 |
| 14th | 1952 by-election | Michael Keyes (Lab) | Tadhg Crowley (FF) | James Reidy (FG) | John Carew (FG) | 4 seats 1948–1981 |
| 15th | 1954 | Michael Keyes (Lab) | Tadhg Crowley (FF) | Donogh O'Malley (FF) | John Carew (FG) | 4 seats 1948–1981 |
| 16th | 1957 | Ted Russell (Ind.) | Paddy Clohessy (FF) | Donogh O'Malley (FF) | John Carew (FG) | 4 seats 1948–1981 |
| 17th | 1961 | Stephen Coughlan (Lab) | Paddy Clohessy (FF) | Donogh O'Malley (FF) | Tom O'Donnell (FG) | 4 seats 1948–1981 |
| 18th | 1965 | Stephen Coughlan (Lab) | Paddy Clohessy (FF) | Donogh O'Malley (FF) | Tom O'Donnell (FG) | 4 seats 1948–1981 |
| 18th | 1968 by-election | Stephen Coughlan (Lab) | Paddy Clohessy (FF) | Desmond O'Malley (FF) | Tom O'Donnell (FG) | 4 seats 1948–1981 |
| 19th | 1969 | Stephen Coughlan (Lab) | Michael Herbert (FF) | Desmond O'Malley (FF) | Tom O'Donnell (FG) | 4 seats 1948–1981 |
| 20th | 1973 | Stephen Coughlan (Lab) | Michael Herbert (FF) | Desmond O'Malley (FF) | Tom O'Donnell (FG) | 4 seats 1948–1981 |
| 21st | 1977 | Michael Lipper (Ind.) | Michael Herbert (FF) | Desmond O'Malley (FF) | Tom O'Donnell (FG) | 4 seats 1948–1981 |
| 22nd | 1981 | Jim Kemmy (Ind.) | Peadar Clohessy (FF) | Desmond O'Malley (FF) | Tom O'Donnell (FG) | Michael Noonan (FG) |
| 23rd | 1982 (Feb) | Jim Kemmy (DSP) | Willie O'Dea (FF) | Desmond O'Malley (FF) | Tom O'Donnell (FG) | Michael Noonan (FG) |
| 24th | 1982 (Nov) | Frank Prendergast (Lab) | Willie O'Dea (FF) | Desmond O'Malley (FF) | Tom O'Donnell (FG) | Michael Noonan (FG) |
| 25th | 1987 | Jim Kemmy (DSP) | Willie O'Dea (FF) | Desmond O'Malley (PDs) | Peadar Clohessy (PDs) | Michael Noonan (FG) |
| 26th | 1989 | Jim Kemmy (DSP) | Willie O'Dea (FF) | Desmond O'Malley (PDs) | Peadar Clohessy (PDs) | Michael Noonan (FG) |
| 27th | 1992 | Jim Kemmy (Lab) | Willie O'Dea (FF) | Desmond O'Malley (PDs) | Peadar Clohessy (PDs) | Michael Noonan (FG) |
| 28th | 1997 | Jim Kemmy (Lab) | Willie O'Dea (FF) | Desmond O'Malley (PDs) | Eddie Wade (FF) | Michael Noonan (FG) |
| 28th | 1998 by-election | Jan O'Sullivan (Lab) | Willie O'Dea (FF) | Desmond O'Malley (PDs) | Eddie Wade (FF) | Michael Noonan (FG) |
| 29th | 2002 | Jan O'Sullivan (Lab) | Willie O'Dea (FF) | Tim O'Malley (PDs) | Peter Power (FF) | Michael Noonan (FG) |
| 30th | 2007 | Jan O'Sullivan (Lab) | Willie O'Dea (FF) | Kieran O'Donnell (FG) | Peter Power (FF) | Michael Noonan (FG) |
| 31st | 2011 | Constituency abolished. See Limerick City and Limerick | | | | |
