= George Colley =

Irish politician (1925–1983)

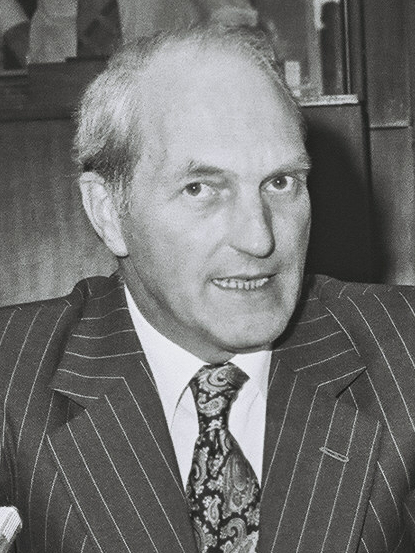
- Colley in 1979

Tánaiste
- In office 5 July 1977 – 30 June 1981
- Taoiseach: Jack Lynch; Charles Haughey
- Preceded by: Brendan Corish
- Succeeded by: Michael O'Leary

Minister for Energy
- In office 22 January 1980 – 30 June 1981
- Taoiseach: Charles Haughey
- Preceded by: Michael O'Kennedy
- Succeeded by: Michael O'Leary

Minister for Tourism and Transport
- In office 12 December 1979 – 22 January 1980
- Taoiseach: Charles Haughey
- Preceded by: Pádraig Faulkner
- Succeeded by: Albert Reynolds

Minister for the Public Service
- In office 5 July 1977 – 11 December 1979
- Taoiseach: Jack Lynch
- Preceded by: Pádraig Faulkner
- Succeeded by: Albert Reynolds

Minister for Finance
- In office 5 July 1977 – 11 December 1979
- Taoiseach: Jack Lynch
- Preceded by: Richie Ryan
- Succeeded by: Michael O'Kennedy
- In office 9 May 1970 – 14 March 1973
- Taoiseach: Jack Lynch
- Preceded by: Charles Haughey
- Succeeded by: Richie Ryan

Minister for the Gaeltacht
- In office 2 July 1969 – 14 March 1973
- Taoiseach: Jack Lynch
- Preceded by: Pádraig Faulkner
- Succeeded by: Tom O'Donnell

Minister for Industry and Commerce
- In office 13 July 1966 – 9 May 1970
- Taoiseach: Jack Lynch
- Preceded by: Patrick Hillery
- Succeeded by: Patrick Lalor

Minister for Education
- In office 21 April 1965 – 13 July 1966
- Taoiseach: Seán Lemass
- Preceded by: Patrick Hillery
- Succeeded by: Donogh O'Malley

Parliamentary Secretary
- 1964–1965: Lands

Teachta Dála
- In office June 1981 – 17 September 1983
- Constituency: Dublin Central
- In office June 1977 – June 1981
- Constituency: Dublin Clontarf
- In office June 1969 – June 1977
- Constituency: Dublin North-Central
- In office October 1961 – June 1969
- Constituency: Dublin North-East

Personal details
- Born: 18 October 1925 Fairview, Dublin, Ireland
- Died: 17 September 1983 (aged 57) London, England
- Party: Fianna Fáil
- Spouse: Mary Doolan (m. 1950)
- Children: 7, including Anne
- Parent: Harry Colley (father)
- Education: University College Dublin

George Colley (18 October 1925 – 17 September 1983) was an Irish Fianna Fáil politician who served as Tánaiste from 1977 to 1981, Minister for Energy from 1980 to 1981, Minister for Tourism and Transport from 1979 to 1980, Minister for the Public Service from 1977 to 1979, Minister for Finance from 1970 to 1973 and from 1977 to 1979, Minister for the Gaeltacht from 1969 to 1973, Minister for Industry and Commerce from 1966 to 1970, Minister for Education from 1965 to 1966 and Parliamentary Secretary to the Minister for Lands from 1964 to 1965. He served as a Teachta Dála (TD) from 1961 to 1983.

== Early life ==
Colley was born in the Dublin suburb of Fairview, in 1925. He was the son of Harry Colley and Christina Colley (née Nugent). His father was a veteran of the 1916 Easter Rising and a former adjutant in the Irish Republican Army (IRA), who was elected to Dáil Éireann in 1944, as a Fianna Fáil candidate.

He was educated at St Joseph's Secondary C.B.S. in Fairview, where one of his classmates and closest friends was Charles Haughey, who later became his political arch-rival. He studied law at University College Dublin and qualified as a solicitor in the mid-1940s. He remained friends with Haughey after leaving school and, ironically, encouraged him to become a member of Fianna Fáil in 1951. Haughey was elected to Dáil Éireann in the 1957 general election, ousting Colley's father in the process. This put some strain on the relationship between the two young men.

== Political career ==
Colley was elected to the Dáil at the 1961 general election, reclaiming his father's old seat in the Dublin North-East constituency. Furthermore, he was elected in the same constituency as Haughey, thereby accentuating the rivalry. Thereafter, Colley progressed rapidly through the ranks of Fianna Fáil. He became a member of the Dáil at a time when a change from the older to the younger generation was taking place, a change facilitated by the Taoiseach Seán Lemass.

He was active in the Oireachtas as chairman of some of the Joint Labour Committees, which were set up under the Labour Court, to fix legally enforceable wages for groups of workers who had not been effectively organised in trade unions. He was also leader of the Irish parliamentary delegation to the Consultative Assembly of the Council of Europe. Colley's work as a backbencher was rewarded by his appointment as Parliamentary Secretary to the Minister for Lands in October 1964.

=== Minister for Education (1965–1966) ===
Following the return of Lemass's government at the 1965 general election, Colley joined the cabinet as Minister for Education. He introduced a plan to establish comprehensive schools, set up an advisory council on post-primary school accommodation in Dublin, and introduced a school psychological service.

=== Minister for Industry and Commerce (1966–1970) ===
He was promoted as Minister for Industry and Commerce, in a cabinet reshuffle in July 1966, and he continued the government policy of economic expansion that had prevailed since the late 1950s.

In November 1966, Seán Lemass resigned suddenly as party leader. Colley contested the subsequent leadership election. He was the favoured candidate of party elders such as Seán MacEntee and Frank Aiken, the latter managing Colley's campaign and annoyed at Lemass's quick decision to retire before Colley had built up his support. Colley was considered to be in the same mould as the party founders, concerned with issues such as the peaceful reunification of the country and the cause of the Irish language. Charles Haughey and Neil Blaney, also declared their interest in the leadership; however, both withdrew when the Minister for Finance, Jack Lynch, announced his candidacy. Colley did not back down and the leadership issue went to a vote for the first time in the history of the Fianna Fáil party.

The leadership election took place on 9 November 1966, and Lynch beat Colley by 59 votes to 19. When the new Taoiseach announced his cabinet, Colley retained the Industry and Commerce portfolio.

Following Fianna Fáil's success at the 1969 general election, Colley held onto his existing cabinet post and also took charge of the Gaeltacht portfolio, an area where he had a personal interest. He used this dual position to direct industrial investment to Gaeltacht areas. He set about changing the traditional view of the Irish-speaking regions as backward and promoted their equal claim to the more sophisticated industries being established in Ireland by foreign investment.

=== Minister for Finance (1970–1973) ===
In the wake of the Arms Crisis in 1970, a major reshuffle of the cabinet took place. Four Ministers, Charles Haughey, Neil Blaney, Kevin Boland and Mícheál Ó Móráin, were either removed, resigned, or simply retired from the government due to the scandal that was about to unfold. Despite his defeat by Jack Lynch in the leadership contest four years earlier, Colley had remained loyal to the party leader and had become a close political ally. He was rewarded by his appointment as Minister for Finance, the second most important position in government, while retaining the Gaeltacht portfolio.

Colley was regarded as a predictable Minister and the ultimate safe man, as a highly orthodox Keynesian. His decision to introduce budget deficits in his first three budgets was even welcomed by the opposition. He oversaw the decimalisation of the Irish currency in 1971. He also championed the introduction of RTÉ Raidió na Gaeltachta and argued the financial case for it in 1972, as the Minister with responsibility for the Gaeltacht.

=== In opposition (1973–1977) ===
In 1973, Fianna Fáil was ousted after sixteen years in government when the national coalition of Fine Gael and the Labour Party came to power. Colley was appointed opposition Spokesman on Finance, in the new Fianna Fáil front bench. He came to be regarded as a hard-working spokesman and was a constant critic of what he viewed as the coalition government's restrictive economic policy and of the capital taxation which he believed discouraged investment.

As the 1977 general election approached, Colley and Martin O'Donoghue were the main architects of Fianna Fáil's election manifesto. The party's programme for government included several inducements, including the abolition of car tax and rates on houses, as it was believed that the coalition government would retain office.

=== Tánaiste and Minister (1977–1981) ===
Fianna Fáil swept to power at the 1977 general election, with a 20-seat Dáil majority, contrary to opinion polls and political commentators. Colley was re-appointed as Minister for Finance and Minister for the Public Service, and was also appointed as Tánaiste (Deputy Prime Minister). The latter appointment established him as the heir apparent to Taoiseach Jack Lynch.

During his second term as Finance Minister, Colley implemented controversial policies from the election manifesto. He immediately set about dismantling the previous government's capital taxation programme while also abolishing the wealth tax and diluting the capital gains and capital acquisition taxes. His policy of low taxation and continued government investment resulted in massive foreign borrowing and a balance of payments deficit. In 1979, Fianna Fáil's economic policies were derailed due to strikes, higher wage demands, and the 1979 energy crisis. The introduction of a two per cent levy on agricultural production angered some rural backbench TDs, and party tensions emerged.

In December 1979, Jack Lynch resigned unexpectedly as Taoiseach and as Fianna Fáil leader. It is said that Colley and his supporters encouraged Lynch to retire one month earlier than planned because he felt he had the support to win a leadership contest and that the quick decision would catch Charles Haughey and his supporters off guard.

Support for both candidates was evenly matched throughout the leadership contest. Colley had the backing of the majority of the Cabinet and the party hierarchy, while Haughey relied on support from the first-time backbenchers. A secret ballot was taken on Friday, 7 December 1979. The Minister for Foreign Affairs, Michael O'Kennedy announced his support for Haughey on the eve of the election. This was believed to have swung the vote, and Haughey beat Colley by 44 votes to 38.

Colley remained as Tánaiste but demanded and received a veto on Haughey's ministerial appointments to the departments of Justice and Defence. Colley was removed from his position as Minister for Finance and Minister for the Public Service. He declined the position of Minister for Foreign Affairs, preferring instead a domestic portfolio, which resulted in a demotion. He was temporarily appointed Minister for Transport and Tourism, before taking charge of the new Department of Energy. During his brief tenure, he blocked the Nuclear Energy Board's controversial plan to build a nuclear power plant at Carnsore Point in County Wexford.

=== Later career ===
Fianna Fáil lost power at the 1981 general election when a short-lived Fine Gael-Labour Party coalition government took office. Haughey delayed naming a new opposition front bench, but Colley was still a key member of the Fianna Fáil hierarchy.

Fianna Fáil regained office at the February 1982 general election, but there was disquiet about Haughey's leadership and the failure to secure an overall majority. Colley demanded the same veto as before on Haughey's Defence and Justice appointments, but was refused. When it was revealed that Ray MacSharry would be appointed Tánaiste in his stead, he declined another ministerial position. This effectively brought his front-bench political career to an end, but he remained a vocal critic of the party leadership from the backbenches.

When the Fianna Fáil government collapsed and was replaced by another coalition government after the November 1982 general election, several TDs and Senators expressed a lack of confidence in Haughey's leadership once again. Several unsuccessful leadership challenges took place in late 1982 and early 1983, with Colley now supporting Desmond O'Malley and the Gang of 22 who opposed Haughey.

== Later life and death ==
Colley met Mary Doolan, on Irish-language courses in the Kerry Gaeltacht. They married on 27 September 1950 and had three sons and four daughters, one of whom, Anne Colley, became a TD as a member of the Progressive Democrats party.

Colley died suddenly on 17 September 1983, aged 57, while receiving treatment for a heart condition at Guy's Hospital, London.

== See also ==
- Families in the Oireachtas

Political offices
Preceded by Brian Lenihan	Parliamentary Secretary to the Minister for Lands; 1964–1965	Office abolished
Preceded by Patrick Hillery	Minister for Education; 1965–1966	Succeeded by Donogh O'Malley
Preceded by Patrick Hillery	Minister for Industry and Commerce; 1966–1970	Succeeded by Patrick Lalor
Preceded by Pádraig Faulkner	Minister for the Gaeltacht; 1969–1973	Succeeded by Tom O'Donnell
Preceded by Charles Haughey	Minister for Finance; 1970–1973	Succeeded by Richie Ryan
Preceded by Brendan Corish	Tánaiste; 1977–1981	Succeeded by Michael O'Leary
Preceded by Richie Ryan	Minister for Finance; 1977–1979	Succeeded by Michael O'Kennedy
Preceded by Richie Ryan	Minister for the Public Service; 1977–1979	Succeeded by Michael O'Kennedy
Preceded by Pádraig Faulkner	Minister for Tourism and Transport; 1979–1980	Succeeded by Albert Reynolds
Preceded by Michael O'Kennedy	Minister for Energy; 1980–1981	Succeeded by Michael O'Leary
Party political offices
Preceded by Joseph Brennan	Deputy leader of Fianna Fáil; 1977–1982	Succeeded by Ray MacSharry

Dáil	Election	Deputy (Party)	Deputy (Party)	Deputy (Party)	Deputy (Party)	Deputy (Party)
9th	1937	Alfie Byrne (Ind.)	Oscar Traynor (FF)	James Larkin (Ind.)	3 seats 1937–1948	
10th	1938	Alfie Byrne (Ind.)	Oscar Traynor (FF)	Richard Mulcahy (FG)	3 seats 1937–1948	
11th	1943	Alfie Byrne (Ind.)	Oscar Traynor (FF)	James Larkin (Lab)	3 seats 1937–1948	
12th	1944	Alfie Byrne (Ind.)	Oscar Traynor (FF)	Harry Colley (FF)	3 seats 1937–1948	
13th	1948	Alfie Byrne (Ind.)	Oscar Traynor (FF)	Harry Colley (FF)	Jack Belton (FG)	Peadar Cowan (CnaP)
14th	1951	Alfie Byrne (Ind.)	Oscar Traynor (FF)	Harry Colley (FF)	Jack Belton (FG)	Peadar Cowan (Ind.)
15th	1954	Alfie Byrne (Ind.)	Oscar Traynor (FF)	Harry Colley (FF)	Jack Belton (FG)	Denis Larkin (Lab)
15th	1956 by-election	Patrick Byrne (FG)	Oscar Traynor (FF)	Harry Colley (FF)	Jack Belton (FG)	Denis Larkin (Lab)
16th	1957	Patrick Byrne (FG)	Oscar Traynor (FF)	Charles Haughey (FF)	Jack Belton (FG)	Denis Larkin (Lab)
17th	1961	Patrick Byrne (FG)	George Colley (FF)	Charles Haughey (FF)	Jack Belton (FG)	Eugene Timmons (FF)
17th	1963 by-election	Patrick Byrne (FG)	George Colley (FF)	Charles Haughey (FF)	Paddy Belton (FG)	Eugene Timmons (FF)
18th	1965	Patrick Byrne (FG)	George Colley (FF)	Charles Haughey (FF)	Paddy Belton (FG)	Denis Larkin (Lab)
19th	1969	Conor Cruise O'Brien (Lab)	Eugene Timmons (FF)	Charles Haughey (FF)	Paddy Belton (FG)	4 seats 1969–1977
20th	1973	Conor Cruise O'Brien (Lab)	Eugene Timmons (FF)	Charles Haughey (FF)	Paddy Belton (FG)	4 seats 1969–1977
21st	1977	Constituency abolished				

Dáil	Election	Deputy (Party)	Deputy (Party)	Deputy (Party)	Deputy (Party)
22nd	1981	Michael Woods (FF)	Liam Fitzgerald (FF)	Seán Dublin Bay Rockall Loftus (Ind.)	Michael Joe Cosgrave (FG)
23rd	1982 (Feb)	Michael Woods (FF)	Maurice Manning (FG)	Ned Brennan (FF)	Michael Joe Cosgrave (FG)
24th	1982 (Nov)	Michael Woods (FF)	Maurice Manning (FG)	Liam Fitzgerald (FF)	Michael Joe Cosgrave (FG)
25th	1987	Michael Woods (FF)	Pat McCartan (WP)	Liam Fitzgerald (FF)	Michael Joe Cosgrave (FG)
26th	1989	Michael Woods (FF)	Pat McCartan (WP)	Liam Fitzgerald (FF)	Michael Joe Cosgrave (FG)
27th	1992	Michael Woods (FF)	Tommy Broughan (Lab)	Liam Fitzgerald (FF)	Seán Kenny (Lab)
28th	1997	Michael Woods (FF)	Tommy Broughan (Lab)	Martin Brady (FF)	Michael Joe Cosgrave (FG)
29th	2002	Michael Woods (FF)	Tommy Broughan (Lab)	Martin Brady (FF)	3 seats from 2002
30th	2007	Michael Woods (FF)	Tommy Broughan (Lab)	Terence Flanagan (FG)	3 seats from 2002
31st	2011	Seán Kenny (Lab)	Tommy Broughan (Lab)	Terence Flanagan (FG)	3 seats from 2002
32nd	2016	Constituency abolished. See Dublin Bay North			

Dáil	Election	Deputy (Party)	Deputy (Party)	Deputy (Party)	Deputy (Party)
13th	1948	Vivion de Valera (FF)	Martin O'Sullivan (Lab)	Patrick McGilligan (FG)	3 seats 1948–1961
14th	1951	Vivion de Valera (FF)	Colm Gallagher (FF)	Patrick McGilligan (FG)	3 seats 1948–1961
15th	1954	Vivion de Valera (FF)	Maureen O'Carroll (Lab)	Patrick McGilligan (FG)	3 seats 1948–1961
16th	1957	Vivion de Valera (FF)	Colm Gallagher (FF)	Patrick McGilligan (FG)	3 seats 1948–1961
16th	1957 by-election	Vivion de Valera (FF)	Frank Sherwin (Ind.)	Patrick McGilligan (FG)	3 seats 1948–1961
17th	1961	Vivion de Valera (FF)	Frank Sherwin (Ind.)	Patrick McGilligan (FG)	Celia Lynch (FF)
18th	1965	Vivion de Valera (FF)	Michael O'Leary (Lab)	Luke Belton (FG)	Celia Lynch (FF)
19th	1969	George Colley (FF)	Michael O'Leary (Lab)	Luke Belton (FG)	Celia Lynch (FF)
20th	1973	George Colley (FF)	Michael O'Leary (Lab)	Luke Belton (FG)	Celia Lynch (FF)
21st	1977	Vincent Brady (FF)	Michael O'Leary (Lab)	Michael Keating (FG)	3 seats 1977–1981
22nd	1981	Vincent Brady (FF)	Charles Haughey (FF)	Noël Browne (SLP)	George Birmingham (FG)
23rd	1982 (Feb)	Vincent Brady (FF)	Charles Haughey (FF)	Richard Bruton (FG)	George Birmingham (FG)
24th	1982 (Nov)	Vincent Brady (FF)	Charles Haughey (FF)	Richard Bruton (FG)	George Birmingham (FG)
25th	1987	Vincent Brady (FF)	Charles Haughey (FF)	Richard Bruton (FG)	George Birmingham (FG)
26th	1989	Vincent Brady (FF)	Charles Haughey (FF)	Richard Bruton (FG)	Ivor Callely (FF)
27th	1992	Seán Haughey (FF)	Derek McDowell (Lab)	Richard Bruton (FG)	Ivor Callely (FF)
28th	1997	Seán Haughey (FF)	Derek McDowell (Lab)	Richard Bruton (FG)	Ivor Callely (FF)
29th	2002	Seán Haughey (FF)	Finian McGrath (Ind.)	Richard Bruton (FG)	Ivor Callely (FF)
30th	2007	Seán Haughey (FF)	Finian McGrath (Ind.)	Richard Bruton (FG)	3 seats from 2007
31st	2011	Aodhán Ó Ríordáin (Lab)	Finian McGrath (Ind.)	Richard Bruton (FG)	3 seats from 2007
32nd	2016	Constituency abolished. See Dublin Bay North			

Dáil	Election	Deputy (Party)	Deputy (Party)	Deputy (Party)
21st	1977	George Colley (FF)	Michael Woods (FF)	Michael Joe Cosgrave (FG)
22nd	1981	Constituency abolished		

Dáil	Election	Deputy (Party)	Deputy (Party)	Deputy (Party)	Deputy (Party)
19th	1969	Frank Cluskey (Lab)	Vivion de Valera (FF)	Thomas J. Fitzpatrick (FF)	Maurice E. Dockrell (FG)
20th	1973	Frank Cluskey (Lab)	Vivion de Valera (FF)	Thomas J. Fitzpatrick (FF)	Maurice E. Dockrell (FG)
21st	1977	Constituency abolished			

Dáil	Election	Deputy (Party)	Deputy (Party)	Deputy (Party)	Deputy (Party)	Deputy (Party)
22nd	1981	Bertie Ahern (FF)	Michael Keating (FG)	Alice Glenn (FG)	Michael O'Leary (Lab)	George Colley (FF)
23rd	1982 (Feb)	Bertie Ahern (FF)	Michael Keating (FG)	Tony Gregory (Ind.)	Michael O'Leary (Lab)	George Colley (FF)
24th	1982 (Nov)	Bertie Ahern (FF)	Michael Keating (FG)	Tony Gregory (Ind.)	Alice Glenn (FG)	George Colley (FF)
24th	1983 by-election	Bertie Ahern (FF)	Michael Keating (FG)	Tony Gregory (Ind.)	Alice Glenn (FG)	Tom Leonard (FF)
25th	1987	Bertie Ahern (FF)	Michael Keating (PDs)	Tony Gregory (Ind.)	Dermot Fitzpatrick (FF)	John Stafford (FF)
26th	1989	Bertie Ahern (FF)	Pat Lee (FG)	Tony Gregory (Ind.)	Dermot Fitzpatrick (FF)	John Stafford (FF)
27th	1992	Bertie Ahern (FF)	Jim Mitchell (FG)	Tony Gregory (Ind.)	Joe Costello (Lab)	4 seats 1992–2016
28th	1997	Bertie Ahern (FF)	Jim Mitchell (FG)	Tony Gregory (Ind.)	Marian McGennis (FF)	4 seats 1992–2016
29th	2002	Bertie Ahern (FF)	Dermot Fitzpatrick (FF)	Tony Gregory (Ind.)	Joe Costello (Lab)	4 seats 1992–2016
30th	2007	Bertie Ahern (FF)	Cyprian Brady (FF)	Tony Gregory (Ind.)	Joe Costello (Lab)	4 seats 1992–2016
30th	2009 by-election	Bertie Ahern (FF)	Cyprian Brady (FF)	Maureen O'Sullivan (Ind.)	Joe Costello (Lab)	4 seats 1992–2016
31st	2011	Mary Lou McDonald (SF)	Paschal Donohoe (FG)	Maureen O'Sullivan (Ind.)	Joe Costello (Lab)	4 seats 1992–2016
32nd	2016	Mary Lou McDonald (SF)	Paschal Donohoe (FG)	Maureen O'Sullivan (Ind.)	3 seats 2016–2020	
33rd	2020	Mary Lou McDonald (SF)	Paschal Donohoe (FG)	Gary Gannon (SD)	Neasa Hourigan (GP)	4 seats from 2020
34th	2024	Mary Lou McDonald (SF)	Paschal Donohoe (FG)	Gary Gannon (SD)	Marie Sherlock (Lab)	4 seats from 2020
34th	2026 by-election	Mary Lou McDonald (SF)	Daniel Ennis (SD)	Gary Gannon (SD)	Marie Sherlock (Lab)	4 seats from 2020
