= Donogh O'Malley =

Irish politician and rugby union footballer (1921–1968)

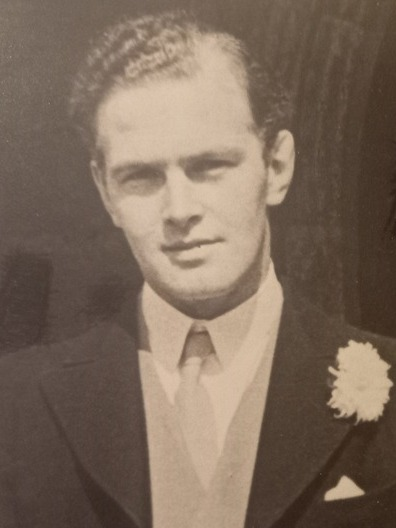
- O'Malley in 1947

Minister for Education
- In office 13 July 1966 – 10 March 1968
- Taoiseach: Jack Lynch
- Preceded by: George Colley
- Succeeded by: Brian Lenihan

Minister for Health
- In office 21 April 1965 – 13 July 1966
- Taoiseach: Jack Lynch
- Preceded by: Seán MacEntee
- Succeeded by: Seán Flanagan

Parliamentary Secretary
- 1961–1965: Finance

Teachta Dála
- In office May 1954 – 10 March 1968
- Constituency: Limerick East

Personal details
- Born: 18 January 1921 Limerick, Ireland
- Died: 10 March 1968 (aged 47) Limerick, Ireland
- Party: Fianna Fáil
- Spouse: Hilda Moriarty (m. 1947)
- Children: 2, including Daragh
- Relatives: Desmond O'Malley (nephew); Tim O'Malley (distant cousin); Fiona O'Malley (grandniece)
- Education: University College Galway

Donogh Brendan O'Malley (18 January 1921 – 10 March 1968) was an Irish Fianna Fáil politician and rugby union player who served as Minister for Education from 1966 to 1968, Minister for Health from 1965 to 1966 and Parliamentary Secretary to the Minister for Finance from 1961 to 1965. He served as a Teachta Dála (TD) for the Limerick East constituency from 1954 to 1968.

He is best remembered as the Minister who introduced free secondary school education in the Republic of Ireland.

== Early and private life ==
O'Malley was born in Limerick on 18 January 1921, one of eight surviving children of Joseph O'Malley, civil engineer, and his wife, Mary "Cis" (née Tooher). Born into a wealthy middle-class family, he was educated by the Jesuits at Crescent College and later at Clongowes Wood College, County Kildare. He later studied at University College Galway (UCG), where he was conferred with a degree in civil engineering in 1943. He later returned to Limerick, where he worked as an engineer before becoming involved in politics.

=== Rugby ===
O'Malley played rugby at provincial level for Munster, Leinster and Connacht and at club level for Bohemians and Shannon RFC. His chances at an international career were ruined by the suspension of international fixtures during World War II. It was at a rugby match in Tralee that he first met Dr. Hilda Moriarty (1922–1991), who he would go on to marry in August 1947. Moriarty was from a Gaeltacht area in Daingean Ui Chuis, County Kerry, and assisted him with the Irish language segments of his speeches. The couple had two children: the actor Daragh O'Malley, and Suzanne, a fashion designer. O'Malley's wife is famous as Patrick Kavanagh's ideal love in the poem "On Raglan Road". Prior to meeting Hilda, O'Malley had been engaged to Audrey Harris (sister of the actor Richard Harris) who died at the age of 21.

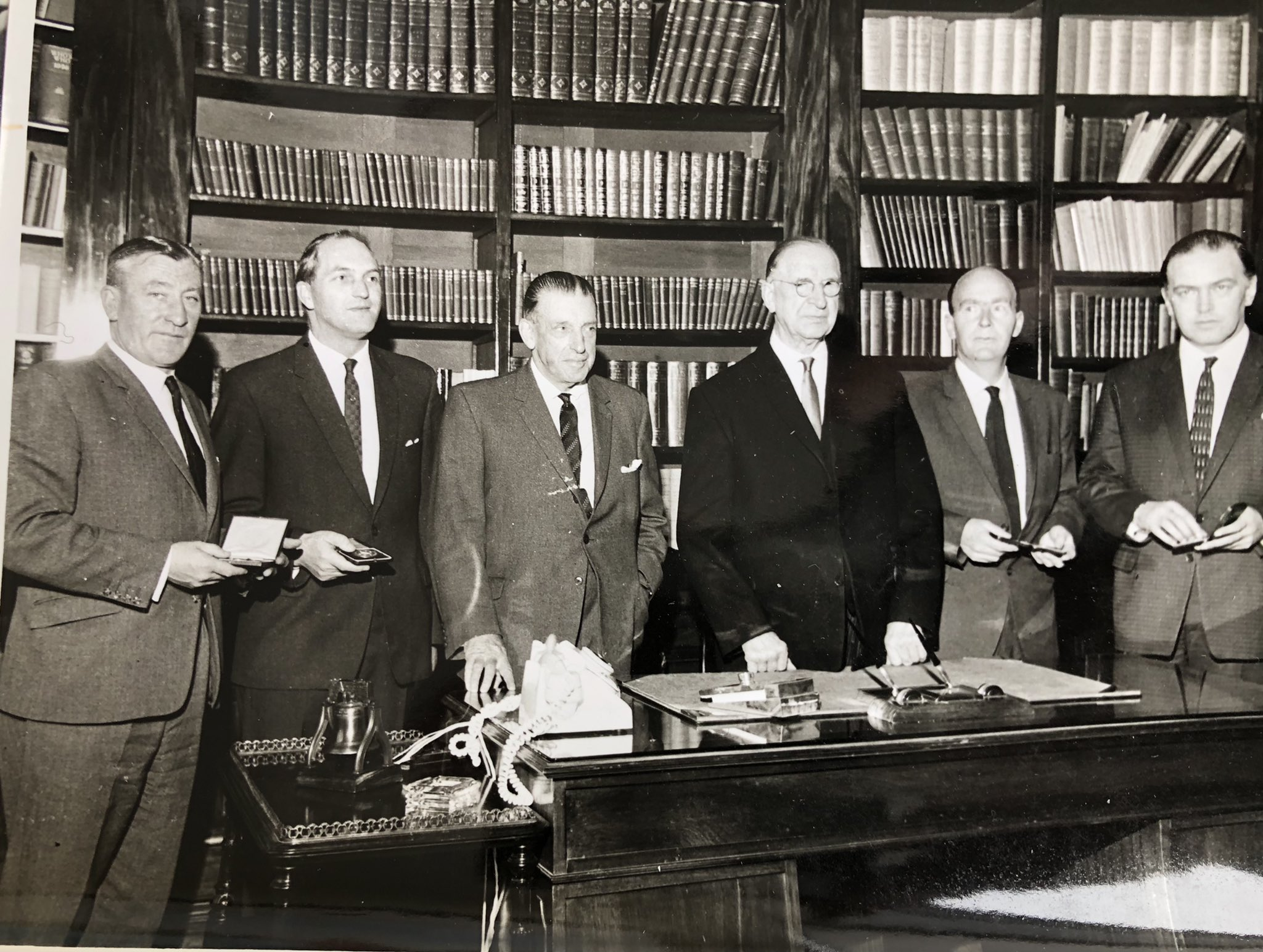
O'Malley appointed to cabinet in April 1965

== Early political career ==
Although O'Malley ran as a Fianna Fáil candidate (the party which emerged from the anti-Treaty side in the Irish Civil War), he was born into a politically active family who supported Cumann na nGaedheal (the party which emerged from the pro-Treaty side) until a falling-out with the party in the early 1930s. He first became involved in local politics as a member of Limerick Corporation. He became Mayor of Limerick in 1961, the third O'Malley brother to hold the office (Desmond O'Malley was mayor from 1941 to 1943, and Michael O'Malley from 1948 to 1949). O'Malley was a strong electoral performer, topping the poll in every general election he ran in.

Donogh O'Malley was first elected to Dáil Éireann as a Fianna Fáil TD for Limerick East at the 1954 general election; Fianna Fáil was not returned to government on that occasion. He spent the rest of the decade on the backbenches; however, his party was returned to power in 1957. Two years later, the modernising process began when Seán Lemass took over from Éamon de Valera as Taoiseach. Lemass introduced younger cabinet ministers, as the old guard who had served the party since its foundation in 1926 began to retire.

In 1961, O'Malley joined the government as Parliamentary Secretary to the Minister for Finance. O'Malley was part of a new, brasher style of politician that emerged in the 1960s, sometimes nicknamed "the men in the mohair suits". It was expected that this generation of politician, born after the Civil War, would be a modernising force in post-de Valera Ireland.

Although his sporting background was in rugby and swimming, it was association football which O'Malley got involved in at a leadership level, becoming President of the Football Association of Ireland despite never having played the sport.

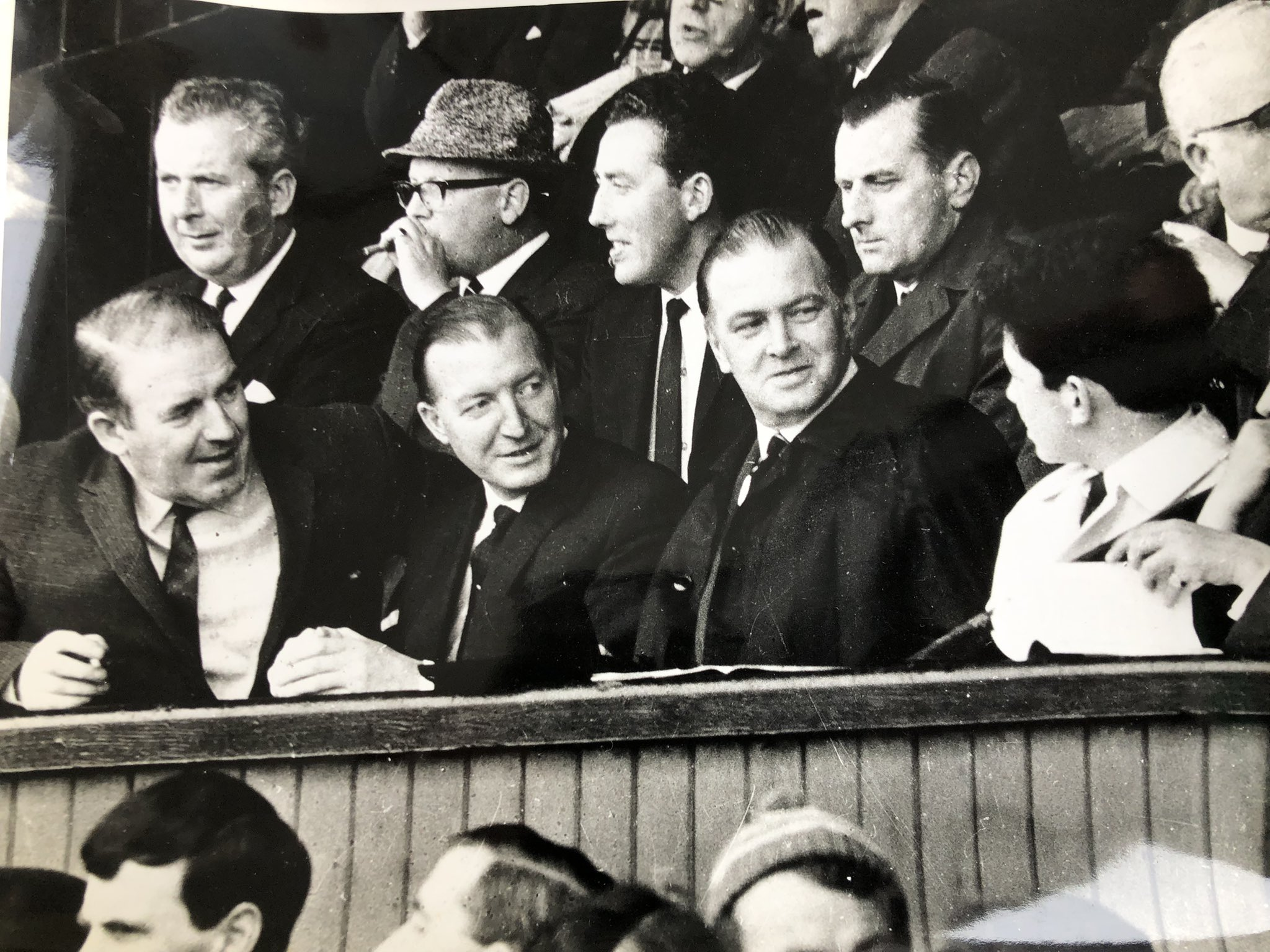
O'Malley attends his first football match as President of the Football Association of Ireland at Dalymount Park. With Neil Blaney, Charles Haughey and his son, Daragh.

== Cabinet career ==
Following Fianna Fáil's retention of power in the 1965 general election, O'Malley joined the cabinet as Minister for Health. He spent just over a year in this position before he was appointed Minister for Education, a position in which he displayed renowned dynamism. Having succeeded another dynamic young minister, Patrick Hillery (a political ally and friend who had attended medical school with O'Malley's wife, Hilda) he resolved to act swiftly to introduce the recommendations of an official report on education.

As Minister for Education, O'Malley extended the school transport scheme and commissioned the building of new non-denominational comprehensive and community schools in areas where they were needed. He introduced Regional Technical Colleges (RTCs), now called Institutes of Technology, in areas where there was no third level college. The best example of this policy is the University of Limerick, originally an Institute of Higher Education, where O'Malley is credited with taking the steps to ensure that it became a university. His plan to merge Trinity College Dublin and University College Dublin aroused huge controversy, and was not successful, despite being supported by his cabinet colleague Brian Lenihan. Access to third-level education was also extended, the old scholarship system being replaced by a system of means-tested grants that gave easier access to students without well-off parents.

=== Free secondary school education ===
Mid-twentieth century Ireland experienced significant emigration, especially to the neighbouring United Kingdom where, in addition to employment opportunities, there was a better state provision of education and healthcare. Social change in Ireland and policies intending to correct this deficit were often met with strong resistance, such as Noël Browne's proposed Mother and Child Scheme. As a former Health Minister, O'Malley had first-hand experience of running the department which had attempted to introduce this scheme and understood the processes that caused it to fail, such as resistance from Department of Finance and John Charles McQuaid. This influenced his strategy in presenting the free-education proposal.

Shortly after O'Malley was appointed, he announced that from 1969 all education up to Intermediate Certificate level would be without cost, and free buses would bring students in rural areas to their nearest school. O'Malley seems to have made this decision himself without consulting other ministers; however, he did discuss it with Lemass. Jack Lynch—who, as Minister for Finance, had to find the money to pay for the programme—was not consulted and was dismayed at the announcement.

On 10 September 1966, O'Malley addressed a dinner of the National Union of Journalists in which he publicly revealed the scheme.

"I propose therefore, from the coming school year, beginning in September of next year, to introduce a scheme whereby, up to the completion of the Intermediate Certificate course, the opportunity for free post-primary education will be available to all families."

"This free education will be available in the comprehensive and vocational schools, and in the general run of secondary schools. I say the general run of secondary schools because there will still be schools, charging higher fees, who may not opt to take my scheme; and the parent who wants to send his child to one of these schools and pay the fees will of course be free to do so.

"Going on from there, I intend also to make provision whereby no pupil will, for lack of means, be prevented from continuing his or her education up to the end of the Leaving Certificate course. Further, I propose that assistance towards the cost of books and accessories will be given, through the period of his or her course, to the student on whom it would be a hardship to meet all such costs".

By announcing the decision first to journalists and on a Saturday (during a month when the Dáil was in recess), the positive public reaction would temper resistance to the idea before the next cabinet meeting. O'Malley's proposals were hugely popular with the public, and it was impossible for the government to go back on his word.

Some Irish commentators consider that O'Malley's extension of education, changing Ireland from a land where the majority were schooled only to the age of 14 to a country with universal secondary-school education, indirectly led to the Celtic Tiger boom of the 1990s-2000s when it was followed for some years by an extension of free education to primary degree level in university, a scheme that was launched in 1996 by the Labour Party and axed in 2009 by Fianna Fáil's Batt O'Keeffe.

=== The Kennedy Report ===
In 1967 O’Malley appointed Justice Eileen Kennedy to chair a committee to carry out a survey and report on the reformatory and industrial school systems. The report, which was published in 1970, was considered ground-breaking in many areas and came to be known as the Kennedy Report.

The Report made recommendations about a number of matters, including the Magdalene laundries, in relation to which they were not acted upon. The report recommended the closure of a number of reformatories, including the latterly infamous reformatory at Daingean, County Offaly.

== Death ==
O'Malley's reforms made him one of the most popular members of the government; he was affectionately known as 'the School Man' for his work in education. His sudden death in Limerick on 10 March 1968, before his vision for the education system was completed, came as a shock to the public. He was buried with a full Irish state funeral.

Following his death, his widow, Hilda O'Malley, did not run in the subsequent by-election for the seat he had left vacant. It was won narrowly by their nephew Desmond O'Malley. Hilda sought the Fianna Fáil nomination for the 1969 general election, but Fianna Fáil gave the party nomination to Desmond, as the sitting TD. Hilda O'Malley ran as an Independent candidate in that election; after what proved a bitter campaign against her nephew, she failed to get the fourth seat in Limerick East by just 200 votes.

== See also ==
- Families in the Oireachtas
- List of Irish state funerals

Civic offices
Preceded by Patrick Kelly	Mayor of Limerick; 1961	Succeeded by Frank Glasgow
Political offices
Preceded by Joseph Brennan	Parliamentary Secretary to the Minister for Finance; 1961–1965	Succeeded by Jim Gibbons
Preceded by Seán MacEntee	Minister for Health; 1965–1966	Succeeded by Seán Flanagan
Preceded by George Colley	Minister for Education; 1966–1968	Succeeded by Brian Lenihan

Dáil	Election	Deputy (Party)	Deputy (Party)	Deputy (Party)	Deputy (Party)	Deputy (Party)
13th	1948	Michael Keyes (Lab)	Robert Ryan (FF)	James Reidy (FG)	Daniel Bourke (FF)	4 seats 1948–1981
14th	1951	Michael Keyes (Lab)	Tadhg Crowley (FF)	James Reidy (FG)	Daniel Bourke (FF)	4 seats 1948–1981
14th	1952 by-election	Michael Keyes (Lab)	Tadhg Crowley (FF)	James Reidy (FG)	John Carew (FG)	4 seats 1948–1981
15th	1954	Michael Keyes (Lab)	Tadhg Crowley (FF)	Donogh O'Malley (FF)	John Carew (FG)	4 seats 1948–1981
16th	1957	Ted Russell (Ind.)	Paddy Clohessy (FF)	Donogh O'Malley (FF)	John Carew (FG)	4 seats 1948–1981
17th	1961	Stephen Coughlan (Lab)	Paddy Clohessy (FF)	Donogh O'Malley (FF)	Tom O'Donnell (FG)	4 seats 1948–1981
18th	1965	Stephen Coughlan (Lab)	Paddy Clohessy (FF)	Donogh O'Malley (FF)	Tom O'Donnell (FG)	4 seats 1948–1981
18th	1968 by-election	Stephen Coughlan (Lab)	Paddy Clohessy (FF)	Desmond O'Malley (FF)	Tom O'Donnell (FG)	4 seats 1948–1981
19th	1969	Stephen Coughlan (Lab)	Michael Herbert (FF)	Desmond O'Malley (FF)	Tom O'Donnell (FG)	4 seats 1948–1981
20th	1973	Stephen Coughlan (Lab)	Michael Herbert (FF)	Desmond O'Malley (FF)	Tom O'Donnell (FG)	4 seats 1948–1981
21st	1977	Michael Lipper (Ind.)	Michael Herbert (FF)	Desmond O'Malley (FF)	Tom O'Donnell (FG)	4 seats 1948–1981
22nd	1981	Jim Kemmy (Ind.)	Peadar Clohessy (FF)	Desmond O'Malley (FF)	Tom O'Donnell (FG)	Michael Noonan (FG)
23rd	1982 (Feb)	Jim Kemmy (DSP)	Willie O'Dea (FF)	Desmond O'Malley (FF)	Tom O'Donnell (FG)	Michael Noonan (FG)
24th	1982 (Nov)	Frank Prendergast (Lab)	Willie O'Dea (FF)	Desmond O'Malley (FF)	Tom O'Donnell (FG)	Michael Noonan (FG)
25th	1987	Jim Kemmy (DSP)	Willie O'Dea (FF)	Desmond O'Malley (PDs)	Peadar Clohessy (PDs)	Michael Noonan (FG)
26th	1989	Jim Kemmy (DSP)	Willie O'Dea (FF)	Desmond O'Malley (PDs)	Peadar Clohessy (PDs)	Michael Noonan (FG)
27th	1992	Jim Kemmy (Lab)	Willie O'Dea (FF)	Desmond O'Malley (PDs)	Peadar Clohessy (PDs)	Michael Noonan (FG)
28th	1997	Jim Kemmy (Lab)	Willie O'Dea (FF)	Desmond O'Malley (PDs)	Eddie Wade (FF)	Michael Noonan (FG)
28th	1998 by-election	Jan O'Sullivan (Lab)	Willie O'Dea (FF)	Desmond O'Malley (PDs)	Eddie Wade (FF)	Michael Noonan (FG)
29th	2002	Jan O'Sullivan (Lab)	Willie O'Dea (FF)	Tim O'Malley (PDs)	Peter Power (FF)	Michael Noonan (FG)
30th	2007	Jan O'Sullivan (Lab)	Willie O'Dea (FF)	Kieran O'Donnell (FG)	Peter Power (FF)	Michael Noonan (FG)
31st	2011	Constituency abolished. See Limerick City and Limerick				
