= 1979 Fianna Fáil leadership election =

- 7 December 1979
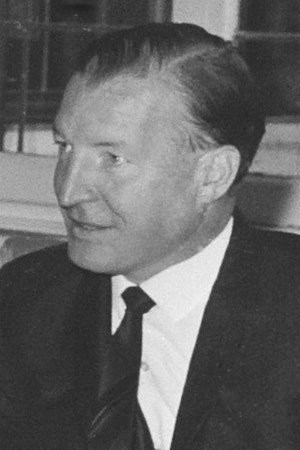

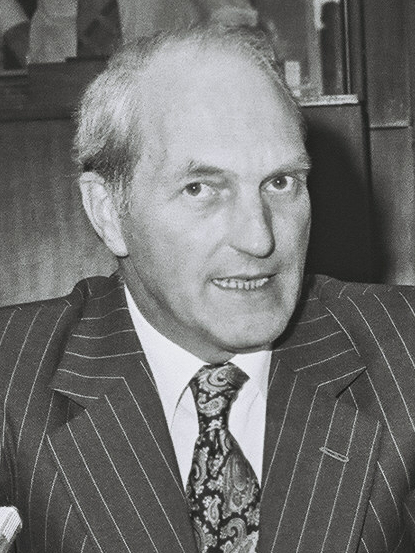
Candidate	Charles Haughey	George Colley
Percentage	54%	46%
Leader before election
Jack Lynch
Elected Leader
Charles Haughey

The 1979 Fianna Fáil leadership election began in December 1979, when Jack Lynch resigned as party leader and Taoiseach. Lynch had been party leader for thirteen years and Taoiseach for over nine years. His successor was elected by the members of the Fianna Fáil parliamentary party on 7 December 1979. After one ballot the election was won by Charles Haughey.

== Candidates ==
=== Standing ===
- Charles Haughey, Minister for Health and Social Welfare
- George Colley, Tánaiste and Minister for Finance

=== Declined to stand ===
- Desmond O'Malley, Minister for Industry and Commerce

== Campaign ==
Following a landslide election victory at the 1977 general election the fortunes of Jack Lynch had turned around completely. The economy began to deteriorate, internal divisions within Fianna Fáil became apparent, party discipline and morale was beginning to break down as pressure mounted on Lynch to step aside. Perhaps the biggest blow to the Taoiseach's confidence came when the party lost two by-elections in November 1979: Lynch's own constituency of Cork City and Cork North-East.

Upon hearing this, Lynch decided that the time was right for him to resign. It is believed that he had intended to resign in any case, with the date of 7 January 1980 pencilled in. This would certainly seem plausible as it would allow him to fulfill his term as president of the European Economic Community. However, nothing had been made definite. It is also believed that Lynch's favoured successor and Tánaiste, George Colley, went to Lynch and urged him to resign early. Colley, and his supporters, believed that he had enough votes to win a leadership contest, and they thought that the unexpected resignation of the Taoiseach would catch any other potential candidates off guard. Lynch agreed to this measure as he believed that Colley would succeed him. As a result of this, Jack Lynch resigned as leader of Fianna Fáil on Wednesday, 5 December 1979. The election to decide his successor was planned to take place two days later.

The contest that developed was a two-horse race between the Tánaiste and Minister for Finance, George Colley, and the Minister for Health and Social Welfare, Charles Haughey. The men were like chalk and cheese. Colley came from the traditional wing of Fianna Fáil. His father, Henry, had been a founder-member of the party and Colley was concerned with the fundamental aims of the party, such as the restoration of the Irish language. Haughey on the other hand was a self-made politician. He was a prominent cabinet minister in the 1960s and was very much the representative of the new wing of Fianna Fáil. In spite of these differences the two main had some similarities. Both Colley and Haughey were in the same class at school, they attended the same university, they both became members of Fianna Fáil at the same time and they both represented the same constituency at one time.

The support for both candidates was about even up until the very end, however there was one vital difference. Colley had the support of virtually the entire Cabinet, while Haughey had the support of the majority of backbench TDs. While Colley believed that a short campaign would take his opponent by surprise, Haughey had been anticipating this moment for many years. A group known as the "gang of five", which consisted of Tom McEllistrim, Mark Killilea Jnr, Seán Doherty, Jackie Fahey and Albert Reynolds, had tried to whip up support for Haughey within the party for the previous few months, as they had anticipated that a change of leadership was imminent.

The secret ballot to decide the new leader took place on Friday, 7 December 1979 in the Fianna Fáil parliamentary party room at Leinster House. On the night before the vote the candidates were neck and neck, and both Colley and Haughey were confident of success. However, at the eleventh hour the Foreign Minister, Michael O'Kennedy, who up until then had supported Colley, switched sides and was now advocating Haughey for the leadership. This was a major blow to Colley's campaign. Haughey emerged as the victor with 44 votes to Colley's 38 votes. Nine years after the Arms Crisis nearly destroyed his political career, Charles Haughey was elected leader of Fianna Fáil in a backbench revolt.

The transition of power from Lynch to Haughey was not a smooth one however. Colley was hugely disappointed, having failed in his second attempt to become leader of Fianna Fáil. He demanded, and was granted, a veto from Haughey over the new Taoiseach's appointments to the posts of Minister for Defence and Minister for Justice. However, Colley, while retaining the post of Tánaiste, was moved from his position as Minister for Finance. Some of Colley's supporters were also disillusioned at the outcome. Martin O'Donoghue and possibly Desmond O'Malley even considered voting against Haughey for the position of Taoiseach, however, they accepted that he had won for the time being.

Four days after the ballot, on 11 December, Haughey was elected Taoiseach by Dáil Éireann, however, he endured six hours of criticism from other TDs, including Fine Gael leader Garret FitzGerald who complained about Haughey's "flawed pedigree." In spite of this, Haughey had been elected to the position he had coveted for the last ten years. However, his victory came at a price, as it would lead to almost two decades of party in-fighting, leadership challenges and the need for political power at all costs. However, Haughey's leadership is also associated with the revival of the Irish economy from near extinction the late 1980s.

Election: 7 December 1979
Candidate	Votes	%
Charles Haughey	44	54%
George Colley	38	46%
Turnout	82	100%
Result: Haughey elected leader
