= Harry Colley =

Irish politician (1891–1972)

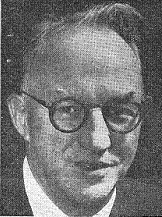
- Colley in 1954

Senator
- In office 22 May 1957 – 14 December 1961
- Constituency: Labour Panel

Teachta Dála
- In office May 1944 – March 1957
- Constituency: Dublin North-East

Personal details
- Born: Henry Edward Colley; 21 February 1891 Dublin, Ireland
- Died: 18 January 1972 (aged 80) Dublin, Ireland
- Party: Fianna Fáil
- Spouse: Christina Nugent (m. 1914)
- Children: 7, including George
- Relatives: Anne Colley (granddaughter)
- Education: Synge Street CBS

Military service
- Branch/service: Irish Volunteers; Irish Republican Army; Anti-Treaty IRA
- Rank: Adjutant
- Battles/wars: Easter Rising; Irish War of Independence; Irish Civil War

Henry Edward Colley (21 February 1891 – 18 January 1972) was an Irish Fianna Fáil politician who served as a Teachta Dála (TD) for the Dublin North-East constituency from 1944 to 1957. He was also a Senator for the Labour Panel from 1957 to 1961.

== Early life and revolutionary period ==
He joined the Irish Volunteers in 1913, serving in the GPO garrison during the 1916 Easter Rising; British troops, believing him dead, used his body as a sandbag on their Gloucester Street barricade. He was imprisoned at Frongoch internment camp, and was released in December 1916; becoming second-in-command to Oscar Traynor in F Company, 2nd Battalion, Dublin Brigade Irish Republican Army (IRA) Colley served as Brigade Adjutant, Dublin Brigade IRA in 1920–1921 period was prominent in the attack on the Custom House on 25 May 1921.

Opposed to the Anglo-Irish Treaty, he took the anti-Treaty side in the Irish Civil War and was involved in the planning and organising of IRA operations against National forces. He was arrested by National forces on 9 August 1922, interned at Newbridge, County Kildare, where he went on hunger strike and was released in March 1923. Colley was later awarded a pension by the Irish government under the Military Service Pensions Act, 1934 for his service with Irish Volunteers and the IRA between 1916 and 1923.

== Politics ==
A founder member of Fianna Fáil, he was a leading member of its national executive and its organising committee. Colley was first elected to Dáil Éireann on his second attempt, at the 1944 general election, representing Dublin North-East. He remained a TD until he lost his seat at the 1957 general election, to the future Taoiseach Charles Haughey. Colley was elected to Seanad Éireann for the Labour Panel in 1957. He did not contest the 1961 Seanad election.

He married Christina Nugent on 14 October 1918, and they had five daughters and two sons. One of his sons, George Colley, was elected to the Dáil for the same constituency at the 1961 general election and went on to hold several cabinet positions, including those of Minister for Finance and Tánaiste. He was defeated in the 1979 Fianna Fáil leadership election, by the man who unseated his father, Charles Haughey.

Harry Colley died on 18 January 1972 and was buried with full military honours in the republican plot at Glasnevin Cemetery.

== See also ==
- Families in the Oireachtas

Dáil	Election	Deputy (Party)	Deputy (Party)	Deputy (Party)	Deputy (Party)	Deputy (Party)
9th	1937	Alfie Byrne (Ind.)	Oscar Traynor (FF)	James Larkin (Ind.)	3 seats 1937–1948	
10th	1938	Alfie Byrne (Ind.)	Oscar Traynor (FF)	Richard Mulcahy (FG)	3 seats 1937–1948	
11th	1943	Alfie Byrne (Ind.)	Oscar Traynor (FF)	James Larkin (Lab)	3 seats 1937–1948	
12th	1944	Alfie Byrne (Ind.)	Oscar Traynor (FF)	Harry Colley (FF)	3 seats 1937–1948	
13th	1948	Alfie Byrne (Ind.)	Oscar Traynor (FF)	Harry Colley (FF)	Jack Belton (FG)	Peadar Cowan (CnaP)
14th	1951	Alfie Byrne (Ind.)	Oscar Traynor (FF)	Harry Colley (FF)	Jack Belton (FG)	Peadar Cowan (Ind.)
15th	1954	Alfie Byrne (Ind.)	Oscar Traynor (FF)	Harry Colley (FF)	Jack Belton (FG)	Denis Larkin (Lab)
15th	1956 by-election	Patrick Byrne (FG)	Oscar Traynor (FF)	Harry Colley (FF)	Jack Belton (FG)	Denis Larkin (Lab)
16th	1957	Patrick Byrne (FG)	Oscar Traynor (FF)	Charles Haughey (FF)	Jack Belton (FG)	Denis Larkin (Lab)
17th	1961	Patrick Byrne (FG)	George Colley (FF)	Charles Haughey (FF)	Jack Belton (FG)	Eugene Timmons (FF)
17th	1963 by-election	Patrick Byrne (FG)	George Colley (FF)	Charles Haughey (FF)	Paddy Belton (FG)	Eugene Timmons (FF)
18th	1965	Patrick Byrne (FG)	George Colley (FF)	Charles Haughey (FF)	Paddy Belton (FG)	Denis Larkin (Lab)
19th	1969	Conor Cruise O'Brien (Lab)	Eugene Timmons (FF)	Charles Haughey (FF)	Paddy Belton (FG)	4 seats 1969–1977
20th	1973	Conor Cruise O'Brien (Lab)	Eugene Timmons (FF)	Charles Haughey (FF)	Paddy Belton (FG)	4 seats 1969–1977
21st	1977	Constituency abolished				

Dáil	Election	Deputy (Party)	Deputy (Party)	Deputy (Party)	Deputy (Party)
22nd	1981	Michael Woods (FF)	Liam Fitzgerald (FF)	Seán Dublin Bay Rockall Loftus (Ind.)	Michael Joe Cosgrave (FG)
23rd	1982 (Feb)	Michael Woods (FF)	Maurice Manning (FG)	Ned Brennan (FF)	Michael Joe Cosgrave (FG)
24th	1982 (Nov)	Michael Woods (FF)	Maurice Manning (FG)	Liam Fitzgerald (FF)	Michael Joe Cosgrave (FG)
25th	1987	Michael Woods (FF)	Pat McCartan (WP)	Liam Fitzgerald (FF)	Michael Joe Cosgrave (FG)
26th	1989	Michael Woods (FF)	Pat McCartan (WP)	Liam Fitzgerald (FF)	Michael Joe Cosgrave (FG)
27th	1992	Michael Woods (FF)	Tommy Broughan (Lab)	Liam Fitzgerald (FF)	Seán Kenny (Lab)
28th	1997	Michael Woods (FF)	Tommy Broughan (Lab)	Martin Brady (FF)	Michael Joe Cosgrave (FG)
29th	2002	Michael Woods (FF)	Tommy Broughan (Lab)	Martin Brady (FF)	3 seats from 2002
30th	2007	Michael Woods (FF)	Tommy Broughan (Lab)	Terence Flanagan (FG)	3 seats from 2002
31st	2011	Seán Kenny (Lab)	Tommy Broughan (Lab)	Terence Flanagan (FG)	3 seats from 2002
32nd	2016	Constituency abolished. See Dublin Bay North			
