= 20th Dáil =

TDs from 1977 to 1981

| ← | 19th Dáil | 21st Dáil | → |

Overview
- Legislative body: Dáil Éireann
- Jurisdiction: Ireland
- Meeting place: Leinster House
- Term: 14 March 1973 – 25 May 1977
- Election: 1973 general election
- Government: 14th government of Ireland
- Members: 144
- Ceann Comhairle: Seán Treacy
- Taoiseach: Liam Cosgrave
- Tánaiste: Brendan Corish
- Chief Whip: John Kelly
- Leader of the Opposition: Jack Lynch

Sessions
- 1st: 14 March 1973 – 27 July 1973
- 2nd: 17 October 1973 – 26 July 1974
- 3rd: 23 October 1974 – 30 July 1975
- 4th: 22 October 1975 – 1 July 1976
- 5th: 31 August 1976 – 25 May 1977

The 20th Dáil was elected at the 1973 general election on 28 February 1973 and met on 14 March 1973. The members of Dáil Éireann, the house of representatives of the Oireachtas (legislature) of Ireland, are known as TDs. It sat with the 13th Seanad as the two Houses of the Oireachtas.

On 25 May 1977, President Patrick Hillery dissolved the Dáil on the request of Taoiseach Liam Cosgrave. The 20th Dáil lasted 4 years, 72 days.

== Composition of the 20th Dáil ==
- National Coalition (14th government) parties

| Party | Feb. 1973 | May 1977 | Change |
|---|---|---|---|
| Fianna Fáil | 69 | 66 | ▼3 |
| Fine Gael | 54 | 53 | ▼1 |
| Labour | 19 | 19 | Steady |
| Independent | 2 | 3 | ▲1 |
| Ceann Comhairle | —N/a | 1 | ▲1 |
| Vacant | —N/a | 2 | ▲2 |
| Total | 144 | | |

Fine Gael and the Labour Party formed the 14th government of Ireland, known as the National Coalition, with Liam Cosgrave as Taoiseach and Brendan Corish as Tánaiste.

=== Graphical representation ===
This is a graphical comparison of party strengths in the 20th Dáil from March 1973. This was not the official seating plan.

== Ceann Comhairle ==
On the meeting of the Dáil, Seán Treacy (Lab) was proposed by Liam Cosgrave (FG) and seconded by Brendan Corish (Lab) for the position. His election was approved without a vote.

== TDs by constituency ==
The list of the 144 TDs elected is given in alphabetical order by Dáil constituency.

Members of the 20th Dáil
| Constituency | Name | Party |
|---|---|---|
| Carlow–Kilkenny | Kieran Crotty | Fine Gael |
| Carlow–Kilkenny | Jim Gibbons | Fianna Fáil |
| Carlow–Kilkenny | Desmond Governey | Fine Gael |
| Carlow–Kilkenny | Tom Nolan | Fianna Fáil |
| Carlow–Kilkenny | Séamus Pattison | Labour |
| Cavan | Tom Fitzpatrick | Fine Gael |
| Cavan | Paddy Smith | Fianna Fáil |
| Cavan | John Wilson | Fianna Fáil |
| Clare | Sylvester Barrett | Fianna Fáil |
| Clare | Brendan Daly | Fianna Fáil |
| Clare | Frank Taylor | Fine Gael |
| Clare–South Galway | Johnny Callanan | Fianna Fáil |
| Clare–South Galway | Brigid Hogan-O'Higgins | Fine Gael |
| Clare–South Galway | Bill Loughnane | Fianna Fáil |
| Cork City North-West | Liam Burke | Fine Gael |
| Cork City North-West | Seán French | Fianna Fáil |
| Cork City North-West | Jack Lynch | Fianna Fáil |
| Cork City South-East | Peter Barry | Fine Gael |
| Cork City South-East | Gus Healy | Fianna Fáil |
| Cork City South-East | Pearse Wyse | Fianna Fáil |
| Cork Mid | Donal Creed | Fine Gael |
| Cork Mid | Eileen Desmond | Labour |
| Cork Mid | Gene Fitzgerald | Fianna Fáil |
| Cork Mid | Thomas Meaney | Fianna Fáil |
| Cork North-East | Liam Ahern | Fianna Fáil |
| Cork North-East | Richard Barry | Fine Gael |
| Cork North-East | Jerry Cronin | Fianna Fáil |
| Cork North-East | Patrick Hegarty | Fine Gael |
| Cork South-West | Flor Crowley | Fianna Fáil |
| Cork South-West | Michael Pat Murphy | Labour |
| Cork South-West | John O'Sullivan | Fine Gael |
| Donegal–Leitrim | Joseph Brennan | Fianna Fáil |
| Donegal–Leitrim | Cormac Breslin | Fianna Fáil |
| Donegal–Leitrim | James White | Fine Gael |
| Donegal North-East | Neil Blaney (Note: Blaney was a member of Independent Fianna Fáil.) | Independent |
| Donegal North-East | Liam Cunningham | Fianna Fáil |
| Donegal North-East | Paddy Harte | Fine Gael |
| Dublin Central | Frank Cluskey | Labour |
| Dublin Central | Vivion de Valera | Fianna Fáil |
| Dublin Central | Maurice E. Dockrell | Fine Gael |
| Dublin Central | Tom Fitzpatrick | Fianna Fáil |
| Dublin County North | Ray Burke | Fianna Fáil |
| Dublin County North | Mark Clinton | Fine Gael |
| Dublin County North | Justin Keating | Labour |
| Dublin County North | Seán Walsh | Fianna Fáil |
| Dublin County South | Ruairí Brugha | Fianna Fáil |
| Dublin County South | Richard Burke | Fine Gael |
| Dublin County South | Larry McMahon | Fine Gael |
| Dublin North-Central | Luke Belton | Fine Gael |
| Dublin North-Central | George Colley | Fianna Fáil |
| Dublin North-Central | Celia Lynch | Fianna Fáil |
| Dublin North-Central | Michael O'Leary | Labour |
| Dublin North-East | Paddy Belton | Fine Gael |
| Dublin North-East | Charles Haughey | Fianna Fáil |
| Dublin North-East | Conor Cruise O'Brien | Labour |
| Dublin North-East | Eugene Timmons | Fianna Fáil |
| Dublin North-West | Hugh Byrne | Fine Gael |
| Dublin North-West | Richard Gogan | Fianna Fáil |
| Dublin North-West | David Thornley | Labour |
| Dublin North-West | Jim Tunney | Fianna Fáil |
| Dublin South-Central | Philip Brady | Fianna Fáil |
| Dublin South-Central | Ben Briscoe | Fianna Fáil |
| Dublin South-Central | John Kelly | Fine Gael |
| Dublin South-Central | Richie Ryan | Fine Gael |
| Dublin South-East | Garret FitzGerald | Fine Gael |
| Dublin South-East | Seán Moore | Fianna Fáil |
| Dublin South-East | Fergus O'Brien | Fine Gael |
| Dublin South-West | Declan Costello | Fine Gael |
| Dublin South-West | Joseph Dowling | Fianna Fáil |
| Dublin South-West | Noel Lemass | Fianna Fáil |
| Dublin South-West | John O'Connell | Labour |
| Dún Laoghaire and Rathdown | David Andrews | Fianna Fáil |
| Dún Laoghaire and Rathdown | Liam Cosgrave | Fine Gael |
| Dún Laoghaire and Rathdown | Barry Desmond | Labour |
| Dún Laoghaire and Rathdown | H. Percy Dockrell | Fine Gael |
| Galway North-East | John Donnellan | Fine Gael |
| Galway North-East | Thomas Hussey | Fianna Fáil |
| Galway North-East | Michael F. Kitt | Fianna Fáil |
| Galway West | Fintan Coogan Snr | Fine Gael |
| Galway West | Johnny Geoghegan | Fianna Fáil |
| Galway West | Bobby Molloy | Fianna Fáil |
| Kerry North | Gerard Lynch | Fine Gael |
| Kerry North | Tom McEllistrim | Fianna Fáil |
| Kerry North | Dan Spring | Labour |
| Kerry South | Michael Begley | Fine Gael |
| Kerry South | Timothy O'Connor | Fianna Fáil |
| Kerry South | John O'Leary | Fianna Fáil |
| Kildare | Joseph Bermingham | Labour |
| Kildare | Patrick Malone | Fine Gael |
| Kildare | Paddy Power | Fianna Fáil |
| Laois–Offaly | Ger Connolly | Fianna Fáil |
| Laois–Offaly | Tom Enright | Fine Gael |
| Laois–Offaly | Oliver J. Flanagan | Fine Gael |
| Laois–Offaly | Patrick Lalor | Fianna Fáil |
| Laois–Offaly | Charles McDonald | Fine Gael |
| Limerick East | Stephen Coughlan | Labour |
| Limerick East | Michael Herbert | Fianna Fáil |
| Limerick East | Tom O'Donnell | Fine Gael |
| Limerick East | Desmond O'Malley | Fianna Fáil |
| Limerick West | Gerry Collins | Fianna Fáil |
| Limerick West | Denis Jones | Fine Gael |
| Limerick West | Michael J. Noonan | Fianna Fáil |
| Longford–Westmeath | Frank Carter | Fianna Fáil |
| Longford–Westmeath | Patrick Cooney | Fine Gael |
| Longford–Westmeath | Gerry L'Estrange | Fine Gael |
| Longford–Westmeath | Joe Sheridan | Independent |
| Louth | Paddy Donegan | Fine Gael |
| Louth | Joseph Farrell | Fianna Fáil |
| Louth | Pádraig Faulkner | Fianna Fáil |
| Mayo East | Seán Calleary | Fianna Fáil |
| Mayo East | Martin Finn | Fine Gael |
| Mayo East | Seán Flanagan | Fianna Fáil |
| Mayo West | Denis Gallagher | Fianna Fáil |
| Mayo West | Henry Kenny | Fine Gael |
| Mayo West | Myles Staunton | Fine Gael |
| Meath | John Bruton | Fine Gael |
| Meath | Brendan Crinion | Fianna Fáil |
| Meath | James Tully | Labour |
| Monaghan | Erskine H. Childers | Fianna Fáil |
| Monaghan | John Conlan | Fine Gael |
| Monaghan | Jimmy Leonard | Fianna Fáil |
| Roscommon–Leitrim | Joan Burke | Fine Gael |
| Roscommon–Leitrim | Hugh Gibbons | Fianna Fáil |
| Roscommon–Leitrim | Patrick J. Reynolds | Fine Gael |
| Sligo–Leitrim | Eugene Gilhawley | Fine Gael |
| Sligo–Leitrim | Joseph McLoughlin | Fine Gael |
| Sligo–Leitrim | Ray MacSharry | Fianna Fáil |
| Tipperary North | Thomas Dunne | Fine Gael |
| Tipperary North | Michael O'Kennedy | Fianna Fáil |
| Tipperary North | John Ryan | Labour |
| Tipperary South | Noel Davern | Fianna Fáil |
| Tipperary South | Jackie Fahey | Fianna Fáil |
| Tipperary South | Brendan Griffin | Fine Gael |
| Tipperary South | Seán Treacy | Labour |
| Waterford | Edward Collins | Fine Gael |
| Waterford | Billy Kenneally | Fianna Fáil |
| Waterford | Thomas Kyne | Labour |
| Wexford | Lorcan Allen | Fianna Fáil |
| Wexford | Seán Browne | Fianna Fáil |
| Wexford | Brendan Corish | Labour |
| Wexford | John Esmonde | Fine Gael |
| Wicklow | Liam Kavanagh | Labour |
| Wicklow | Ciarán Murphy | Fianna Fáil |
| Wicklow | Godfrey Timmins | Fine Gael |

== Changes ==
| Date | Constituency | Loss | Gain | Note |
|---|---|---|---|---|
| 14 March 1973 | Tipperary South | Labour | Ceann Comhairle | Seán Treacy takes office as Ceann Comhairle |
| 30 May 1973 | Monaghan | Fianna Fáil | | Erskine H. Childers elected as president of Ireland |
| 27 November 1973 | Monaghan | | Fine Gael | Brendan Toal wins seat vacated by Childers |
| 13 July 1974 | Cork North-East | Fianna Fáil | | Death of Liam Ahern |
| 13 November 1974 | Cork North-East | | Fianna Fáil | Seán Brosnan holds seat vacated by the death of Ahern |
| 24 December 1974 | Galway North-East | Fianna Fáil | | Death of Michael F. Kitt |
| 5 January 1975 | Galway West | Fianna Fáil | | Death of Johnny Geoghegan |
| 4 March 1975 | Galway North-East | | Fianna Fáil | Michael P. Kitt holds seat vacated by the death of his father Michael F. Kitt |
| 4 March 1975 | Galway West | | Fianna Fáil | Máire Geoghegan-Quinn holds seat vacated by the death of her father Johnny Geoghegan |
| 25 September 1975 | Mayo West | Fine Gael | | Death of Henry Kenny |
| 12 November 1975 | Mayo West | | Fine Gael | Enda Kenny holds seat vacated by the death of his father Henry Kenny |
| 29 February 1976 | Donegal North-East | Fianna Fáil | | Death of Liam Cunningham |
| 13 April 1976 | Dublin South-West | Fianna Fáil | | Death of Noel Lemass |
| 28 April 1976 | Dublin North-West | Labour | Independent | David Thornley loses party whip after appearing on Sinn Féin platform during Easter Rising commemorations |
| 10 June 1976 | Donegal North-East | | Independent | Paddy Keaveney gains seat vacated by the death of Cunningham (Note: Keaveney was a member of Independent Fianna Fáil.) |
| 10 June 1976 | Dublin South-West | | Labour | Brendan Halligan gains seat vacated by the death of Lemass |
| 25 January 1977 | Dublin County South | Fine Gael | | Resignation of Richard Burke on nomination as EC Commissioner |
| 2 February 1977 | Dublin North-West | Independent | Labour | David Thornley readmitted to parliamentary party |
| 19 May 1977 | Dublin South-West | Fine Gael | | Resignation of Declan Costello on nomination as High Court judge |
