= Patrick Durcan (politician) =

Irish politician and judge (born 1951)

Senator
- In office 23 February 1983 – 25 April 1987
- Constituency: Nominated

Personal details
- Born: 1951 (age 74–75) County Mayo, Ireland
- Party: Fine Gael
- Education: University College Dublin

Patrick Durcan (born 1951) is an Irish former District Court judge and Fine Gael politician.

Durcan was born in Westport, County Mayo in 1951, and was educated at University College Dublin. He worked as a solicitor from 1973 and sat as a member of Mayo County Council from 1979 to 2004, and also as a member of Westport town council.

Durcan stood for Dáil Éireann as the running mate of future Taoiseach Enda Kenny in Mayo West at the 1981, February 1982, November 1982 and 1987 general elections, but was unsuccessful on each occasion.

He served as a senator in Seanad Éireann from 1983 to 1987. Durcan was nominated by Taoiseach Garret FitzGerald. He was appointed a district judge in November 2011, and retired in May 2021.
