= Denis Gallagher =

Irish politician (1922–2001)

- Gallagher c. 1982

Minister of State
- 1987–1989: Gaeltacht
- Mar.–Oct. 1982: Social Welfare
- 1980–1981: Industry, Commerce and Tourism

Minister for the Gaeltacht
- In office 11 October 1982 – 14 December 1982
- Taoiseach: Charles Haughey
- Preceded by: Pádraig Flynn
- Succeeded by: Paddy O'Toole
- In office 5 July 1977 – 11 December 1979
- Taoiseach: Jack Lynch
- Preceded by: Tom O'Donnell
- Succeeded by: Máire Geoghegan-Quinn

Teachta Dála
- In office February 1973 – June 1989
- Constituency: Mayo West

Personal details
- Born: 29 December 1922 County Mayo, Ireland
- Died: 3 November 2001 (aged 78) County Mayo, Ireland
- Party: Fianna Fáil
- Spouse: Hannah McHugh (m. 1948)
- Children: 12
- Education: St Patrick's College, Dublin

Denis Gallagher (29 December 1922 – 3 November 2001) was an Irish Fianna Fáil politician and community activist who served as Minister for the Gaeltacht on two occasions, from 1977 to 1979 and again briefly in 1982. Born in Currane, on Achill Island in County Mayo, and closely associated throughout his life with the neighbouring community of Achill Island, he trained as a national school teacher before becoming political active in Irish Republican circles in the 1950s, first with Clann na Poblachta and then Sinn Féin. Gallagher was successfully elected to Mayo County Council in 1967 as a member of Fianna Fáil. He was elected to Dáil Éireann for the Mayo West constituency at the 1973 Irish general election, becoming Achill's first TD, and went on to hold the seat until his retirement in 1989.

As Minister for the Gaeltacht, Gallagher's most significant achievement was the establishment of Údarás na Gaeltachta in 1979, a body that combined economic development functions with a cultural and linguistic remit for the Gaeltacht regions. His political career was also shaped by his backing of George Colley in the 1979 Fianna Fáil leadership election, a decision that cost him his cabinet seat when Charles Haughey prevailed. Before entering national politics, Gallagher had been an active figure within the Gaelic Athletic Association in Mayo and Connacht, and a founder of co-operative organisations supporting Achill's fishing industry. Following his retirement from the Dáil, he remained a prominent local community activist until his death in 2001.

== Early life ==
Denis Gallagher was born on 29 December 1922 in Currane, on Clew Bay and facing Achill Island, County Mayo, within the civil parish of Achill though not on the island itself. He was the son of John Gallagher, a merchant who kept a shop in Currane, and his wife Catherine (née Gallagher), who was also from the area. He grew up speaking English and Irish, though his immediate family generally used English as his mother was monolingual.

His schooling at Currane national school was cut short when a visiting uncle, who taught at a Marist school in Dundalk, County Louth, was alarmed by the poor standard of education there and brought him to Dundalk in 1935 for enrolment at St Malachy's. From 1937 he attended the Irish-speaking preparatory school Coláiste Éinde in Salthill, Galway.

== Teaching career and Gaelic football ==
A Gaelic football enthusiast, generally selected at midfield owing to his height, Gallagher won a Mayo junior championship with his club, Achill, in 1942. He also played in Dublin for Erin's Hope and Clan na Gael, representing both on the county board, and refereed the 1945 Dublin senior football final, in which Charles Haughey and Jack Lynch played on opposing sides.

He qualified as a national school teacher, having trained at St Patrick's College in Drumcondra, Dublin, and taught from 1943 as a primary school teacher in Drimnagh, Dublin. In 1946 he returned to Achill on being appointed principal of the national school in Ashleam.

He married Hannah McHugh of Keel West, Achill, on 31 March 1948, and the couple went on to have twelve children. They lived in Keel West before moving to Cloughmore, Achill, in 1951, and then to Currane in 1960 after his appointment as principal of the local national school. He was active in the Irish National Teachers' Organisation, serving as chairman of its Mayo branch in the mid-1960s. After Achill GAA amalgamated with Mulranny, he captained Mulranny to the 1949 Mayo junior championship and continued to play and referee throughout the 1950s. He was also a skilled accordionist and enjoyed sailing his traditional Mayo yawl, serving as chairman of the Mayo Currach Racing Council during the decade.

== Republican activity ==
Gallagher's immersion in Gaelic culture and his membership of the Pioneer Total Abstinence Association complemented an uncompromising nationalism. Radicalised by high emigration from Achill and by the Fianna Fáil government's handling of the 1946 primary school teachers' strike, as well as its readiness to imprison and execute IRA members, he broke with his family's Fianna Fáil roots by joining the newly formed republican party Clann na Poblachta in 1948.

He stood unsuccessfully in local elections in 1950 and 1955, falling short by ten votes in 1950, and contested the 1954 general election as a Clann na Poblachta candidate for Mayo North, again without success. As Clann na Poblachta faded in the mid-1950s, he joined Sinn Féin, and was prosecuted and fined in 1960 for holding an unlicensed church-gate collection on the party's behalf. His home sheltered IRA fugitives during the 1956–62 border campaign.

== GAA administration and community activism ==
Gallagher advanced within the administrative structures of the Gaelic Athletic Association, serving as chairman of the West Mayo board (1956/7), chairman of the Mayo county board (1958-61), vice-chairman of the Connacht council (1961-4), chairman of the Connacht council (1964-7) and vice-president of the GAA (1964-7). In 1967 he unsuccessfully contested the presidency of the GAA.

With the IRA in abeyance by the early 1960s, Gallagher emerged as an Achill community activist, seeking to develop local tourism and fishing. In 1965 he became secretary of the Achill Fishermen's Association, later the Achill Fishermen's Co-operative, and founded the Federation of Irish Fishing Co-operatives (also referred to as the Federation of Sea Fishing Cooperatives). His lobbying secured fish storage facilities and grants for new boats for Achill's fishermen.

== National politics ==
=== As a TD ===
To advance his community work, Gallagher joined Fianna Fáil in 1967 and was elected to Mayo County Council for the Westport area, on which he served until 1977. From the late 1960s he served on a number of regional development boards, and was a member of Bord Iascaigh Mhara and the Inland Fisheries Commission, where he opposed efforts to curtail the use of drift nets at sea in defence of Mayo's part-time fishermen.

Having narrowly won the Fianna Fáil nomination for the Mayo West constituency, he contested the 1969 general election and, though unsuccessful, surpassed expectations by harnessing the previously divided Achill vote. He was elected to Dáil Éireann on his third attempt at the 1973 general election for the Mayo West constituency, unseating the sitting Fianna Fáil TDs Joe Leneghan and Micheál Ó Móráin and becoming Achill's first TD. The influential Western People local newspaper strongly backed his candidacy, with its columnist John Healy among his most vocal supporters.

Gallagher went on to hold his seat in five further general elections, consolidating his electoral base around Clew Bay, particularly in Westport, and northwards along the coastal fishing communities into Erris. In 1974, he was appointed Fianna Fáil spokesperson on Fisheries, a post to which the Irish Times noted he brought practical experience as the owner of a 28-foot fishing boat. From this position he led demands for the unilateral imposition of a fifty-mile Irish fishing zone excluding foreign trawlers. During this period he was also a member of Bord Iascaigh Mhara and the Western Regional Tourism Organisation, and chaired the Galway-Mayo Marine Resources Advisory Board.

=== First term as Minister for the Gaeltacht (1977–79) ===
Fianna Fáil won the 1977 Irish general election and Jack Lynch became Taoiseach, appointing Gallagher Minister for the Gaeltacht. As minister, Gallagher took a close interest in Irish language affairs, touring the Gaeltacht regions energetically and winning over sceptics with his command of the language. He was noted for providing lifts for constituents in his state car and for answering opposition TDs in Irish to deter prolonged questioning.

Disliking state policy that encouraged industrial development in the Gaeltacht on the grounds that it required an influx of English-speakers, Gallagher regarded co-operatives engaged in exploiting natural resources as more commercially realistic; from 1978 he curtailed state investment in unviable Gaeltacht industries, later acknowledging his own discomfort at having previously lobbied in cabinet for such funding. He also ensured that English-speaking offshore islands, previously disadvantaged, received the same level of state support as Irish-speaking Gaeltacht communities.

His main achievement as minister was the establishment in 1979 of a new Gaeltacht authority, Údarás na Gaeltachta, which combined cultural and linguistic functions with an economic one. Critics who favoured Gaeltacht self-government dismissed the authority as lacking adequate powers over planning, infrastructure, education and development, and his introduction of a majority-elected board, while initially hailed as a step forward, was seen as having politicised the new authority.

In the December 1979 leadership contest, Gallagher backed the finance minister, George Colley, who had assisted him in getting the Údarás na Gaeltachta legislation through cabinet. Charles Haughey won the contest and became Taoiseach, and Gallagher was among four ministers dropped from the new cabinet, with pointed comments he made in the immediate aftermath said to have sealed his fate. On the day of his demotion, he had to ask the new Taoiseach for the use of his ministerial car so that he could travel to Currane to vote in the first elections to Údarás na Gaeltachta, the body he had helped establish. His constituency rival, Pádraig Flynn, benefited from the reshuffle, a development that did not go down well in West Mayo.

=== Opposition years (1980–87) ===
Gallagher's supporters lobbied the party leadership on his behalf, and his presence on the platform during Haughey's tour of Mayo in September 1980 was met with sustained applause. Haughey bowed to the pressure, and in October 1980 appointed Gallagher Minister of State at the Department of Industry, Commerce and Tourism. He served in that role until Fianna Fáil lost office in June 1981.

Gallagher supported Haughey through the party's leadership struggles of 1981–83, serving as fisheries spokesman after Fianna Fáil lost power in 1981, and as junior minister for social welfare from early 1982. Fianna Fáil returned to government in March 1982, and in October 1982, following the resignations of Martin O'Donoghue and Desmond O'Malley from the cabinet, Gallagher was reappointed Minister for the Gaeltacht, though for stopgap purposes only, with a general election imminent. He remained in that post until Fianna Fáil went into opposition following its defeat in the November 1982 general election.

In opposition from 1983, Gallagher served as Fianna Fáil's Gaeltacht spokesman and headed a committee responsible for increasing the use of Irish in Oireachtas business. By this stage he was among the most popular deputies in the Dáil, though he was regarded by some as too unassuming and upright for his own political advancement.

=== Junior minister and retirement (1987–89) ===
Following the 1987 Irish general election, Fianna Fáil returned to government and Haughey claimed the Department of the Gaeltacht for himself alongside the office of Taoiseach, appointing Gallagher Minister of State at the Department of the Gaeltacht. Pádraig Flynn, by then firmly established in Haughey's favour, outpolled Gallagher for the first time in the 1987 election, closing off his path back to cabinet.

With his prospects diminished, Gallagher grew less inhibited about his republican past. He condemned the proposed renewal of the extradition treaty with Britain in November 1987, and in a December 1988 interview with the Irish-language magazine Comhar he acknowledged his earlier support for the IRA during the border campaign, including his conviction over the unlicensed Sinn Féin collection and his sheltering of IRA members. He also expressed frustration that political parties generally paid only lip service to the Irish language.

Family circumstances also weighed on his decision to retire: his wife suffered from depression, and with their children grown, the burden of her care fell increasingly to him. Following a heated confrontation in May 1989 with protesters opposed to the introduction of a fishing-rod licence, Gallagher surprised supporters by announcing that he would not contest the forthcoming election. He retired from politics at the 1989 Irish general election.

== Later life and community work ==
On his retirement, Gallagher was immediately appointed chairman of Údarás na Gaeltachta, a role in which he served conscientiously before resigning in 1991. After an unsuccessful bid in the 1991 local elections, he devoted himself to community work, becoming the mainstay of development associations for Currane and Achill. He founded the Achill Development Committee, which grew to encompass three sub-committees covering information technology, the Irish language and an energy survey.

Drawing on his political contacts and knowledge of state bureaucracy, Gallagher helped establish various social employment schemes and was instrumental in securing European Union development funding for the whole of Achill; the Achill Development Company was established in 1999 to administer these funds, with Gallagher as its chairman. Weeks before his death, one of his final successes was helping to secure £60,000 in government funding for the purchase of the Heinrich Böll cottage on Achill Island, ensuring its continued use as a centre for literature and the arts. He also campaigned for community facilities for the area's elderly returned emigrants.

== Death ==
Denis Gallagher remained active and in good health until a sudden illness shortly before his death. He died at Mayo General Hospital, Castlebar, on 3 November 2001, aged 78, following a brief illness.

His funeral, held in Achill, was among the largest witnessed in the parish, with the Taoiseach, Bertie Ahern, among those in attendance. Other mourners included the Minister of State at the Department of Health, Dr Tom Moffett; the Minister of State with responsibility for Arts, Heritage and the Islands, Mary Coughlan; two former European Commissioners, Pádraig Flynn and Ray MacSharry; former Connacht-Ulster MEP Mark Killilea Jnr; and former West Mayo TD and Senator Martin O'Toole. The Archbishop of Tuam, Dr Michael Neary, presided at the funeral Mass, with the main celebrant Father Patrick Gilligan, PP, Achill, assisted by one of Gallagher's brothers, Father Michael Gallagher. In his homily, Father Gilligan praised Gallagher for unifying the Gaeltacht and non-Gaeltacht parts of the parish into a single, cohesive voice for development. He was buried in Polranny cemetery, Achill; the main mourners were his widow, Hannah, and their children.

He was survived by his wife Hannah; 5 sons and 7 daughters. He was predeceased by his brother Patrick.

Political offices
Preceded by Tom O'Donnell	Minister for the Gaeltacht; 1977–1979	Succeeded by Máire Geoghegan-Quinn
Preceded by Ray Burke; Thomas Meaney	Minister of State at the Department of Industry, Commerce and Tourism; 1980–1981; With: Thomas Meaney	Succeeded by Michael Begley
New office	Minister of State at the Department of Social Welfare; Mar.–Oct. 1982	Succeeded by Rory O'Hanlon
Preceded by Pádraig Flynn	Minister for the Gaeltacht; Oct. 1982–Dec. 1982	Succeeded by Paddy O'Toole
Vacant Title last held by Michael D'Arcy	Minister of State at the Department of the Gaeltacht; 1987–1989	Succeeded by Pat "the Cope" Gallagher

Dáil	Election	Deputy (Party)	Deputy (Party)	Deputy (Party)
19th	1969	Mícheál Ó Móráin (FF)	Joseph Lenehan (FF)	Henry Kenny (FG)
20th	1973	Denis Gallagher (FF)	Myles Staunton (FG)	Henry Kenny (FG)
20th	1975 by-election	Denis Gallagher (FF)	Myles Staunton (FG)	Enda Kenny (FG)
21st	1977	Denis Gallagher (FF)	Pádraig Flynn (FF)	Enda Kenny (FG)
22nd	1981	Denis Gallagher (FF)	Pádraig Flynn (FF)	Enda Kenny (FG)
23rd	1982 (Feb)	Denis Gallagher (FF)	Pádraig Flynn (FF)	Enda Kenny (FG)
24th	1982 (Nov)	Denis Gallagher (FF)	Pádraig Flynn (FF)	Enda Kenny (FG)
25th	1987	Denis Gallagher (FF)	Pádraig Flynn (FF)	Enda Kenny (FG)
26th	1989	Martin O'Toole (FF)	Pádraig Flynn (FF)	Enda Kenny (FG)
27th	1992	Séamus Hughes (FF)	Pádraig Flynn (FF)	Enda Kenny (FG)
27th	1994 by-election	Séamus Hughes (FF)	Michael Ring (FG)	Enda Kenny (FG)
28th	1997	Constituency abolished. See Mayo		
