= Leitir N.S. =

- Leitir, Islandeady, Castlebar, County Mayo; Ireland

Information
- Other name: St. Joseph's N.S.
- Type: Primary school
- Religious affiliation: Catholicism
- Opened: 1889
- Status: Closed
- Closed: 2019
- Website: www.castlebar.ie/education/leitirns/index.htm

Leitir N.S. (also known as St. Joseph's N.S.) was an Irish Roman Catholic primary school located in Leitir, Islandeady, Castlebar, County Mayo, Ireland.

The original school opened in 1889 and the new school opened in 1962. The school closed permanently on 28 June 2019.

== Notable alumni ==
- Enda Kenny, former Taoiseach of Ireland (2011–2017), and Leader of Fine Gael (2002–2017)
- Henry Kenny, Fine Gael politician and Gaelic footballer (teacher)
- Ray Moylette, professional boxer

== See also ==
- Education in the Republic of Ireland
