= 1975 Mayo West by-election =

By-election to the 20th Dáil

- 12 November 1975
- Turnout: 29,513 (77.2%)
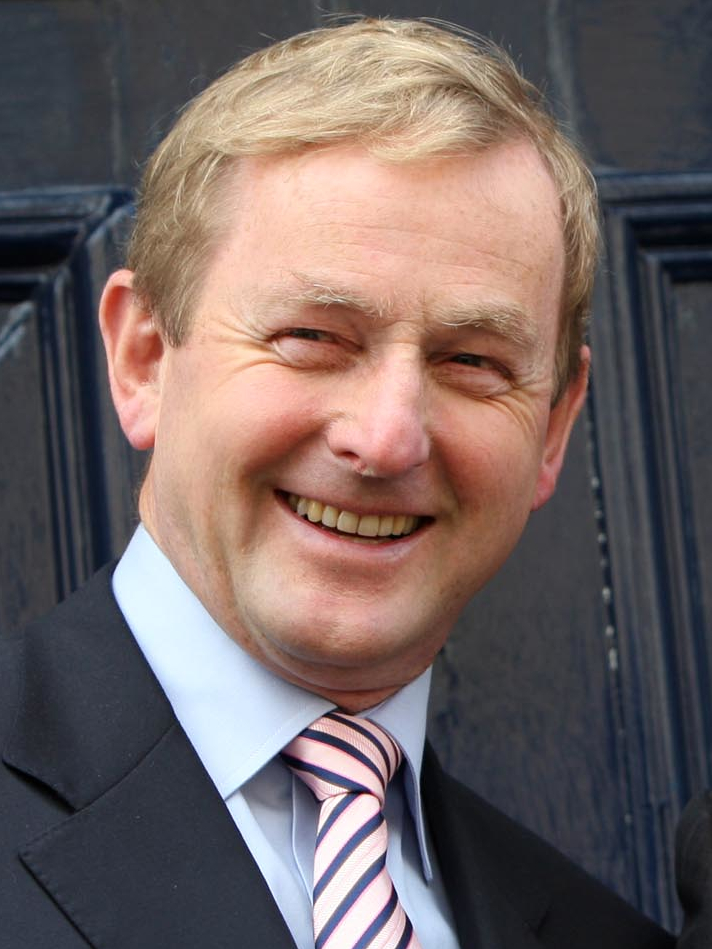
		McGreal	Morahan
Nominee	Enda Kenny	Michael Joe McGreal	Basil Morahan
Party	Fine Gael	Fianna Fáil	Independent
First preferences	15,584	12,448	1,481
Percentage	52.8%	42.2%	5.0%
TD before election
Henry Kenny
Fine Gael
TD after election
Enda Kenny
Fine Gael

A Dáil by-election was held in the constituency of Mayo West in Ireland on Wednesday, 12 November 1975, to fill a vacancy in the 20th Dáil. It followed the death of Fine Gael Teachta Dála (TD) Henry Kenny on 25 September 1975.

A government motion to issue the writ of election to fill the vacancy was agreed by the Dáil on 23 October 1975.

The by-election was won by the Fine Gael candidate Enda Kenny, son of the deceased TD, Henry Kenny.

== Result ==
1975 Mayo West by-election
Party	Candidate	FPv%	Count
Party	Candidate	FPv%	1
Fine Gael	Enda Kenny	52.8	15,584
Fianna Fáil	Michael Joe McGreal	42.2	12,448
Independent	Basil Morahan	5.0	1,481
Electorate: 38,249 Valid: 29,513 Quota: 14,757 Turnout: 77.2%
