= Mayo West (Dáil constituency) =

Dáil constituency (1969–1997)

- Former Dáil constituency

Former constituency
- Created: 1969
- Abolished: 1997
- Seats: 3
- Local government area: County Mayo
- Created from: Mayo North; Mayo South
- Replaced by: Mayo

Mayo West was a parliamentary constituency represented in Dáil Éireann, the lower house of the Irish parliament or Oireachtas from 1969 to 1997. The constituency was served by 3 deputies (Teachtaí Dála, commonly known as TDs). The method of election was proportional representation by means of the single transferable vote (PR-STV).

== History and boundaries ==
The constituency was created under the terms of the Electoral (Amendment) Act 1969, taking in parts of the former Mayo North and Mayo South constituencies, and included Ballinrobe, Belmullet, Castlebar and Westport. With effect from the 1997 general election it was combined with Mayo East to form a new five-seat Mayo constituency.

== TDs ==
Teachtaí Dála (TDs) for Mayo West 1969–1997
Key to parties: FF = Fianna Fáil; FG = Fine Gael
Dáil	Election	Deputy (Party)	Deputy (Party)	Deputy (Party)
19th	1969	Mícheál Ó Móráin (FF)	Joseph Lenehan (FF)	Henry Kenny (FG)
20th	1973	Denis Gallagher (FF)	Myles Staunton (FG)	Henry Kenny (FG)
20th	1975 by-election	Denis Gallagher (FF)	Myles Staunton (FG)	Enda Kenny (FG)
21st	1977	Denis Gallagher (FF)	Pádraig Flynn (FF)	Enda Kenny (FG)
22nd	1981	Denis Gallagher (FF)	Pádraig Flynn (FF)	Enda Kenny (FG)
23rd	1982 (Feb)	Denis Gallagher (FF)	Pádraig Flynn (FF)	Enda Kenny (FG)
24th	1982 (Nov)	Denis Gallagher (FF)	Pádraig Flynn (FF)	Enda Kenny (FG)
25th	1987	Denis Gallagher (FF)	Pádraig Flynn (FF)	Enda Kenny (FG)
26th	1989	Martin O'Toole (FF)	Pádraig Flynn (FF)	Enda Kenny (FG)
27th	1992	Séamus Hughes (FF)	Pádraig Flynn (FF)	Enda Kenny (FG)
27th	1994 by-election	Séamus Hughes (FF)	Michael Ring (FG)	Enda Kenny (FG)
28th	1997	Constituency abolished. See Mayo		

Note: The columns in this table are used only for presentational purposes, and no significance should be attached to the order of columns. For details of the order in which seats were won at each election, see the detailed results of that election.

== Elections ==
*: Outgoing TD

=== 1994 by-election ===
Following the resignation of Fianna Fáil TD Pádraig Flynn on his appointment as EU Commissioner, a by-election was held on 9 June 1994. The seat was won by the Fine Gael candidate Michael Ring.

1994 by-election: Mayo West
Party	Candidate	FPv%	Count	
Party	Candidate	FPv%	1	2
Fianna Fáil	Beverley Cooper Flynn	37.7	10,967	13,639
Fine Gael	Michael Ring	35.7	10,390	14,063
Independent	Paddy McGuinness	21.6	6,275	
Labour	Johnny Mee	3.8	1,103	
Independent	Jerry Cowley	1.3	388	
Electorate: 45,932 Valid: 29,123 Quota: 14,562 Turnout: 63.4%

=== 1992 general election ===
1992 general election: Mayo West
Party	Candidate	FPv%	Count			
Party	Candidate	FPv%	1	2	3	4
Fianna Fáil	Pádraig Flynn	32.5	9,629			
Fine Gael	Enda Kenny	20.9	6,210	6,664	6,727	7,656
Fine Gael	Michael Ring	17.3	5,136	5,232	5,253	5,899
Fianna Fáil	Séamus Hughes	14.8	4,401	5,519	6,267	7,319
Independent	Paraic Cosgrove	11.7	3,478	3,687	3,943	
Fianna Fáil	Michael Goonan	2.7	803	1,140		
Electorate: 43,472 Valid: 29,657 Spoilt: 389 (1.3%) Quota: 7,415 Turnout: 30,046 (69.1%)

=== 1989 general election ===
1989 general election: Mayo West
Party	Candidate	FPv%	Count		
Party	Candidate	FPv%	1	2	3
Fianna Fáil	Pádraig Flynn	20.4	5,974	6,052	7,670
Fine Gael	Enda Kenny	18.4	5,385	7,540	
Fianna Fáil	Martin O'Toole	18.4	5,379	6,060	7,413
Independent	Frank Durcan	17.7	5,187	5,691	6,227
Fianna Fáil	Paraic Cosgrove	13.0	3,804	3,908	
Fine Gael	Myles Staunton	12.2	3,572		
Electorate: 39,505 Valid: 29,301 Quota: 7,326 Turnout: 74.2%

=== 1987 general election ===
1987 general election: Mayo West
Party	Candidate	FPv%	Count	
Party	Candidate	FPv%	1	2
Fine Gael	Enda Kenny	24.5	7,410	7,574
Fianna Fáil	Pádraig Flynn	23.8	7,198	8,250
Fianna Fáil	Denis Gallagher	22.8	6,908	8,461
Fine Gael	Patrick Durcan	18.8	5,683	5,955
Fianna Fáil	Paraic Cosgrove	10.2	3,091	
Electorate: 40,739 Valid: 30,290 Quota: 7,573 Turnout: 74.4%

=== November 1982 general election ===
November 1982 general election: Mayo West
Party	Candidate	FPv%	Count		
Party	Candidate	FPv%	1	2	3
Fine Gael	Enda Kenny	24.4	7,463	8,136	
Fianna Fáil	Denis Gallagher	23.7	7,251	8,676	
Fianna Fáil	Pádraig Flynn	20.7	6,348	7,549	8,501
Fine Gael	Patrick Durcan	18.5	5,669	6,178	6,240
Fianna Fáil	Paraic Cosgrove	8.6	2,619		
Labour	Johnny Mee	4.2	1,296		
Electorate: 41,404 Valid: 30,646 Quota: 7,662 Turnout: 74.0%

=== February 1982 general election ===
February 1982 general election: Mayo West
Party	Candidate	FPv%	Count			
Party	Candidate	FPv%	1	2	3	4
Fine Gael	Enda Kenny	25.8	7,908			
Fianna Fáil	Denis Gallagher	24.2	7,413	7,520	7,567	9,093
Fianna Fáil	Pádraig Flynn	21.6	6,611	6,677	6,719	7,682
Fine Gael	Patrick Durcan	12.2	3,739	4,071	5,397	5,573
Fianna Fáil	Paraic Cosgrove	8.4	2,563	2,582	2,916	
Fine Gael	John Carey	5.8	1,769	1,829		
Labour	John Gibbons	2.0	620			
Electorate: 41,514 Valid: 30,623 Quota: 7,656 Turnout: 73.8%

=== 1981 general election ===
1981 general election: Mayo West
Party	Candidate	FPv%	Count		
Party	Candidate	FPv%	1	2	3
Fine Gael	Enda Kenny	26.3	8,458		
Fianna Fáil	Denis Gallagher	24.1	7,741	8,101	
Fianna Fáil	Pádraig Flynn	20.6	6,605	6,642	9,028
Fine Gael	Patrick Durcan	13.4	4,312	5,755	5,976
Fianna Fáil	Timothy Quinn	9.4	3,010	3,080	
Fine Gael	Patrick Kilbane	6.2	1,982		
Electorate: 41,514 Valid: 32,108 Quota: 8,028 Turnout: 77.3%

=== 1977 general election ===
1977 general election: Mayo West
Party	Candidate	FPv%	Count			
Party	Candidate	FPv%	1	2	3	4
Fine Gael	Enda Kenny	28.7	9,457			
Fianna Fáil	Denis Gallagher	24.1	7,958	8,004	8,345	
Fianna Fáil	Pádraig Flynn	16.5	5,439	5,502	5,671	8,686
Fine Gael	Myles Staunton	15.8	5,203	6,237	6,758	7,026
Fianna Fáil	Timothy Quinn	11.2	3,704	3,736	3,834	
Independent	Basil Morahan	3.2	1,055	1,085		
Independent	Peter Keane	0.6	181	183		
Electorate: 42,424 Valid: 32,997 Quota: 8,250 Turnout: 77.8%

=== 1975 by-election ===
Following the death of Fine Gael TD Henry Kenny, a by-election was held on 12 November 1975. The seat was won by the Fine Gael candidate Enda Kenny, son of the deceased TD.

1975 by-election: Mayo West
Party	Candidate	FPv%	Count
Party	Candidate	FPv%	1
Fine Gael	Enda Kenny	52.8	15,584
Fianna Fáil	Michael Joe McGreal	42.2	12,448
Independent	Basil Morahan	5.0	1,481
Electorate: 38,249 Valid: 29,513 Quota: 14,757 Turnout: 77.2%

=== 1973 general election ===
1973 general election: Mayo West
Party	Candidate	FPv%	Count	
Party	Candidate	FPv%	1	2
Fine Gael	Myles Staunton	25.4	6,381	
Fine Gael	Henry Kenny	24.0	6,024	6,268
Fianna Fáil	Mícheál Ó Móráin	19.8	4,971	5,618
Fianna Fáil	Denis Gallagher	17.0	4,255	6,474
Fianna Fáil	Joseph Lenehan	13.8	3,475	
Electorate: 39,040 Valid: 25,106 Quota: 6,277 Turnout: 64.3%

=== 1969 general election ===
1969 general election: Mayo West
Party	Candidate	FPv%	Count				
Party	Candidate	FPv%	1	2	3	4	5
Fine Gael	Henry Kenny	24.7	6,246	6,368			
Fianna Fáil	Mícheál Ó Móráin	23.5	5,943	5,979	5,985	6,015	7,064
Fine Gael	Myles Staunton	15.4	3,891	4,032	4,067	4,834	5,253
Fianna Fáil	Joseph Lenehan	15.1	3,817	3,845	3,847	4,204	6,235
Fianna Fáil	Denis Gallagher	14.2	3,591	3,637	3,639	3,725	
Fine Gael	Eamonn Carey	5.2	1,314	1,335	1,346		
Labour	Michael Reilly	1.8	445				
Electorate: 34,658 Valid: 25,247 Quota: 6,312 Turnout: 72.8%

== See also ==
- Dáil constituencies
- Politics of the Republic of Ireland
- Historic Dáil constituencies
- Elections in the Republic of Ireland
