= Martin O'Toole =

Irish politician (1925–2013)

Teachta Dála
- In office June 1989 – November 1992
- Constituency: Mayo West

Senator
- In office 27 October 1977 – 15 June 1989
- Constituency: Agricultural Panel

Personal details
- Born: 27 May 1925 Louisburgh, County Mayo, Ireland
- Died: 1 October 2013 (aged 88) County Mayo, Ireland
- Party: Fianna Fáil

Martin Joseph O'Toole (27 May 1925 – 1 October 2013) was an Irish Fianna Fáil politician. He was a Senator from 1977 to 1989, then a Teachta Dála (TD) from 1989 to 1992.

Born in Louisburgh, County Mayo, O'Toole was a farmer, livestock exporter and haulage contractor before entering politics. He was a member of Mayo County Council and served as chairman on a number of occasions. He was elected in 1977 to the 14th Seanad on the Agricultural Panel. O'Toole was returned to the Seanad four times until the 1989 general election when he was elected to Dáil Éireann as a TD for Mayo West. He stood down at the 1992 general election after serving only one term in the Dáil.

Dáil	Election	Deputy (Party)	Deputy (Party)	Deputy (Party)
19th	1969	Mícheál Ó Móráin (FF)	Joseph Lenehan (FF)	Henry Kenny (FG)
20th	1973	Denis Gallagher (FF)	Myles Staunton (FG)	Henry Kenny (FG)
20th	1975 by-election	Denis Gallagher (FF)	Myles Staunton (FG)	Enda Kenny (FG)
21st	1977	Denis Gallagher (FF)	Pádraig Flynn (FF)	Enda Kenny (FG)
22nd	1981	Denis Gallagher (FF)	Pádraig Flynn (FF)	Enda Kenny (FG)
23rd	1982 (Feb)	Denis Gallagher (FF)	Pádraig Flynn (FF)	Enda Kenny (FG)
24th	1982 (Nov)	Denis Gallagher (FF)	Pádraig Flynn (FF)	Enda Kenny (FG)
25th	1987	Denis Gallagher (FF)	Pádraig Flynn (FF)	Enda Kenny (FG)
26th	1989	Martin O'Toole (FF)	Pádraig Flynn (FF)	Enda Kenny (FG)
27th	1992	Séamus Hughes (FF)	Pádraig Flynn (FF)	Enda Kenny (FG)
27th	1994 by-election	Séamus Hughes (FF)	Michael Ring (FG)	Enda Kenny (FG)
28th	1997	Constituency abolished. See Mayo		
