= Enda Kenny =

Taoiseach from 2011 to 2017

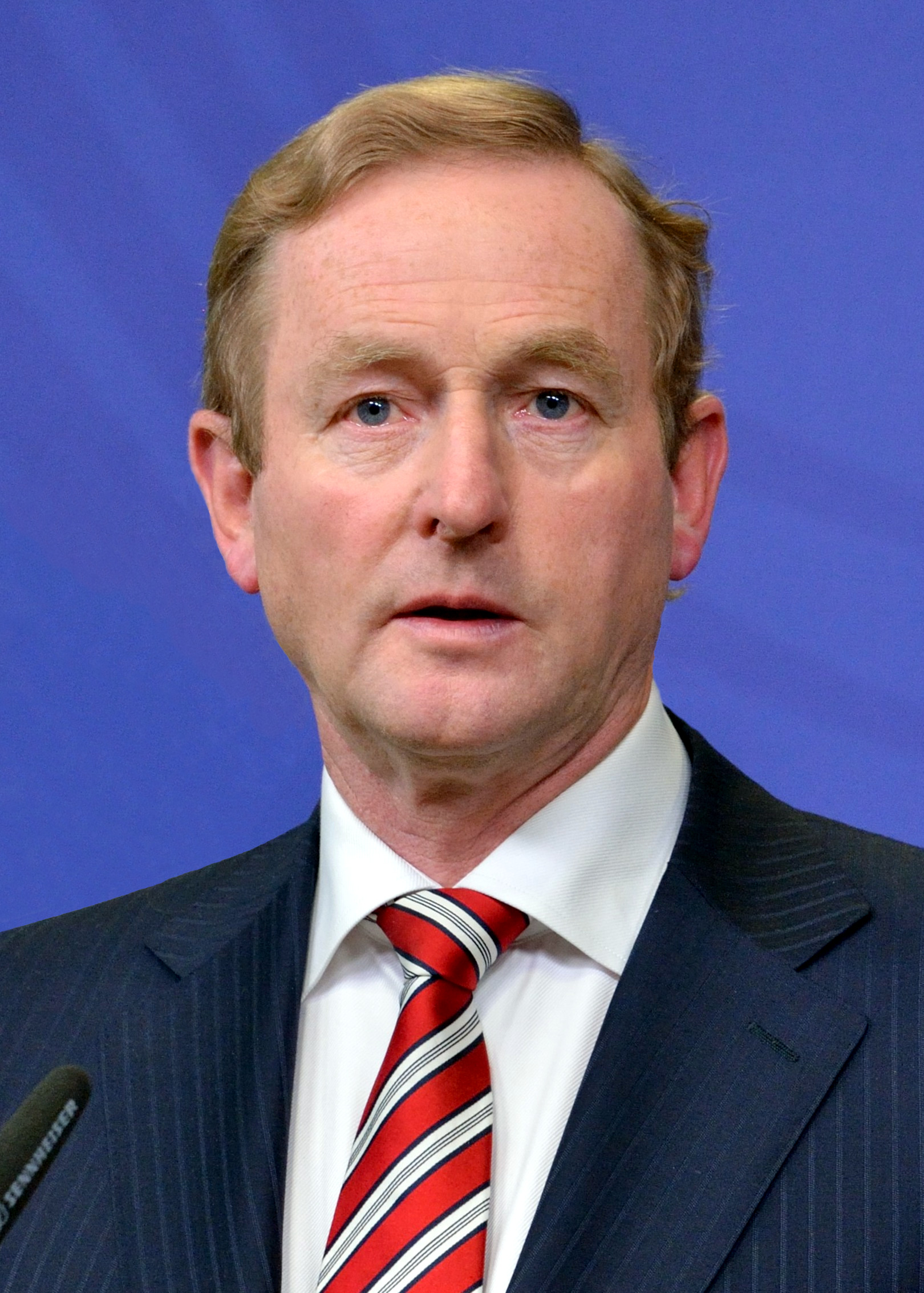
- Kenny in 2012

Taoiseach
- In office 9 March 2011 – 14 June 2017
- President: Mary McAleese; Michael D. Higgins
- Tánaiste: Eamon Gilmore; Joan Burton; Frances Fitzgerald
- Preceded by: Brian Cowen
- Succeeded by: Leo Varadkar
Ministerial offices
Minister for Defence
In office 6 May 2016 – 14 June 2017
Taoiseach	Himself
Preceded by	Simon Coveney
Succeeded by	Leo Varadkar
Acting; 7 May 2014 – 11 July 2014
Taoiseach	Himself
Preceded by	Alan Shatter
Succeeded by	Simon Coveney
Minister for Tourism and Trade
In office 15 December 1994 – 26 June 1997
Taoiseach	John Bruton
Preceded by	Charlie McCreevy
Succeeded by	Jim McDaid
Minister of State
1986–1987	Education
1986–1987	Labour

Leader of Fine Gael
- In office 5 June 2002 – 2 June 2017
- Deputy: Richard Bruton; James Reilly
- Preceded by: Michael Noonan
- Succeeded by: Leo Varadkar

Leader of the Opposition
- In office 5 June 2002 – 9 March 2011
- Taoiseach: Bertie Ahern; Brian Cowen
- Preceded by: Michael Noonan
- Succeeded by: Micheál Martin

Teachta Dála
- In office June 1997 – February 2020
- Constituency: Mayo
- In office November 1975 – June 1997
- Constituency: Mayo West

Personal details
- Born: 24 April 1951 (age 75) Castlebar, County Mayo, Ireland
- Party: Fine Gael
- Spouse: Fionnuala O'Kelly (m. 1992)
- Children: 3
- Parent: Henry Kenny (father)
- Education: St Patrick's College, Dublin; University College Galway

Enda Kenny (born 24 April 1951) is an Irish former Fine Gael politician who served as Taoiseach from 2011 to 2017, Leader of Fine Gael from 2002 to 2017, Minister for Defence from May to July 2014 and 2016 to 2017, Leader of the Opposition from 2002 to 2011, Minister for Tourism and Trade from 1994 to 1997 and Minister of State at the Department of Labour and Department of Education with responsibility for Youth Affairs from 1986 to 1987. He served as Teachta Dála (TD) for Mayo West from 1975 to 1997 and for Mayo from 1997 to 2020.

Kenny led Fine Gael to a historic victory at the 2011 general election, his party becoming the largest in the country for the first time, forming a coalition government with the Labour Party on 9 March 2011. He subsequently became the first Fine Gael member to be elected Taoiseach for a second consecutive term on 6 May 2016, after two months of negotiations, following the 2016 election, forming a Fine Gael-led minority government. He was the first Taoiseach from Fine Gael since John Bruton (1994–1997), and the first Leader of Fine Gael to win a general election since Garret FitzGerald in 1982. He became the longest-serving Fine Gael Taoiseach in April 2017.

Kenny stepped down as Leader of Fine Gael on 2 June 2017, and announced he would resign as Taoiseach once a new leader was chosen in early June. In the following leadership election, the Minister for Social Protection, Leo Varadkar, was elected to succeed him as Leader of Fine Gael. Kenny tendered his resignation as Taoiseach on 13 June 2017, and was succeeded by Varadkar the following day. On 5 November 2017, Kenny announced that he would not contest the following general election.

== Early life ==
Kenny was born in 1951 in Derrycoosh, Islandeady, near Castlebar, County Mayo, the third child of five of Mary Eithne (McGinley) and Henry Kenny. He was educated locally at St Patrick's National School, Cornanool N.S, Leitir N.S and at St. Gerald's College, Castlebar. He was quite gifted and very good at school, doing well in his Leaving Certificate.

His family did not have enough money to send him to university, so he trained to become a primary school teacher. He attended St Patrick's College, Dublin. He excelled in St Pat's and won a Gold Medal for Educational Psychology.

He went on to qualify as a national teacher and was an undergraduate student at University College Galway. He worked as a primary school teacher for four years. He also played football for his local club Islandeady GAA.

== Career ==
=== Early years in Dáil Éireann (1975–1994) ===
Kenny was exposed to politics from an early age, following his father Henry Kenny becoming a Fine Gael TD in 1954. In the early 1970s, he became directly involved in politics when he started helping his father with constituency clinics. In 1975, Henry Kenny (who was at this stage a Parliamentary Secretary in the government) died after a short battle with cancer. Fine Gael wanted one of his sons to stand as their candidate at the subsequent by-election, and so Enda Kenny was chosen. He was elected on the first count with 52% of the vote, and thus became the youngest member of the 20th Dáil, aged 24.

Kenny remained on the backbenches for almost a decade and was said to be "very good and assiduous at local constituency matters". He was appointed party spokesperson firstly on Youth Affairs and Sport, then Western Development; however, he failed to build a national profile as he concentrated more on constituency matters. Kenny was left out in the cold when Garret FitzGerald became Taoiseach for the first time in 1981, and again in 1982. He was, however, appointed as a member of the Fine Gael delegation at the New Ireland Forum in 1983. He later served on the British-Irish Parliamentary Association. In 1986, he became a Minister of State at the Department of Labour and Department of Education with responsibility for Youth Affairs. Fine Gael lost the 1987 general election, resulting in Kenny and Fine Gael being on the opposition benches for the next seven years. In spite of this, his national profile was raised as he served in a number of positions on the party's front bench, including Education, Arts, Heritage, Gaeltacht, and the Islands. He was also the Fine Gael Chief Whip for a short period.

=== Minister for Tourism (1994–1997) ===
In late 1994, the Fianna Fáil–Labour Party government collapsed; however, no general election was called. Instead, a Fine Gael–Labour Party–Democratic Left "Rainbow Coalition" came to power. Kenny, as Fine Gael chief whip, was a key member of the team, which negotiated the programme for government with the other parties prior to the formation of the new government. Under Taoiseach John Bruton, Kenny joined the cabinet and was appointed Minister for Tourism and Trade. During his tenure as minister, Ireland saw significant growth in the tourism sector and in its international trade position. As minister, he chaired the European Union Council of Trade Ministers, during Ireland's six-month Presidency of the European Council, as well as co-chairing a round of the World Trade Organization talks in 1996. Among Kenny's other achievements were the rejuvenation of the Saint Patrick's Day parade in Dublin,, the successful negotiations to bring a stage of the 1998 Tour de France to Ireland and initiating the process to bring the Ryder Cup to Ireland for the first time in 2006. In 1997, the government was defeated at the general election and Kenny returned to the opposition benches.

=== Opposition (1997–2002) ===
==== Fine Gael leadership elections ====
===== 2001 =====
John Bruton resigned as leader of Fine Gael in 2001, following a vote of no confidence in his ability. Kenny stood in the subsequent leadership election, promising to "electrify the party". In the final ballot it was Michael Noonan who emerged victorious (it is Fine Gael's custom not to publish ballot results for leadership elections). Noonan did not give a spokesperson's assignment to Kenny; this led him to accuse Noonan of sending a "dangerous message".

===== 2002 =====
At the 2002 general election, Fine Gael suffered its worst electoral performance ever, losing 23 seats, a figure larger than expected, with its share of the vote down 5%. Kenny himself came close to losing his seat, and even went so far as to prepare a concession speech. In the end he won the third seat in the five-seat constituency. Noonan resigned as Fine Gael leader on the night of the result, an action which triggered another leadership election. Protest meetings were held by members of the party against the speed with which the leadership election had been called and the failure to broaden the franchise to the membership.

Kenny once again contested the leadership and emerged successful on that occasion.

=== Leader of the Opposition (2002–2011) ===
In September 2002, Kenny was accused of making racist remarks after he used the word "nigger" in a joke relating to Patrice Lumumba, the assassinated first Prime Minister of the Democratic Republic of the Congo. Kenny wanted the incident to be suppressed and specifically asked journalists not to cite it, though the Sunday Independent newspaper reported his "chortling repetition of the inflammatory word". He was subsequently condemned by race campaigners at home and abroad. Matters were made worse when it emerged that several of Lumumba's relatives, including a son and several grandchildren, lived in Tallaght.

Kenny apologised unreservedly but insisted that there was no racist intent, and that he was merely quoting what a Moroccan barman had once said, while reminiscing about an incident he had witnessed in the company of his friend David Molony, whose sudden death had recently occurred. However, what he said was widely seen as politically indefensible, as a story that should not have been told in the company of reporters by someone hoping to become the next Taoiseach.

Fine Gael out-performed expectations at the 2004 Local and European elections, which saw Fine Gael increase its representation from 4 MEPs of 15 from Ireland, to 5 from 13. This was the first time Fine Gael had ever defeated Fianna Fáil in a national election, as well as the first time Fianna Fáil had failed to finish first in a national election since its second place in the 1927 general election behind Cumann na nGaedheal, Fine Gael's immediate predecessor.

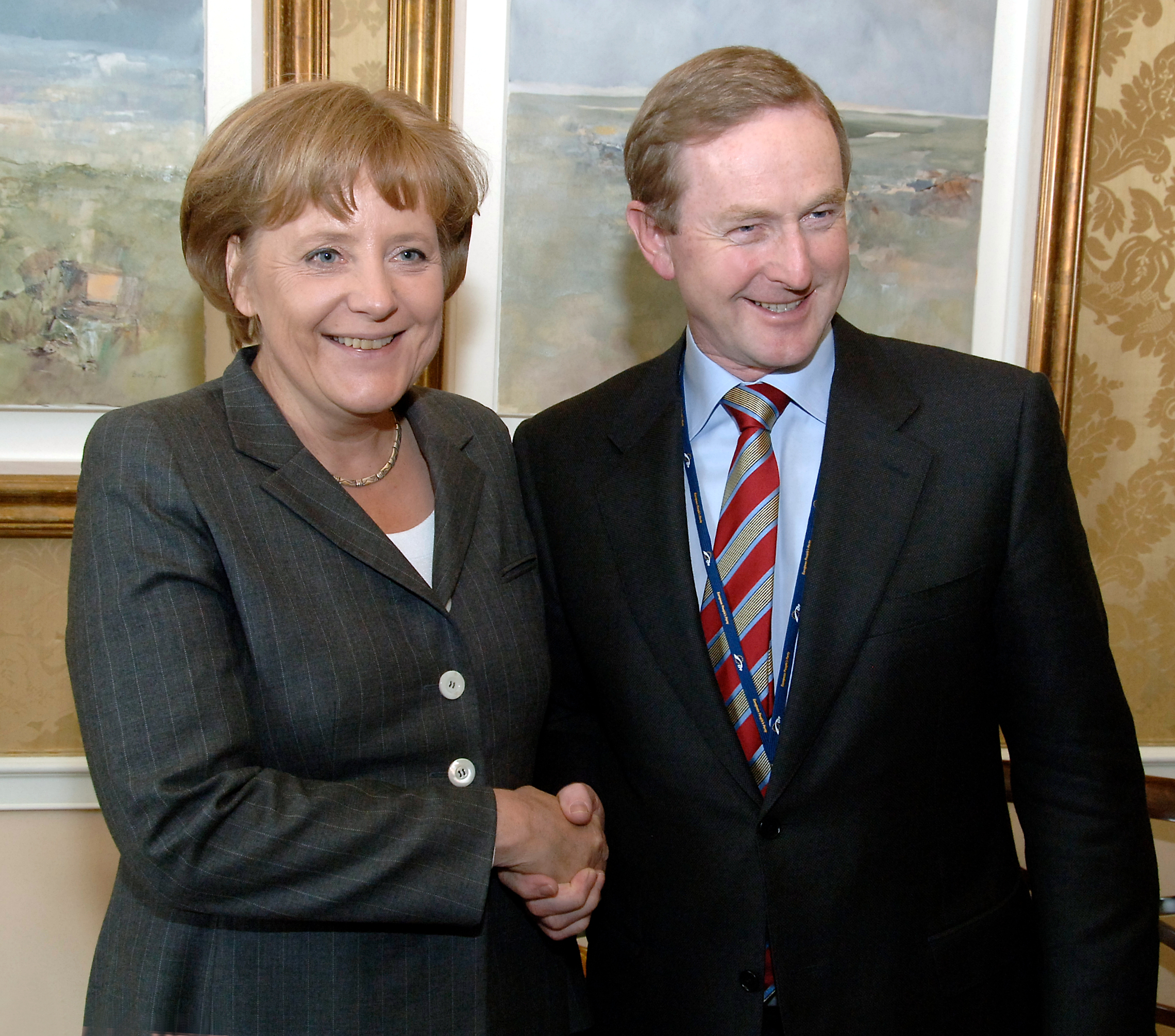
Kenny shakes the hand of German chancellor Angela Merkel in April 2008

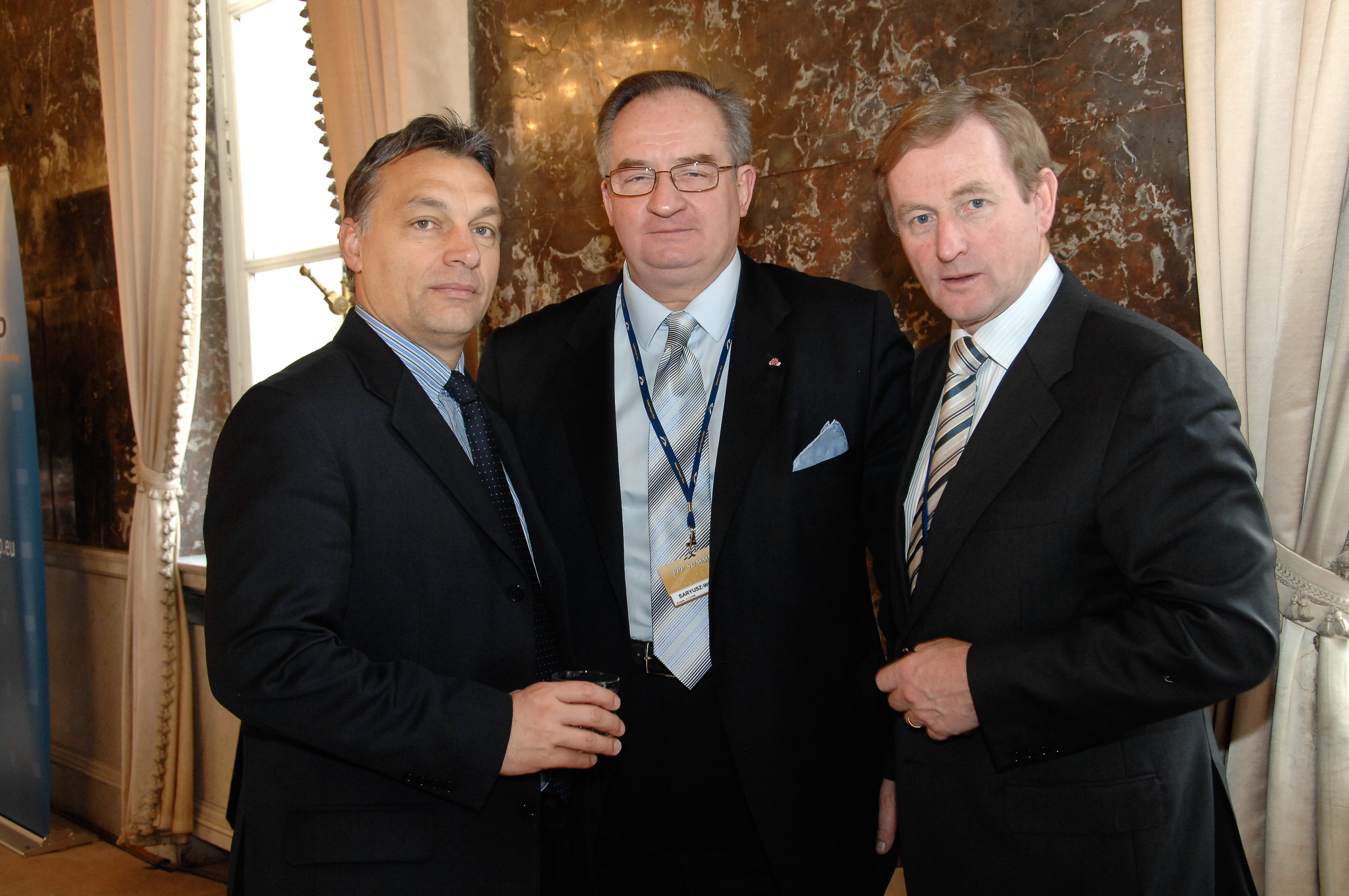
Fidesz president Viktor Orbán, Jacek Saryusz-Wolski MEP, and Kenny during an EPP summit in December 2008

In July 2005, five men from the north of Kenny's Mayo constituency were jailed over their opposition to the Fianna Fáil-led government's plans for the Corrib gas project. One of the men, Philip McGrath, worked for Kenny as an election agent for Rossport during general elections. Unlike his fellow Mayo Fine Gael TD, Michael Ring, Kenny was cautious about backing the men's stance (Ring would later be forced to adopt the same policy). The Shell to Sea campaign that was founded to help release the men and get the government to change its mind shut down work on the project for fifteen months. When Gardaí were brought in to remove protesters with tactics that saw many hospitalised, Kenny said: "The law must be obeyed."

In November 2005, Kenny called for the abolition of compulsory Irish for the Leaving Certificate examinations. This was opposed by all the major Irish language organisations. In March 2006, he was elected vice-president of the European People's Party (EPP), the largest European political group to which Fine Gael is affiliated. In his speech to the EPP, he stated that Fine Gael would be in government in Ireland within two years.

During the first half of 2006, Kenny went aggressively after a more populist line on the cost of immigration, street crime, paedophilia and homeowners' rights. A graphic description of a mugging he had experienced was given to the Dáil, in the context of a crime discussion, only for it to be revealed a day later that the incident had occurred in Kenya, not in Ireland.

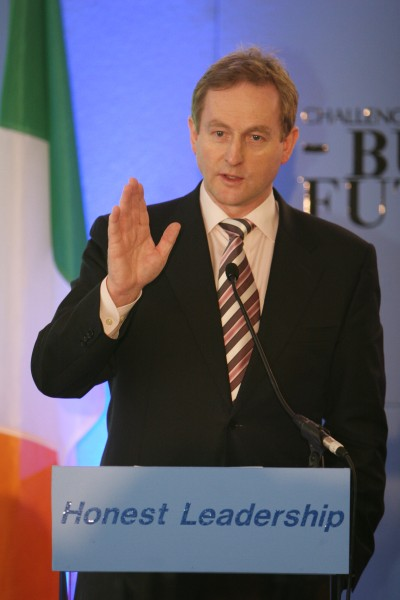
Kenny, speaking at the Young Fine Gael conference in 2007

Under Kenny, Fine Gael agreed to enter a pre-election pact with the Labour Party, to offer the electorate an alternative coalition government at the 2007 general election held on 24 May 2007. The so-called Mullingar Accord was agreed in September 2004, following the European and local elections that year. The Green Party also signalled via the media to be in favour of membership of such a coalition government after the election. However, it would not commit to an agreement before polling day.

Kenny's leadership defined Fine Gael as a party of the progressive centre. Its policy initiatives concentrated on value for money, consumer rights, civil partnerships, reform of public spending, reward and enterprise and preventative health care policy. The party sought to retake its former mantle as the law-and-order and a party committed to defending the institutions of the state. At the Fine Gael Ardfheis in March 2007, Kenny outlined his platform for the forthcoming general election entitled the "Contract for a Better Ireland". The main aspects of this "contract" included: 2,300 more hospital beds, 2,000 more Gardaí, tougher jail sentences and tougher bail for criminals, free health insurance for all children under 16 and lower income tax. Bertie Ahern was perceived by many to have comfortably beaten Kenny in the pre-election Leaders' debate. When the votes were counted it emerged that Fine Gael had made large gains, increasing its number of seats by twenty, to give a total of 51 seats in the new Dáil. However, Labour and the Greens failed to make gains, leaving Kenny's "Alliance for Change" short of a majority. Despite predictions to the contrary, the Fianna Fáil vote recovered sufficiently to bring it to 78 seats, and a third term in government for Ahern.

Responding to the banking crisis in County Cork, on 15 February 2009, Kenny asked the entire board of the Central Bank of Ireland's Financial Regulation section to resign.

==== Vice-president of the EPP ====
In March 2006, Enda Kenny was elected as the vice-president of the European People's Party at the EPP Congress in Rome. Commenting on his election Kenny said, "I am delighted that our sister parties have voted to maintain the central role Fine Gael has at the heart of a vastly enlarged European People's Party. My election to this post will ensure that we will continue to have real influence in the decision-making corridors of the largest European political family".

His EPP relations would go on to play an invaluable role during his time in government and the Irish financial crisis. He left the role after 7 years in 2012.

==== 2010 leadership challenge ====
An opinion poll published in The Irish Times on 10 June 2010 triggered a challenge to Kenny's leadership of the party. The Ipsos MRBI poll indicated that the Labour Party had become the most popular political party in the country for the first time, and also showed a drop in backing for Fianna Fáil and Fine Gael, and for their leaders. It showed a five-point drop in Fianna Fáil support since January 2010, leaving that party at 17%, Fine Gael down four points to 28%, and Labour up eight points to 32%. Satisfaction with Kenny's leadership dropped 7% to 24%.

Following the failure of the party's deputy leader Richard Bruton to support him, he was dismissed by Kenny on 14 June 2010. He also tabled a motion of confidence in his leadership, to be held on 17 June 2010. On the following day it was revealed that nine members of the Fine Gael frontbench did not have confidence in Kenny to lead their party – composed of Simon Coveney, Denis Naughten, Olwyn Enright, Olivia Mitchell, Fergus O'Dowd, Michael Creed, Billy Timmins, Leo Varadkar and Brian Hayes. Denis Naughten said frontbench members did not have Kenny's support and would like him to withdraw his motion of confidence and stand down in the interest of the party.

In December 2008, Vincent Browne criticised Kenny in The Irish Times for not having a grasp of the issues, notably of economic issues.

The motion of confidence in Kenny was passed. While no official tally was given, it is understood that Kenny had a "handsome enough" majority. He announced a major reshuffle of his party's front bench on 1 July 2010, re-appointing Bruton, Coveney, O'Dowd, and Varadkar.

=== 2011 general election ===
At the start of the 2011 general election campaign, Kenny said Fine Gael recognised the importance of "the giving of hope and confidence to people through the taxation system", when speaking to reporters outside party election headquarters in Dublin. "The Fine Gael party in this election is the only party that is categorically saying that there will not be any increase in income tax over our period in government", he said. He said the country needed a strong government and not an administration that depended on the support of Independents. "I think that this is a time for courageous and strong government. It is not a time for a government that might self-combust or that would be dependent on the whim of any mercenary Independents. This is a judgment call for the people."

There were several leaders' debates on television during the campaign. There were, uniquely, three debates on stations TV3, RTÉ and TG4, between Enda Kenny, Michaél Martin and Eamon Gilmore, and a five-way leaders' debate on RTÉ which also included Gerry Adams and John Gormley, along with the other participants from the three-way debates.

Kenny, however, refused to participate in the three-way leaders' debate proposed by TV3, stating his unhappiness that Vincent Browne was to chair the debate. Browne is a well-known critic of Fine Gael and Kenny. In 1982, Browne appeared on The Late Late Show where he poured scorn on Kenny, claiming he was "purporting" to be a TD. In October 2010, Browne was forced to make a public apology to Kenny after jokingly asking whether Fine Gael was requesting that he go into a darkroom with a gun and a bottle of whisky. This was in reference to Fine Gael's position in the polls, where they were in second place to Labour, and a previous leadership challenge to Kenny by Richard Bruton. Kenny refused to appear on the leaders debate despite an offer by Browne to be replaced by a different moderator for the debate if Kenny would appear.

Kenny participated in a three-party leader debate on RTÉ moderated by Miriam O'Callaghan, and also in a five-way debate on RTÉ; this was a new format, involving all party leaders of the outgoing Dáil, including Kenny, moderated by Pat Kenny.

He participated in a three-way debate in the Irish language with Micheál Martin and Eamon Gilmore on TG4.

On 14 February 2011, Kenny met German Chancellor Angela Merkel to discuss the Irish economy. Kenny and Merkel have close political ties because Merkel's CDU party and Fine Gael are both members of the centre-right European People's Party (EPP), and the seating at EPP meetings is arranged by alphabetical order of the surname. The close relationship between these two leaders is illustrated further by the fact that Angela Merkel also backed Enda Kenny and Fine Gael during the 2007 election.

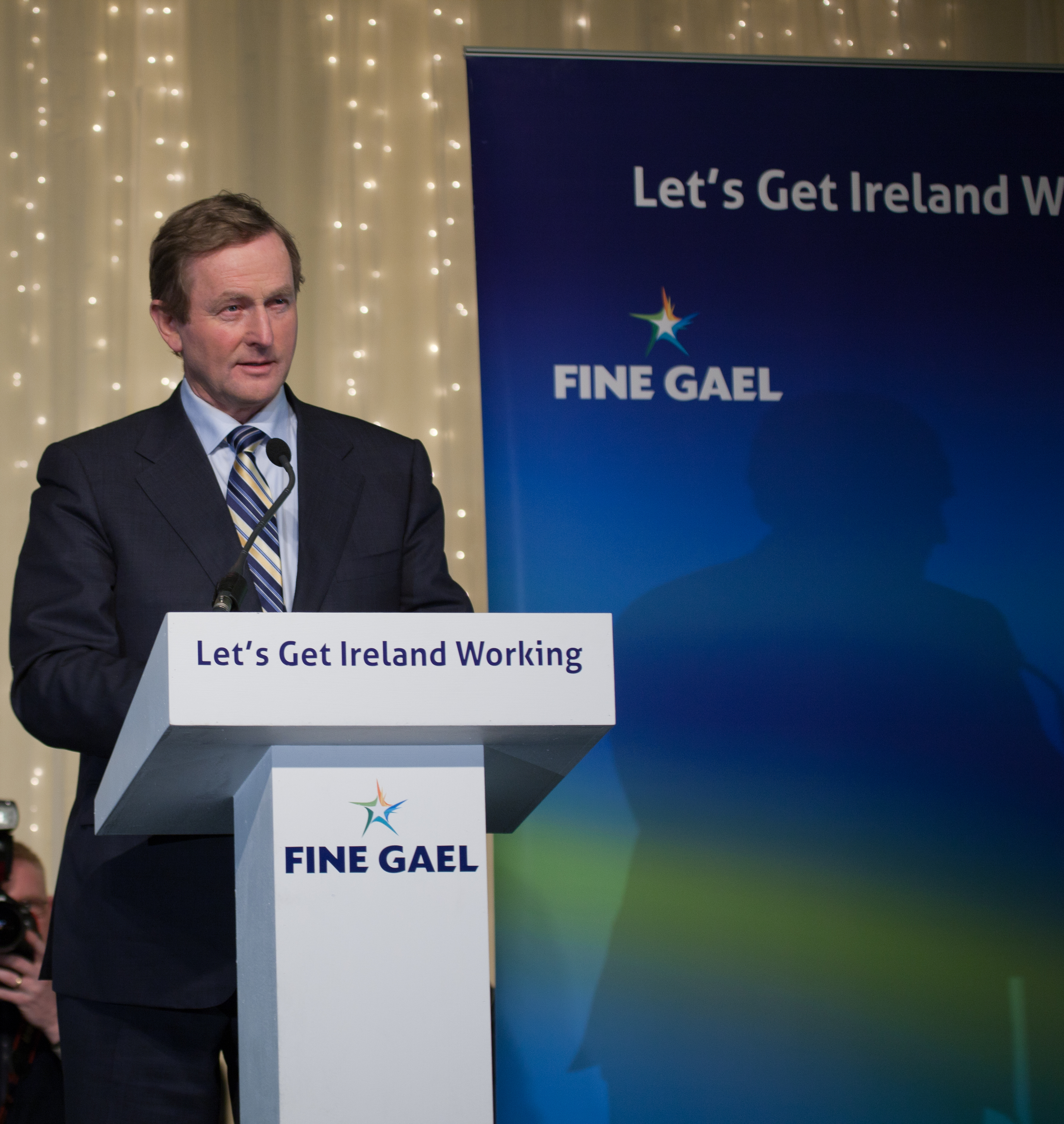
Kenny makes a speech to Fine Gael party members on the day of the election results

Opinion polls of 23 February 2011, sponsored by Paddy Power, the Irish Independent, and The Irish Times suggested that Kenny would lead Fine Gael to its largest total of seats to date in the 31st Dáil, and that he would be elected Taoiseach.

In the election, Kenny led Fine Gael to a decisive victory. The party won 76 seats, the most in its 78-year history, becoming the largest party in the Dáil for the first time. Meanwhile, Fianna Fáil suffered the worst defeat of a sitting government in the history of the Irish state, its representation being reduced by 75%. Kenny himself topped the poll in his Mayo constituency and uniquely three others from Fine Gael were elected alongside Kenny. At a victory party in Dublin, Kenny declared Fine Gael had "a massive endorsement" to govern, and the election marked "a transformative moment in Ireland's history". Later, he told RTÉ that he fully expected to become Taoiseach after what he called "a democratic revolution at the ballot box". While there was some talk that Fine Gael would govern alone as a minority government, senior Fine Gael leaders indicated as soon as the election result was beyond doubt that they would likely enter a coalition government with the Labour Party. Late on the night of 5 March 2011, at Dublin Castle, Fine Gael and Labour formally agreed to form a coalition government with Kenny as Taoiseach and Labour leader Eamon Gilmore as Tánaiste, with Labour being given four other seats in cabinet.

Kenny said that his first priority upon taking office would be to renegotiate the terms of the bailout for Ireland, calling the original deal "a bad deal for Ireland and a bad deal for Europe".

== Taoiseach (2011–2017) ==
=== 2011 ===
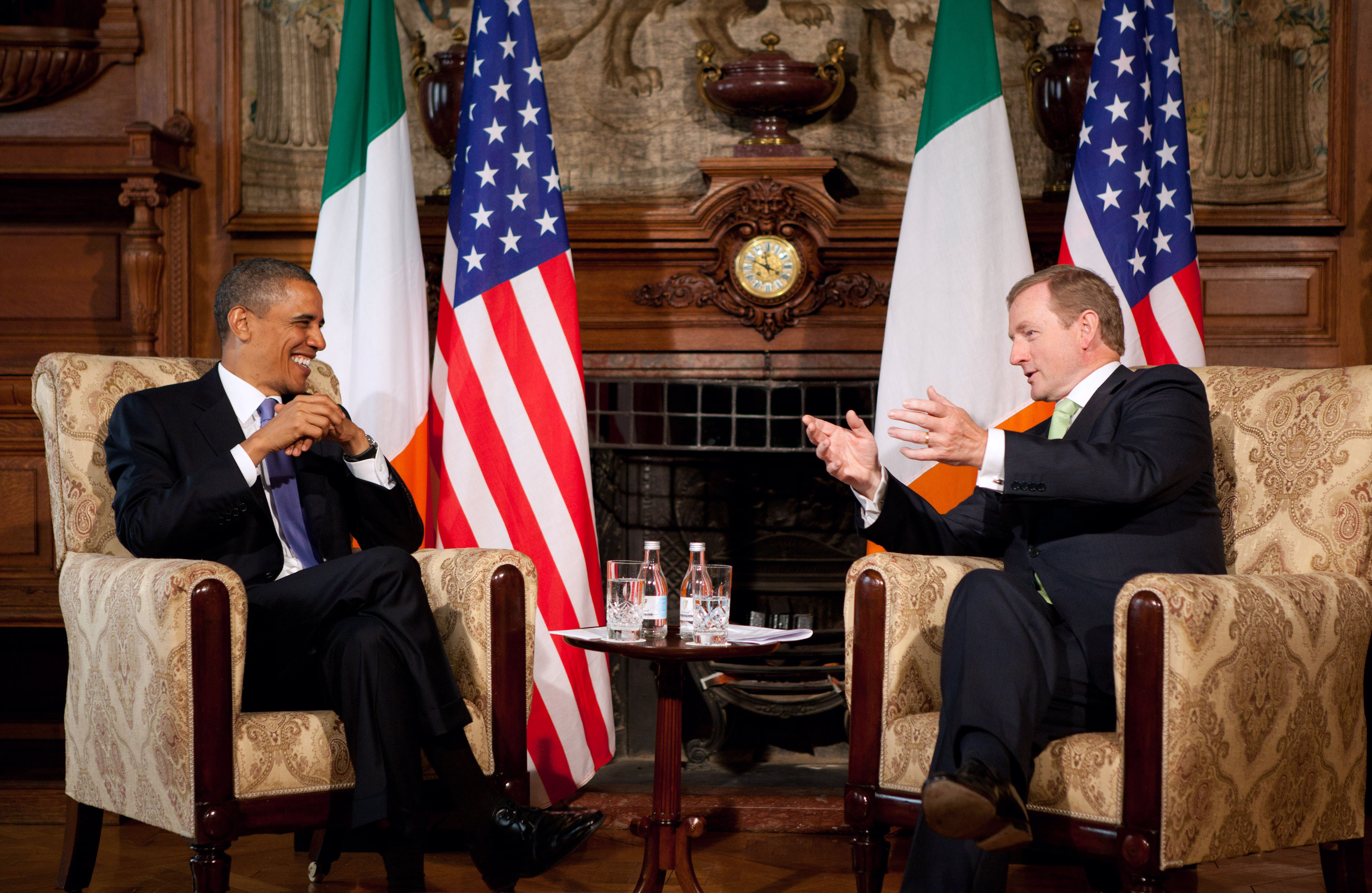
Kenny with US president Barack Obama in May 2011

The 31st Dáil convened for the first time on 9 March 2011, the Dáil nominated Kenny for appointment as Taoiseach by a vote of 117–27. Kenny received his seal of office from President Mary McAleese. He also announced ministerial appointees to his Government on 9 March 2011. At just under 59 years and 11 months on accession, Kenny was the second-oldest person to have assumed the office for the first time, the oldest being Seán Lemass.

On 9 March 2011, Kenny appointed 15 junior Ministers. He also appointed a minister for political reform, and sent a request to the Office of Public Works as to how he could address ministerial transport. On 15 March 2011, it was announced that only the current president, the Taoiseach, the Tánaiste and the Minister for Justice and Equality were to have Garda drivers. All other Ministers would have to make use of their own transport with a mileage allowance and a commercial chauffeur as an expense. There was no announcement as to the continuing engagement of three government jets.

==== Ministerial pay cuts ====
In one of his first acts as Taoiseach, Kenny reduced his own pay and that of senior Ministers.

==== Financial and banking policy ====
On 11 March 2011, Kenny attended his first European Council as Taoiseach, in Brussels. During that summit, he engaged in a heated confrontation with President of France Nicolas Sarkozy (which Kenny termed "a Gallic spat") over Ireland's comparatively low 12.5% corporate tax rate, which EU leaders have frequently posited as a condition of more favourable terms for the Irish bailout. Kenny held firm on his refusal to alter the corporate tax, which he reiterated in his first Leaders' Questions the following week—also declaring his government's intention to withhold further state funds from Dublin banks until the EU agreed to new terms that forced banks' senior bondholders to share in the losses.

However, less than three weeks later, on 31 March 2011, the Central Bank of Ireland published the results of its "stress tests" on Ireland's four surviving banks (Allied Irish Banks, Bank of Ireland, EBS, and Irish Life & Permanent) — indicating that the banks needed to raise an additional €24,000,000,000 to remain solvent. Despite his earlier promise, the government announced the same day that the state would supply the necessary funds to keep the banks afloat, with Kenny stating that seeking the money from bondholders would be neither "reasonable or logical".

Kenny was heavily criticised for his government's action, with the Irish Independent noting that "this is the fifth time Irish people have been told over the past couple of years it would be the last payout they would have to endure".

Nevertheless, the first national opinion poll since Kenny took office, published on 10 April 2011, showed that public support for Kenny's Fine Gael party had increased since the election from 36% to 39%, although a plurality also indicated deep dissatisfaction with his rescue of the banks.

2011 also saw the introduction of clampdowns on banker salaries, banker bonuses and an effective ban on variable pay, including for things like private health insurance and childcare. A salary cap of €500,000 was introduced to bankers in the bailed out Irish banks. This represented a cut of as high as 87.5% from top banker salaries of €4 million during 2006. An 89% 'Super Tax' was introduced on banker bonuses above €20,000. These measures were only relaxed in 2023.

On 21 July 2011, Kenny announced that an agreement had been reached by Eurozone leaders to reduce Ireland's interest rate by 2% and extend the repayment period.

==== Pension levy controversy ====
On 9 May 2011, Kenny's government announced a new job creation program, along with a plan to finance it via a 0.6% tax levy on private pension savings. Public pension funds, however, would remain untouched. The pension levy caused an immediate and intense outcry, leaving Kenny to defend the initiative as "a modest proposal" and refuting charges that the government would next tax personal savings. However, the controversy surrounding the levy intensified on 12 May 2011, when Kenny admitted that the holders of Approved Retirement Funds—most of whom were among the highest income earners in Ireland—would not be included in the levy.

==== Political reforms ====
On 3 May 2011, Kenny's government approved a set of political reforms that adhered to promises he had made in the general election. Among the approved reforms were a binding Constituency Commission scheduled for June 2011, with the specific purpose of reducing the number of TDs by up to 20; an act to establish a six-month time limit for holding by-elections to the Dáil; a €750,000 spending limit in the 2011 presidential election; legislation to ban corporate donations, to be enacted by summer 2011; establishment of a Constitutional Convention in 2011, which was to include discussion of the future of the Seanad; and a referendum on its abolition, to be held in the second half of 2012. The promise to cut up to 20 TDs caused some controversy and scepticism, due to the Constitutional requirement that there be no less than one TD for every 30,000 people, which would necessitate a minimum of 150 TDs—meaning that the current number of 166 TDs could be reduced by 16 at most.

==== Vatican reprimand and response ====
On 13 July 2011, the Cloyne Report was published, detailing the investigation into allegations of child sexual abuse by 19 priests in the Roman Catholic Diocese of Cloyne. Among the report's findings were the revelation that the vast majority of allegations made in the diocese were not reported to the Gardaí, as required by the Church's 1996 guidelines; that the Bishop of the Diocese, John Magee, and others had withheld full co-operation with the Government's investigation and had deliberately misrepresented his own response to the allegations; and that the Vatican itself had both refused to co-operate in the investigation and counselled the Diocese that the 1996 guidelines were not binding.

On 20 July 2011, Kenny condemned the Vatican for its role in the scandal, stating that the Church's role in obstructing the investigation was a serious infringement upon the sovereignty of Ireland and that the scandal revealed "the dysfunction, disconnection and elitism that dominates the culture of the Vatican to this day". He added that "the historic relationship between church and state in Ireland could not be the same again".

Kenny's attack on the Vatican was unprecedented by a high-level official in Ireland. The speech was widely regarded as extraordinary, with the Daily Mail commenting that the attack was "the first time that Ireland's Parliament has publicly castigated the Vatican instead of local church leaders during the country's 17 years of paedophile-priest scandals". The Guardian remarked that "the political classes have...lost their fear, namely of the once almighty Roman Catholic church."

On 3 September, the Holy See issued its response to Kenny's speech noting that "the accusation that the Holy See attempted "to frustrate an Inquiry in a sovereign, democratic republic as little as three years ago, not three decades ago", which Kenny made no attempt to substantiate, is unfounded. Indeed, when asked, a Government spokesperson clarified that Kenny was not referring to any specific incident". The response added that "Those Reports [...] contain no evidence to suggest that the Holy See meddled in the internal affairs of the Irish State or, for that matter, was involved in the day-to-day management of Irish dioceses or religious congregations with respect to sexual abuse issues".

==== First national address ====
Kenny gave a televised address to the nation on 4 December 2011, ahead of the delivery of the 2012 Irish budget. He warned that Budget 2012 "will be tough", and that "it has to be". He also said that it would move Ireland towards a manageable deficit of 3% of GDP by 2015. This was only the sixth time that a Taoiseach had addressed the nation, reflecting the gravity of the Irish economic condition, in what Kenny stressed were "exceptional" circumstances. The broadcast was the second-most watched television programme of 2011 in Ireland, attracting an audience of 1.2 million viewers.

=== 2012 ===
==== Time magazine cover ====
In October 2012, Kenny became the first Taoiseach since Seán Lemass to be featured on the cover of Time. The related article, entitled "The Celtic Comeback", "glows" about Kenny's performance as Taoiseach and says he is "underestimated" by the Irish public. Catherine Mayer, who wrote the article, described Kenny as "charming", "shrewd" and "extremely likeable". Mayer said that what she was really trying to see was "what was behind that likability". "In small groups he is much more fluent and compelling than he would appear to be were you to judge him from his big media set pieces. When cameras train on him he seems to freeze up, which is an interesting problem for somebody in that position. But when he's relaxed he's interesting and has a lot to say," she said. In the article, Kenny stated; "I've no interest in looking for credit or thanks. Providing a prosperous future for all our people, that's what drives me."

==== European of the Year Winner ====
On 8 November 2012, Kenny won the "Golden Victoria European of the Year 2012" award. The award is presented by the German Magazine Publishers Association (VDZ) and previous winners of the award include José Manuel Barroso and Donald Tusk.

In a statement the publishers said they had chosen Kenny as the winner because of his "strong contribution to Europe and commitment to European ideals both as Prime Minister and throughout his many years in public life". They added that "In these difficult times, Europe benefits from the open, outward looking character of the Irish State and people and from the calibre of its Prime Minister, Enda Kenny."

Enda Kenny said he felt privileged to accept the award "on behalf of the Irish people at home and overseas" at a ceremony in Berlin. The Taoiseach said Ireland's commitment and contribution to Europe "far exceed" the country's 40-year EU membership, and pointed out that the people of Ireland voted "more often more positively on Europe than any other EU member."

==== Nobel Peace Prize ====
To complete a string of awards in late 2012, on 10 December Kenny was one of 20 EU Leaders chosen to travel to Oslo to accept the Nobel Peace Prize on behalf of the European Union.

The chair of the Nobel Committee, Thorbjorn Jagland, said the award was both deserved and necessary. He said the EU needs to move forward to consolidate the efforts, which delivered a continent of peace.

=== 2013 ===
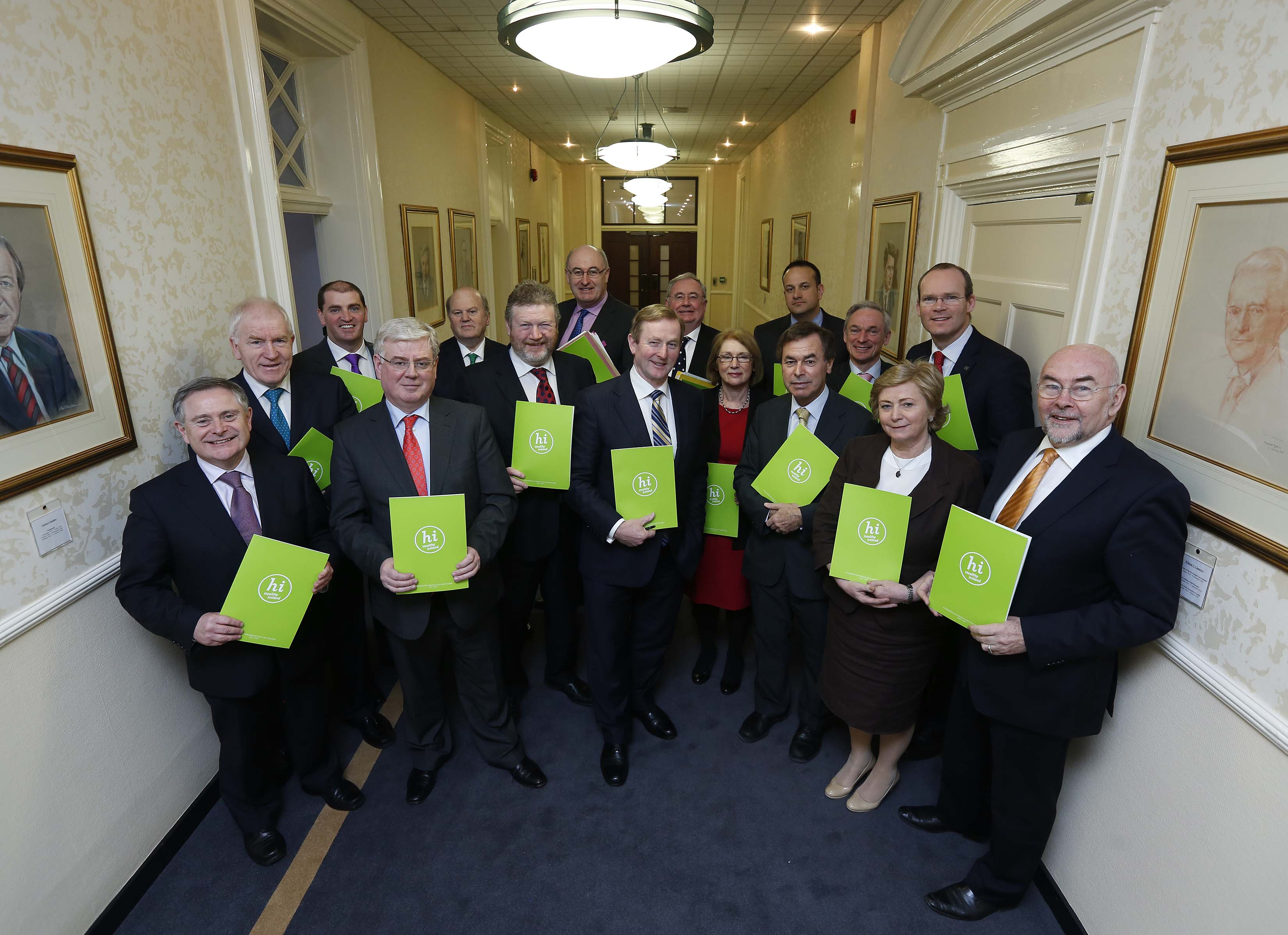
Taoiseach Enda Kenny, with his cabinet in March 2013

==== Presidency of the Council of the European Union ====
For the first six months of 2013, Ireland took the Presidency of the Council of the European Union. The presidency is not an individual, but rather the position is held by a national government. The presidency's function is to chair meetings of the council, determine its agendas, set a work program and facilitate dialogue both at council meetings and with other EU institutions.

Despite a reduced budget, in May 2013 talks in Brussels chaired by Kenny and Tánaiste Eamon Gilmore saw the deadlock over the EU's nearly €1 trillion budget, which had persisted since November the previous year, finally broken.

==== Promissory notes ====
In February 2013, a deal was reached with the European Central Bank, in relation to the promissory note used to bail out the former Anglo Irish Bank. Kenny described it as "a good day for the country and its people". He told the Dáil that, as a result of the changes, there would be a €20 billion reduction in the borrowing requirement of the National Treasury Management Agency in the years ahead, but also cautioned that the agreement was not a "silver bullet".

==== Magdalene laundries apology ====
On 19 February 2013, Kenny apologised in the Dáil on behalf of the State to the survivors of the Magdalene laundries. The government also told the estimated 800 to 1,000 surviving Magdalene women that a compensation scheme would be set up for them. The scheme was created in December 2013 and by March 2022, a total of €32.8 million had so far been paid by the State, in awards of up to €100,000, to 814 survivors.

==== Rumoured links to top European jobs ====
In mid 2013 Enda Kenny began to be linked with two high-profiled and powerful jobs in the EU. In August, Kenny became the frontrunner to take over the powerful post of European Council president (who chairs the meetings of EU leaders where all the major decisions are made) while he had an outside shot for the post of European Commission president (the head of the EU cabinet) according to an analysis of the contenders conducted by the influential Brussels-based opinion-shaper; Burson-Marsteller.

Kenny was in contention as he was seen as "capable but not a big name with an ego". He had "a good profile for the European Council job in particular – a consensus-builder from a small member state who has had some success at EU level with his successful steering of negotiations on the EU's long-term budget during the Irish presidency."

Rumours persisted and in June 2014 Kenny again dismissed speculation that he could be appointed the new president of the European Commission stating that "I've a job to do here". David Cameron confirmed in his autobiography that he and Angela Merkel sounded out Kenny for the European Commission president post in 2014.

Kenny was still being linked to the post of president of the European Council as late as 2017 after he announced he was stepping down as Taoiseach and leader of Fine Gael. Senior EU sources told the Sunday Independent that the president at that time, Donald Tusk, might not stay for another term in office after he failed to get the backing of his home country, Poland, for a second stint in the office.

The EU source said there was "significant pressure" on the Taoiseach from the European People's Party (EPP) to take the job three years ago and that "If Tusk steps out of the field Kenny would be the clear favourite to take over".

==== Protection of Life During Pregnancy Act ====
In 2013, Kenny's government the Protection of Life During Pregnancy Act 2013 which, until 2018, defined the circumstances and processes within which abortion in Ireland could be legally performed. The act gave effect in statutory law to the terms of the Constitution as interpreted by the Supreme Court in the 1992 judgment in the X Case. That judgment allowed for abortion where pregnancy endangers a woman's life, including through a risk of suicide. The provisions relating to suicide had been the most contentious part of the bill. Having passed both Houses of the Oireachtas in July 2013, it was signed into law on 30 July by Michael D. Higgins, the President of Ireland, and commenced on 1 January 2014. The 2013 Act was repealed by the Health (Regulation of Termination of Pregnancy) Act 2018, which commenced on 1 January 2019.

Political biographer John Downing said that, as Taoiseach, Kenny "faced down traditionalists and legislated for a restricted form of abortion to be made legal". He went on to say that Kenny "skillfuly legislated for this, which had been ignored in Ireland for 20 years. Everyone kicked to touch on it but he took it on".

==== Ireland becomes the first country to exit a Troika bailout ====
Three years after being saved from bankruptcy by a trio of international lenders with a €67.5bn loan (the so-called "troika"), in December 2013 Kenny's coalition government led Ireland out of the eurozone bailout programme, becoming the first country to do so.

The view of Ireland held by other eurozone leaders greatly improved with Ireland's recovery and exit and Enda Kenny was praised by German Chancellor Angela Merkel for implementing cuts in public spending. The exit meant Ireland regained its economic sovereignty on 15 December 2013.

==== Second national address ====
To mark the end of the Troika bailout in December 2013, Kenny gave a second address to the nation, saying that the country was moving in the right direction and that the economy was starting to recover.

=== 2014 ===
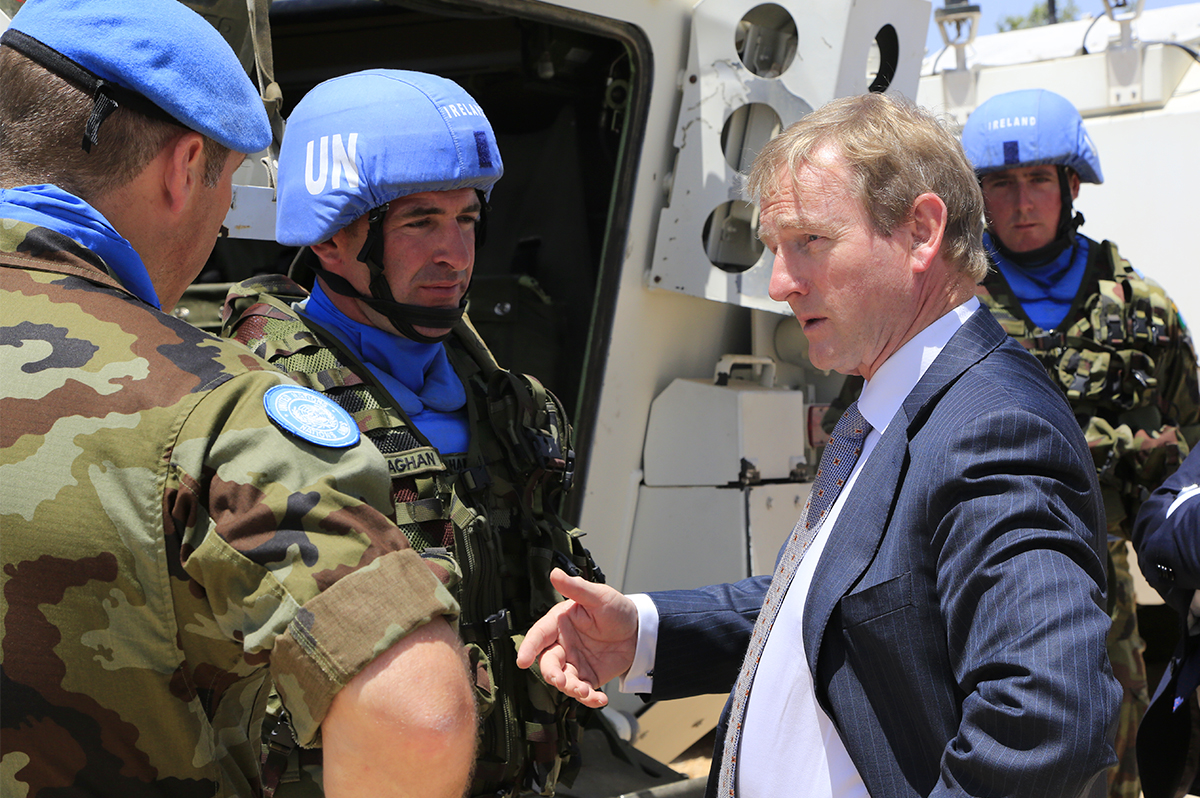
Kenny meeting members of Ireland's Defence Forces deployed on a UN mission in Lebanon in June 2014

==== Resignations of Martin Callinan and Alan Shatter ====
In March 2014, in response to reports that Garda stations were bugged, Kenny informed the Dáil that he had sent Brian Purcell, the secretary general of the Department of Justice, to Garda Commissioner Martin Callinan, the day before Callinan's sudden departure from his role. Leader of the Opposition Micheál Martin said this meant Kenny had effectively "sacked" Callinan. Kenny also said that he had been personally briefed on Garda surveillance by his Attorney General Máire Whelan, as Whelan did not wish to speak of the matter over the telephone.

In May 2014, following the resignation of Minister for Justice and Equality Alan Shatter, support for Kenny and his party dropped at the local and European elections, although Fine Gael managed to retain its four European Parliament seats.

=== 2015 ===
==== Marriage Equality referendum ====
In May 2015, under Kenny's leadership, Ireland became the first country to legalise same-sex marriage by popular vote. It was approved on 22 May 2015 by 62% of voters on a turnout of 61%.

Kenny's Fine Gael party, along with the three other main parties in the Dáil, supported the bill and actively campaigned on its behalf. Kenny said "With today's Yes vote we have disclosed who we are – a generous, compassionate, bold and joyful people. The referendum was about inclusiveness and equality, about love and commitment being enshrined in the constitution. The people have spoken. They have said yes. Ireland – thank you."

==== Other activities ====
As an avid Gaeligeoir, in March 2015, Kenny was criticised for his lack of understanding towards Wexford TD Mick Wallace's inability to speak Irish, during leader's questions in the Dáil.

On 22 September 2015, Kenny controversially delayed leaders' questions in the Dáil so that he could open the Denis O'Brien-controlled Independent News & Media's new digital hub. Kenny had previously launched a book for James Morrissey, the long-term paid spokesperson for O'Brien.

A "punching gesture" made by Kenny as Mary Lou McDonald was speaking during a Dáil debate on the Budget on 13 October 2015, attracted public notice. McDonald later responded by saying, "a punching gesture is unusual behaviour to say the least and I would suggest not to be repeated".

Later that month, Kenny told a gathering of the European People's Party (EPP) in Madrid, that he had been instructed to have the army guarded ATMs, during the economic downturn. Opposition TDs wondered why he did not tell this to the banking inquiry and Kenny was accused of "telling a tall tale". Kenny himself later contradicted his own account by saying he had not received a specific briefing on the matter. A spokesman for Kenny later claimed it had been "informally discussed" in Government Buildings in early 2012, but that minutes had not been kept due to the sensitivity of the details therein.

=== 2016 ===
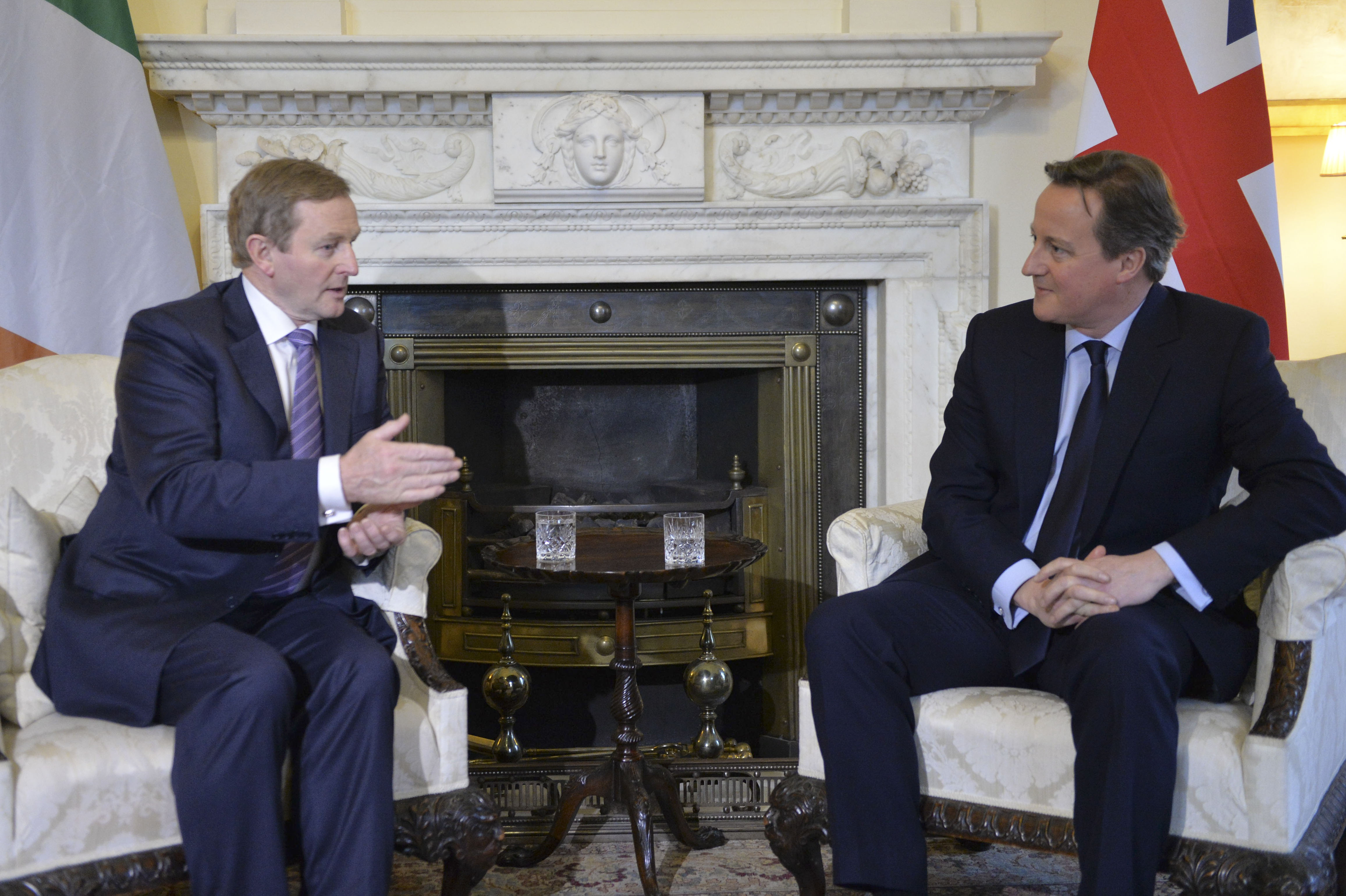
Kenny with British prime minister David Cameron in January 2016

==== Election 2016 and Taoiseach for a second time ====
On 3 February 2016, Kenny announced his intention to request that President Higgins dissolve the 31st Dáil. He told the Dáil before its dissolution that the 2016 general election would occur on Friday, 26 February.

At a Fine Gael rally in his home town of Castlebar, County Mayo, on 20 February 2016, Kenny informed an audience that his local constituents were All-Ireland champion "whingers". He later told media in Galway, that he was referring to local Fianna Fáil members.

Fine Gael won 50 seats in the 32nd Dáil, 29 short of an overall majority. Preliminary discussions took place with Leader of the Opposition Micheál Martin, in order to agree on an arrangement to support either Kenny, Fine Gael or under a new leader to form a new government. On 10 March 2016, Kenny resigned as Taoiseach, after failing to win enough votes to be elected for a second term. He and the cabinet continued in a caretaker capacity until a new government was formed.

As caretaker Kenny went to Washington, D.C., as usual for Saint Patrick's Day. There he was reported as having told the Irish Embassy: "Bejaysus, I wish I didn't have to go back and face what I have to face". He also met President Barack Obama, as part of the annual visit of the Taoiseach to the White House, for the handing over of the bowl of shamrock.

On 29 April 2016, an agreement was reached with Fianna Fáil to allow a Fine Gael–led minority government, and on 6 May 2016, Kenny was elected Taoiseach again, by a margin of 59 to 49 votes (with 51 abstentions), and formed a government. He became the first member of Fine Gael to win re-election as Taoiseach in the party's history. Kenny also took over as Minister for Defence, from Simon Coveney, who was appointed Minister for Housing, Planning, Community and Local Government.

==== Brexit ====
Regarding the United Kingdom European Union membership referendum, Kenny went on record as saying the possibility of a "Brexit" would cause a "serious difficulty" with maintaining peace in Northern Ireland. He was described as favouring Britain remaining in the European Union, for were Britain to leave the EU, the peace settlement in Northern Ireland might collapse. This statement was denounced by Theresa Villiers, the British Secretary of State for Northern Ireland, as "scaremongering of the worst possible kind"; she stated that the Common Travel Area, the "open border" encompassing the United Kingdom and Ireland, would not be affected by Britain's departure from the EU.

==== Citizens' Assembly ====
The programme agreed by the Fine Gael–independent minority government formed after the 2016 election and under Kenny's leadership included this commitment:

We will establish a Citizens' Assembly, within six months, and without participation by politicians, and with a mandate to look at a limited number of key issues over an extended time period. These issues will not be limited to those directly pertaining to the constitution and may include issues such as, for example how we, as a nation, best respond to the challenges and opportunities of an ageing population. That said, we will ask the Citizens' Assembly to make recommendations to the Dáil on further constitutional changes, including on the Eighth Amendment, on fixed term parliaments and on the manner in which referenda are held (e.g. should 'super referendum days', whereby a significant number of referenda take place on the same day, be held).

On 13 July 2016, Damien English moved a resolution in the 32nd Dáil (lower house) approving the "calling of a Citizens' Assembly" to consider the four issues specified in the government programme and "such other matters as may be referred to it". A Green Party amendment was accepted which added "how the State can make Ireland a leader in tackling climate change" to the list of topics.

The first issue to be considered was the Eighth Amendment, beginning at its first working meeting on 25 November 2016. Enda Kenny in September 2016 estimated it could take "six to seven months" to issue a report, which was referred to an Oireachtas joint committee, This committee, in turn, produced a report for debate in each house. Resolutions to establish the "Special Joint Committee on the Eighth Amendment of the Constitution" were passed on 4 and 13 April 2017 by the Dáil and Seanad respectively.

Since then, Irish citizens' assemblies have made important contributions on issues like population aging, climate change and gay marriage.

Ireland is seen as a leading light in the world of citizens' assemblies. Political commentator David Van Reybrouck called it "the most innovative democracy in Europe". In an open letter featured in several European newspapers, Reybrouck said "Come on, take Europeans seriously. Let them speak. Why educate the masses if they are still not allowed to talk? Look at Ireland, the most innovative democracy in Europe. A few weeks ago, a random sample of one hundred Irish citizens, drafted by lot, was brought together into a Citizens' Assembly. This is a country that trusts its citizens, instead of fearing them."

=== 2017 ===
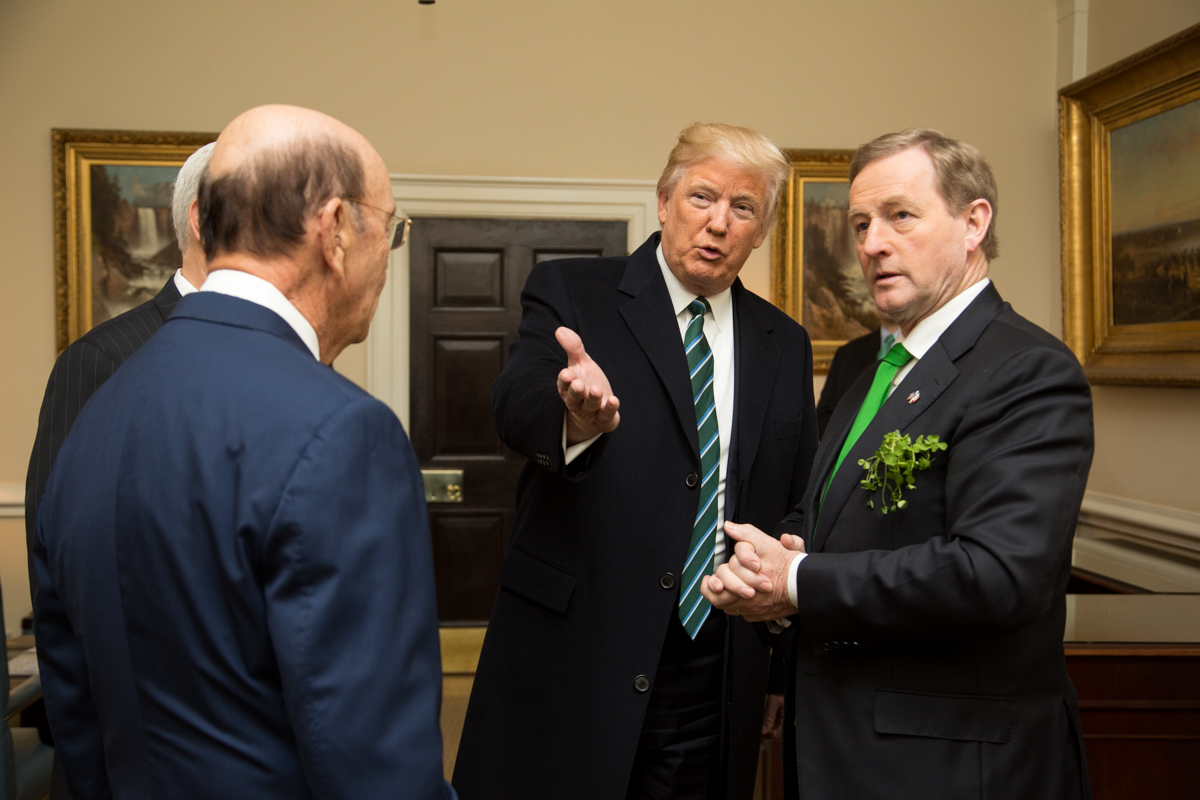
Kenny with US president Donald Trump in March 2017

On 30 January 2017, a joint press meeting was held between Enda Kenny and British Prime Minister Theresa May, in Merrion Street, Dublin, to discuss the implications of Brexit on Northern Ireland and Ireland.

After the 2016 general election, there were calls for him to step down as Leader of Fine Gael, and thus as Taoiseach. After the uncovering of the Garda smear campaign of sergeant Maurice McCabe, some backbench TDs lost confidence in Kenny. Kenny had stated he would indicate his plans for a leadership change following his return from the US for the traditional St. Patrick's Day celebrations; however, at the St. Patrick's Day parade in New York City, Kenny stated that he would not stand down from leadership until the issues of Brexit and the aftermath of the snap election in Northern Ireland had been resolved, saying that "you can't have a situation where you have no leadership in Northern Ireland and where we have to define from a European Union point of view where Ireland would be, what the agreed terms of reference for the [Brexit] negotiations are". He also remarked that he and Prime Minister May were in agreement that there would not be a return to direct rule from Westminster in Northern Ireland. On 20 March, Finance Minister Michael Noonan stated that Kenny should remain in office at least until June, when the next phase of EU Brexit negotiations was set to begin. The following day, Kenny announced that he would not consider standing down until May at the earliest, and that he planned to attend the European Council on 29 April 2017, to discuss strategy surrounding Brexit.

==== St. Patrick's Day White House Speech ====
Enda Kenny's speech on the value of immigration in front of the US president Donald Trump went viral in March 2017 and was widely praised. A video clip of part of the speech had over 30 million views in just two days.

==== United Ireland clause ====
During the Brexit negotiations of 2017, Enda Kenny insisted on the inclusion of a united Ireland clause. The text spelt out that in the event of a future unity referendum in Ireland, as envisaged by the Good Friday Agreement, Northern Ireland would automatically rejoin the European Union.

The British government attempted to block the insertion of the Irish unity clause into the text of an extraordinary summit of EU leaders at the end of April, with Irish officials being subjected to what one source described as 'a sustained diplomatic offensive' by Britain. Officials from the British Department for Exiting the EU tried to set up a phone call between Prime Minister Theresa May and Kenny on the issue. However, the officials were told that the phone call would not happen, and that Kenny was 'sticking to his guns'. Enda Kenny requested the clause and it was unanimously adopted by the other 26 member states. Political Editor Daniel McConnell argues that the specific mention of Irish unity, known as 'the Kenny text' in the Brexit talks agenda, was Kenny's crowning achievement.

==== Connacht GAA Centre of Excellence ====
Enda Kenny was credited with making the world's largest sports air dome, located just outside Knock, County Mayo, a financially feasible project. Though an indoor playing facility of some description was in the long-term plans when the sod was first turned at the facility in 2010, it wasn't until 2017 when the right path became clear thanks to the surprise visit of Kenny during his time in office.

Calling in for an unannounced look around, it was the Taoiseach who first suggested installing an air dome, similar to the one used by his local tennis club in Castlebar. That was the Eureka moment. Connacht GAA secretary John Prenty and Cathal Cregg, the provincial games manager based at the centre, executed on the idea.

As the groundworks were already in place, the structure, covering 15,000m2 in size, took just five employees and only one month to erect. The completed project includes a facility 26 metres in height at its highest point, 150m in length and 100m wide. It has a 30m running track on one side of the pitch with a capacity to insert seating for 600 people on the opposite side. Light, cameras and speakers are suspended against the structure right the way around. The project cost €3.1 million.

Playing opportunities are only the beginning for the air dome. With the ability to host 10,000 people in a concert setting, the dome is one of the largest indoor venues in Ireland. It could host concerts, conferences, trade exhibitions and more. But it will be first and foremost a GAA facility that can pay for itself in the short- and long-term. "The opportunities are limitless," said Prenty.

==== Retirement ====
On 17 May 2017, Kenny announced his intention to step down as party leader, effective at midnight. He requested that the party conclude the election of his successor by 2 June 2017, and said that he would step down as Taoiseach shortly thereafter. In the ensuing election, Minister for Social Protection Leo Varadkar was elected Leader of Fine Gael. In a statement, Kenny offered his "heartiest congratulations" to Varadkar, saying "this is a tremendous honour for him and I know he will devote his life to improving the lives of people across our country".

In early June 2017, Kenny made his final trip to the U.S. as Taoiseach. While in Chicago on 4 June 2017, he was in attendance at Soldier Field for Irish rock band U2's performance as part of their Joshua Tree Tour. U2 lead singer Bono dedicated their performance of the song "Trip Through Your Wires" to Kenny, saying "The man we call Taoiseach, which I think might mean head of the house or something like that... The chieftain of our country is here tonight! ...We'd like to honour our graceful leader."

On 13 June 2017, Kenny tendered his resignation as Taoiseach. The following day, 14 June 2017, he nominated Varadkar to formally succeed him as Taoiseach in the Dáil; the Dáil approved the nomination. Kenny then made his farewell address to the Dáil, quoting U.S. President Theodore Roosevelt: "Far and away, the best prize that life has to offer is a chance to work hard at work worth doing". After receiving a standing ovation from the Dáil, Kenny departed for Áras an Uachtaráin and submitted his resignation to President Michael D. Higgins. In his last duty as Taoiseach he advised the President that the Dáil had nominated Varadkar as Taoiseach and that the President should thus invite him to form a new government and appoint him as Taoiseach in accordance with the constitution.

=== Return to the backbenches (2017–2020) ===
On 29 December 2017, Kenny was a wedding guest of Fine Gael Senator Jerry Buttimer in Cork. When a reporter took the opportunity to remind him of a nearby event centre of which Kenny had "turned the sod" nearly two years previously, but of which the construction was now halted, Kenny made it known he was there to attend a marriage.

In June 2018, Kenny was named 'Irish European of the Year' for "his outstanding contribution to promoting and developing Ireland's place in Europe through some of the most challenging circumstances in our history around the time of the Brexit referendum to also chairing the European Council and developing and promoting our relationship with the European Union".

In October 2019, RTÉ Investigates reported that Kenny had voted in the Dáil on just three occasions in 2019 (two of those votes taking place on the same day), and had missed 96% of votes that took place between June 2017 and July 2019. In total, he had voted just 15 times in that period out of a possible 400 votes. The report stated that Kenny's attendance in the Dáil had been registered on 263 days during that period, and that he had claimed the full travel and accommodation allowance of €47,000 to which he was entitled, in addition to his salary.

==== TK Whitaker Award for Outstanding Contribution to Public Life ====
In December 2017, Kenny was awarded the 'TK Whitaker Award for Outstanding Contribution to Public Life' at the 43rd annual Business & Finance Awards, at a ceremony in Dublin. Kenny was said to have delivered "a wide-ranging and truly fascinating speech" in which "he spoke of many of the trials, tribulations and highlights of his career, giving the crowd both ample cause for reflection, as well as many moments of laughter."

Previous and subsequent winners of the award include Presidents of Ireland Michael D. Higgins and Mary McAleese and Irish actor Gabriel Byrne.

== Post-political activity ==
=== Iarnród Enda (2021) ===
He presented a six part Irish language television series about old Irish railway routes on RTÉ One in 2021, called Iarnród Enda. It commenced broadcasting on Monday 5 April 2021. Kenny donated his salary from the show to the Mayo Roscommon Hospice.

=== Other activity ===
In 2019, Kenny was appointed chair of the global advisory board of Dublin private equity firm Venturewave Capital. In August 2021, Kenny joined the board of Heneghan Strategic Communications, the lobbying and public relations agency run by Nigel Heneghan. In September 2021, he joined the board of Dublin-headquartered 'mechanical tree' firm Carbon Collect as a non-executive director.

=== Honorary doctorates ===
Enda Kenny has been awarded at least three honorary doctorates for his services to public life in Ireland. These include an honorary Doctor of Laws (LLD) from the National University of Ireland (NUI), a Doctor of Laws from Queen's University Belfast for his contribution to public service and an honorary doctorate from Dublin City University for his "extraordinary contribution to public life".

== Legacy ==
=== Fine Gael ===
Kenny left a lasting impact on his Fine Gael party. He is the only person in modern Irish politics to take control of a major political party from the back benches. When he became Fine Gael party leader in 2002, Fine Gael had won just 31 seats in the previous 2002 general election, 23 seats fewer than the 1997 general election. Under his leadership, Kenny grew the party in every election he contested (general, local and European) until his last general election in 2016. This run included winning 76 seats in the 2011 general election, a gain of 45 seats from when he took over the party leadership in 2002. This significant gain resulted in Fine Gael becoming the largest party in Dáil Éireann for the first time in its 78-year history.

The 2011 general election victory also included a historic 4 out of 5 seats won by Fine Gael candidates in Kenny's Mayo constituency (with Kenny himself topping the poll). This had never been achieved by any political party in a 5-seat constituency before. According to political pundit Kevin Doyle, "everyone in the party recognises that he leaves it in a toe-to-toe battle with Fianna Fáil ahead. When he took over they weren't even at the races".

When Kenny stepped down he was the longest-serving Fine Gael Taoiseach. His government was "relatively scandal free" and "for the longest time he was the most underestimated person in Irish politics".

=== Repaired and resurgent Economy ===
Kenny's tenure as Taoiseach was dominated by the introduction of austerity policies in the aftermath of the economic recession. These policies began under the previous Fianna Fáil government in 2008, and continued for much of his first term. Overall, the impact of these budgets has been described as not conforming to "either a progressive pattern (losses increasing with income) or regressive pattern (losses declining with income)" by the Economic and Social Research Institute.

Despite the economic climate in which he took over, for many political pundits including Fergus Finlay and David Davin-Power, Kenny ranks high on the list of the greatest Taoisigh of all time. During his time in office, Kenny's government regained Irish sovereignty after one of the worst economic crises in Irish history. When Kenny took office as Taoiseach in 2011, the unemployment rate for the State on a Principal Economic Status basis was 19%. By the time he stepped down as Taoiseach in 2017 the unemployment rate was just 6.4%.

In a similar vein, in Kenny's first year in office Irish emigration levels reached 87,100 people per year. When he stepped down in 2017 this figure had reduced by nearly 30% to 64,800 people. Fewer than half of those emigrating in 2017 were Irish nationals.

Kenny also oversaw a reduction of €28,837 in the Taoiseach's salary in two separate cuts. He sold the state owned jet and cut Garda drivers for his own cabinet ministers and for all retired Taoisigh.

During the 2011 election campaign Kenny vowed to make Ireland the best small country in the world to do business. By the end of his tenure as Taoiseach, various studies suggested that Ireland, even if not the best in the world, at least ranked very highly in this regard.

When Enda Kenny stepped down, Ireland had the fastest-growing economy in Europe. Political biographer John Downing believes Kenny's relentless optimism was key to the recovery.

=== Brexit and United Ireland ===
Enda Kenny's insistence on the inclusion of a united Ireland clause in the Brexit negotiations could leave a lasting impact on the island of Ireland. Political Editor Daniel McConnell argues that the specific mention of Irish unity, known as 'the Kenny text' in the Brexit talks agenda, was Kenny's crowning achievement. The text spelt out that in the event of a future unity referendum in Ireland, as envisaged by the Good Friday Agreement, Northern Ireland would automatically rejoin the European Union.

=== Progressive social reforms ===
Kenny and his government were surprisingly progressive on social issues. Kenny had canvassed for a divorce referendum "as far back as 1986, which was hard for a rural politician". Kenny's stinging reprimand of the Vatican was the first of its kind and separated church and state in Ireland to its largest degree at that time. That speech "astonished" people. He showed "considerable skill" in his apology to the victims of the Magdalene laundries which was "very well judged and very well received". This led to the creation of a compensation scheme that by March 2022, has paid out a total of €32.8 million by the State, in awards of up to €100,000, to 814 survivors.

He was "quite vocal" about same sex marriage and went "straight for it", passing legislation by referendum in 2015 that stated "Marriage may be contracted in accordance with law by two persons without distinction as to their sex."

As Taoiseach, he "faced down traditionalists and legislated for a restricted form of abortion to be made legal", where none previously existed in Ireland. Political biographer John Downing said Kenny "skillfuly legislated for this, which had been ignored in Ireland for 20 years. Everyone kicked to touch on it but he took it on".

=== Contributions to Democracy in Ireland ===
By delivering on a pre-election promise, Kenny's government created Ireland's first Citizens' assembly in 2016.

Since then, Irish citizens' assemblies have made important contributions on issues like population aging, climate change and gay marriage.

Ireland is seen as a leading light in the world of citizens' assemblies and Irish citizens belong to "the most innovative democracy in Europe", according to political commentator David Van Reybrouck, the Flemish Belgian author of 'Against Elections: The Case for Democracy'. In an open letter featured in several European newspapers, Mr. Reybrouck said "Look at Ireland, the most innovative democracy in Europe. A few weeks ago, a random sample of one hundred Irish citizens, drafted by lot, was brought together into a Citizens' Assembly. This is a country that trusts its citizens, instead of fearing them."

He showed "skill and experience" in being able to put together a minority coalition in 2016 and "established a more cooperative model of coalition politics".

=== Europe and International ===
Kenny has always been better received internationally, particularly in the United States and Europe, than at home. He "assiduously attended" the EPP leader summits where he established good, long-term relationships with many counter parts like David Cameron and Angela Merkel. This proved to be enormously valuable when Kenny was negotiating better terms for Ireland in the wake the financial crisis, and allowed him to withstand being "ganged up on by other leaders over Ireland's low corporate tax rate" at his first summit as Taoiseach.

"He reestablished Ireland's reputation internationally.

=== John Downing Biography ===
Political journalist John Downing wrote a biography of Kenny titled Enda Kenny: The Unlikely Taoiseach. Downing has said Kenny "refused cooperation for the book on two grounds". Firstly, "he wasn't sure he was a subject worthy of a biography, which shows his modesty". Secondly, Downing said Kenny told him "Look, this is a job I do. When I do it and leave it, it'll be done and that's the end of it" which, to Downing, "shows some character to be able to move into the background and focus on local and families".

According to Downing, "every dog and devil has his phone number but he doesn't talk about politics anymore. He's kind of gracefully left the stage".

Kenny is "certainly in the Top 5 Taoisigh of all time". He is "confident on that".

== Public image ==
In July 2011, four months after becoming Taoiseach, Kenny's approval rating was 53%, a huge increase from his predecessor Brian Cowen's 10% when he left office. However, like Cowen, Kenny's ratings declined. It went to 51–52% before falling to 44% then to 36% in 2012. Then his ratings fell to 30% before rising to 34% before falling to its low point of 20% when 2014 ended. However, unlike Cowen, Kenny's approval ratings improved after that point rising to 28% then to 31% before hovering around 30–33% before rising to 36% and then eventually leaving office with a 44% approval.

== Personal life ==
Enda Kenny has been described as "popular, avuncular and good humoured", "sincere and genuine" and "relentlessly positive".

Kenny has been married to Fionnuala O'Kelly since 1992. She has been described by the media as his "secret weapon". O'Kelly is a first cousin to sitting Fine Gael MEP Seán Kelly, who also served as a president of the Gaelic Athletic Association (GAA). The O'Kelly family originally come from the parish of Kilcummin near Killarney, County Kerry. The couple have three children: one daughter, Aoibhinn, and two sons, Ferdia and Naoise. The couple met in Leinster House, where O'Kelly worked as a press officer for Fianna Fáil. She later worked with Raidió Teilifís Éireann (RTÉ).

Enda Kenny is a keen Gaeilgeoir and was quite a gifted athlete. He did not drink alcohol until his mid twenties. He has been described as "Ireland's fittest Taoiseach" with his biggest competition for the title coming in the form of Jack Lynch, who served as Taoiseach between 1966 and 1973 and played both hurling and Gaelic football for Cork at inter-county level.

Kenny has climbed Mount Kilimanjaro, finished multiple 100 km Pink Ribbon cycles to raise funds for Breast Cancer and has completed the 180 km Ring of Kerry Charity Cycle multiple times. He is a keen supporter of his native Mayo GAA football team, and played football for his local club, Islandeady GAA, of which he is the current club president. His father Henry, won an All-Ireland medal with the county team in 1936. His grandfather was a lighthouse keeper.

In February 2023, a spokesperson for Kenny announced he had been diagnosed with cancer. Kenny had undergone a medical procedure to treat the cancer and was expected to make a full recovery.

== See also ==
- Families in the Oireachtas

Honorary titles
Preceded by Máire Geoghegan-Quinn	Baby of the Dáil; 1975–1977	Succeeded by Síle de Valera
Preceded by Séamus Pattison	Father of the Dáil; 2007–2020	Succeeded by Richard Bruton and Willie O'Dea
Political offices
Preceded by George Birmingham	Minister of State at the Department of Education; 1986–1987	Succeeded by Frank Fahey
Preceded by Charlie McCreevy	Minister for Tourism and Trade; 1994–1997	Succeeded by Jim McDaid as Minister for Tourism, Sport and Recreation
Preceded by Michael Noonan	Leader of the Opposition; 2002–2011	Succeeded by Micheál Martin
Preceded by Brian Cowen	Taoiseach; 2011–2017	Succeeded by Leo Varadkar
Preceded by Alan Shatter	Minister for Defence; Acting; 2014	Succeeded by Simon Coveney
Preceded by Simon Coveney	Minister for Defence; 2016–2017	Succeeded by Leo Varadkar
Party political offices
Preceded by Michael Noonan	Leader of Fine Gael; 2002–2017	Succeeded by Leo Varadkar

Dáil	Election	Deputy (Party)	Deputy (Party)	Deputy (Party)
19th	1969	Mícheál Ó Móráin (FF)	Joseph Lenehan (FF)	Henry Kenny (FG)
20th	1973	Denis Gallagher (FF)	Myles Staunton (FG)	Henry Kenny (FG)
20th	1975 by-election	Denis Gallagher (FF)	Myles Staunton (FG)	Enda Kenny (FG)
21st	1977	Denis Gallagher (FF)	Pádraig Flynn (FF)	Enda Kenny (FG)
22nd	1981	Denis Gallagher (FF)	Pádraig Flynn (FF)	Enda Kenny (FG)
23rd	1982 (Feb)	Denis Gallagher (FF)	Pádraig Flynn (FF)	Enda Kenny (FG)
24th	1982 (Nov)	Denis Gallagher (FF)	Pádraig Flynn (FF)	Enda Kenny (FG)
25th	1987	Denis Gallagher (FF)	Pádraig Flynn (FF)	Enda Kenny (FG)
26th	1989	Martin O'Toole (FF)	Pádraig Flynn (FF)	Enda Kenny (FG)
27th	1992	Séamus Hughes (FF)	Pádraig Flynn (FF)	Enda Kenny (FG)
27th	1994 by-election	Séamus Hughes (FF)	Michael Ring (FG)	Enda Kenny (FG)
28th	1997	Constituency abolished. See Mayo		

Dáil	Election	Deputy (Party)	Deputy (Party)	Deputy (Party)	Deputy (Party)	Deputy (Party)
28th	1997	Beverley Flynn (FF)	Tom Moffatt (FF)	Enda Kenny (FG)	Michael Ring (FG)	Jim Higgins (FG)
29th	2002	Beverley Flynn (FF)	John Carty (FF)	Enda Kenny (FG)	Michael Ring (FG)	Jerry Cowley (Ind.)
30th	2007	Beverley Flynn (Ind.)	Dara Calleary (FF)	Enda Kenny (FG)	Michael Ring (FG)	John O'Mahony (FG)
31st	2011	Michelle Mulherin (FG)	Dara Calleary (FF)	Enda Kenny (FG)	Michael Ring (FG)	John O'Mahony (FG)
32nd	2016	Lisa Chambers (FF)	Dara Calleary (FF)	Enda Kenny (FG)	Michael Ring (FG)	4 seats 2016–2024
33rd	2020	Rose Conway-Walsh (SF)	Dara Calleary (FF)	Alan Dillon (FG)	Michael Ring (FG)	4 seats 2016–2024
34th	2024	Rose Conway-Walsh (SF)	Dara Calleary (FF)	Alan Dillon (FG)	Keira Keogh (FG)	Paul Lawless (Aon)
