= Myles Staunton =

Irish politician (1935–2011)

Senator
- In office 1 November 1989 – 1 June 1993
- Constituency: Industrial and Commercial Panel
- In office 27 October 1977 – 13 May 1982
- Constituency: Administrative Panel

Teachta Dála
- In office February 1973 – June 1977
- Constituency: Mayo West

Personal details
- Born: 24 September 1935 County Mayo, Ireland
- Died: 22 June 2011 (aged 75) County Mayo, Ireland
- Party: Fine Gael

Myles Staunton (24 September 1935 – 22 June 2011) was an Irish Fine Gael politician and businessman from Westport, County Mayo.

He first stood for election at the 1969 general election for the Mayo West constituency but was unsuccessful. He was elected to Dáil Éireann as a Fine Gael Teachta Dála (TD) for Mayo West at the 1973 general election. He lost his Dáil seat at the 1977 general election but was elected to the 14th Seanad on the Administrative Panel. He stood unsuccessfully as the Fine Gael candidate at the 1979 European election for the Connacht–Ulster constituency. He was re-elected to the 15th Seanad in 1981.

He stood again for the Dáil at the 1989 general election but was not elected. He was elected to the 19th Seanad on the Industrial and Commercial Panel in 1989.

He died on 22 June 2011, aged 75.

Dáil	Election	Deputy (Party)	Deputy (Party)	Deputy (Party)
19th	1969	Mícheál Ó Móráin (FF)	Joseph Lenehan (FF)	Henry Kenny (FG)
20th	1973	Denis Gallagher (FF)	Myles Staunton (FG)	Henry Kenny (FG)
20th	1975 by-election	Denis Gallagher (FF)	Myles Staunton (FG)	Enda Kenny (FG)
21st	1977	Denis Gallagher (FF)	Pádraig Flynn (FF)	Enda Kenny (FG)
22nd	1981	Denis Gallagher (FF)	Pádraig Flynn (FF)	Enda Kenny (FG)
23rd	1982 (Feb)	Denis Gallagher (FF)	Pádraig Flynn (FF)	Enda Kenny (FG)
24th	1982 (Nov)	Denis Gallagher (FF)	Pádraig Flynn (FF)	Enda Kenny (FG)
25th	1987	Denis Gallagher (FF)	Pádraig Flynn (FF)	Enda Kenny (FG)
26th	1989	Martin O'Toole (FF)	Pádraig Flynn (FF)	Enda Kenny (FG)
27th	1992	Séamus Hughes (FF)	Pádraig Flynn (FF)	Enda Kenny (FG)
27th	1994 by-election	Séamus Hughes (FF)	Michael Ring (FG)	Enda Kenny (FG)
28th	1997	Constituency abolished. See Mayo		
