= Mary Coughlan =

Mary Coughlan may refer to:

- Mary Coughlan (politician) (born 1965), former Irish Fianna Fáil politician
- Mary Coughlan (singer) (born 1956), Irish singer
