= Henry Kenny =

Irish politician (1913–1975)

Parliamentary Secretary
- 1973–1975: Finance

Teachta Dála
- In office June 1969 – 25 September 1975
- Constituency: Mayo West
- In office June 1954 – June 1969
- Constituency: Mayo South

Personal details
- Born: 7 September 1913 Castlebar, County Mayo, Ireland
- Died: 25 September 1975 (aged 62) Swinford, County Mayo, Ireland
- Party: Fine Gael
- Spouse: Eithne McGinley (m. 1944)
- Children: 5, including Enda
- Education: St Patrick's College, Dublin

Henry Frances Kenny (7 September 1913 – 25 September 1975) was an Irish Fine Gael politician who served as Minister of State at the Department of Finance from 1973 to 1975. He served as a Teachta Dála (TD) from 1954 to 1975. He was the father of former Taoiseach Enda Kenny.

He was also a Gaelic footballer who won an All-Ireland Senior Football Championship medal with the Mayo county team in 1936.

== Early life ==
Kenny was born on Main Street, Castlebar, County Mayo, in 1913. He was educated at the local St Patrick's national school and St Gerald's College. He subsequently attended St Patrick's College in Drumcondra, Dublin, where he qualified as a national school teacher. After graduation he taught in Connemara and Williamstown, County Galway, before being appointed principal of Leitir national school in Islandeady, County Mayo.

== Football career ==
=== Club ===
He played his club Gaelic football with Castlebar Mitchels club, and won several county senior championship medals in the 1930s.

=== Inter-county ===
Kenny's performances at club level earned him a place on the senior Mayo county team. He was a member of the record-breaking Mayo team that won six consecutive National Football League titles from 1934 until 1939. Kenny also won an All-Ireland winners' medal in 1936.

== Political career ==
His entry into politics was unusual in the sense that neither he nor his family were steeped in politics at the time. In spite of this he was elected to Dáil Éireann at his first attempt, at the 1954 general election, as a Fine Gael Teachta Dála (TD) for the Mayo South constituency. The election saw Fine Gael enter government as the lead party in the country's second inter-party government. Kenny, as a new TD, remained on the backbenches; however, he was subsequently elected to Mayo County Council.

Kenny retained his seat at the 1957 general election; however, Fine Gael lost power as Fianna Fáil began sixteen years of uninterrupted government. During that time he retained his Dáil seat at every general election, moving to the Mayo West constituency in 1969. That same year he was appointed Fine Gael spokesperson on the Board of Works, a position he held until 1972. The results of the 1973 general election saw Fine Gael and the Labour Party form a coalition government. Kenny was appointed Parliamentary Secretary to the Minister for Finance where he had responsibility for the Board of Works.

== Death and private life ==
Two years after being appointed to the government, Kenny was diagnosed with cancer. He died on 25 September 1975. He married Eithne McGinley in 1944 and they had five children. His son, Enda Kenny, was elected to the Dáil at the by-election in 1975. Another son, also Henry Kenny, was a member of Mayo County Council from 1999 to 2019. His widow Eithne Kenny died at the age of 93 in Castlebar on 26 November 2011.

== See also ==
- Families in the Oireachtas

Political offices
Preceded by Noel Lemass	Parliamentary Secretary to the Minister for Finance; 1973–1975	Succeeded by Michael Begley

Dáil	Election	Deputy (Party)	Deputy (Party)	Deputy (Party)	Deputy (Party)	Deputy (Party)
4th	1923	Tom Maguire (Rep)	Michael Kilroy (Rep)	William Sears (CnaG)	Joseph MacBride (CnaG)	Martin Nally (CnaG)
5th	1927 (Jun)	Thomas J. O'Connell (Lab)	Michael Kilroy (FF)	Eugene Mullen (FF)	James FitzGerald-Kenney (CnaG)	Martin Nally (CnaG)
6th	1927 (Sep)	Thomas J. O'Connell (Lab)	Michael Kilroy (FF)	Richard Walsh (FF)	James FitzGerald-Kenney (CnaG)	Martin Nally (CnaG)
7th	1932	Edward Moane (FF)	Michael Kilroy (FF)	Richard Walsh (FF)	James FitzGerald-Kenney (CnaG)	Martin Nally (CnaG)
8th	1933	Edward Moane (FF)	Michael Kilroy (FF)	Richard Walsh (FF)	James FitzGerald-Kenney (CnaG)	Martin Nally (CnaG)
9th	1937	Edward Moane (FF)	Micheál Clery (FF)	Richard Walsh (FF)	James FitzGerald-Kenney (FG)	Martin Nally (FG)
10th	1938	Mícheál Ó Móráin (FF)	Micheál Clery (FF)	Richard Walsh (FF)	James FitzGerald-Kenney (FG)	Martin Nally (FG)
11th	1943	Mícheál Ó Móráin (FF)	Micheál Clery (FF)	Joseph Blowick (CnaT)	James FitzGerald-Kenney (FG)	Dominick Cafferky (CnaT)
12th	1944	Mícheál Ó Móráin (FF)	Micheál Clery (FF)	Joseph Blowick (CnaT)	Richard Walsh (FF)	Dominick Cafferky (CnaT)
12th	1945 by-election	Mícheál Ó Móráin (FF)	Bernard Commons (CnaT)	Joseph Blowick (CnaT)	Richard Walsh (FF)	Dominick Cafferky (CnaT)
13th	1948	Mícheál Ó Móráin (FF)	Bernard Commons (CnaT)	Joseph Blowick (CnaT)	Richard Walsh (FF)	4 seats 1948–1969
14th	1951	Mícheál Ó Móráin (FF)	Seán Flanagan (FF)	Joseph Blowick (CnaT)	Dominick Cafferky (CnaT)	4 seats 1948–1969
15th	1954	Mícheál Ó Móráin (FF)	Seán Flanagan (FF)	Joseph Blowick (CnaT)	Henry Kenny (FG)	4 seats 1948–1969
16th	1957	Mícheál Ó Móráin (FF)	Seán Flanagan (FF)	Joseph Blowick (CnaT)	Henry Kenny (FG)	4 seats 1948–1969
17th	1961	Mícheál Ó Móráin (FF)	Seán Flanagan (FF)	Joseph Blowick (CnaT)	Henry Kenny (FG)	4 seats 1948–1969
18th	1965	Mícheál Ó Móráin (FF)	Seán Flanagan (FF)	Michael Lyons (FG)	Henry Kenny (FG)	4 seats 1948–1969
19th	1969	Constituency abolished. See Mayo East and Mayo West				

Dáil	Election	Deputy (Party)	Deputy (Party)	Deputy (Party)
19th	1969	Mícheál Ó Móráin (FF)	Joseph Lenehan (FF)	Henry Kenny (FG)
20th	1973	Denis Gallagher (FF)	Myles Staunton (FG)	Henry Kenny (FG)
20th	1975 by-election	Denis Gallagher (FF)	Myles Staunton (FG)	Enda Kenny (FG)
21st	1977	Denis Gallagher (FF)	Pádraig Flynn (FF)	Enda Kenny (FG)
22nd	1981	Denis Gallagher (FF)	Pádraig Flynn (FF)	Enda Kenny (FG)
23rd	1982 (Feb)	Denis Gallagher (FF)	Pádraig Flynn (FF)	Enda Kenny (FG)
24th	1982 (Nov)	Denis Gallagher (FF)	Pádraig Flynn (FF)	Enda Kenny (FG)
25th	1987	Denis Gallagher (FF)	Pádraig Flynn (FF)	Enda Kenny (FG)
26th	1989	Martin O'Toole (FF)	Pádraig Flynn (FF)	Enda Kenny (FG)
27th	1992	Séamus Hughes (FF)	Pádraig Flynn (FF)	Enda Kenny (FG)
27th	1994 by-election	Séamus Hughes (FF)	Michael Ring (FG)	Enda Kenny (FG)
28th	1997	Constituency abolished. See Mayo		
