= 19th Dáil =

TDs from 1969 to 1973

←	18th Dáil	20th Dáil	→

Overview
- Legislative body: Dáil Éireann
- Jurisdiction: Ireland
- Meeting place: Leinster House
- Term: 2 July 1969 – 5 February 1973
- Election: 1969 general election
- Government: 13th government of Ireland
- Members: 144
- Ceann Comhairle: Cormac Breslin
- Taoiseach: Jack Lynch
- Tánaiste: Erskine H. Childers
- Chief Whip: David Andrews — Desmond O'Malley until 7 May 1970
- Leader of the Opposition: Liam Cosgrave

Sessions
- 1st: 2 July 1969 – 23 July 1969
- 2nd: 22 October 1969 – 30 July 1970
- 3rd: 28 October 1970 – 6 August 1971
- 4th: 20 October 1971 – 14 July 1972
- 5th: 25 October 1972 – 14 December 1972

The 19th Dáil was elected at the 1969 general election on 18 June 1969 and met on 2 July 1969. The members of Dáil Éireann, the house of representatives of the Oireachtas (legislature) of Ireland, are known as TDs. It sat with the 12th Seanad as the two Houses of the Oireachtas.

On 5 February 1973, President Éamon de Valera dissolved the Dáil on the request of Taoiseach Jack Lynch. The 19th Dáil lasted 3 years, 218 days.

== Composition of the 19th Dáil ==
- 13th government

Party	June 1969	Feb. 1973	Change
Fianna Fáil	75	70	▼5
Fine Gael	50	50	Steady
Labour	18	17	▼1
Aontacht Éireann	—N/a	1	▲1
Independent	1	3	▲2
Ceann Comhairle	—N/a	1	▲1
Vacant	—N/a	2	▲2
Total	144		

Fianna Fáil formed the 13th government of Ireland led by Jack Lynch as Taoiseach.

=== Graphical representation ===
This is a graphical comparison of party strengths in the 19th Dáil from July 1969. This was not the official seating plan.

== Ceann Comhairle ==
On the meeting of the Dáil, Cormac Breslin (FF), who had served as Ceann Comhairle from November 1967, was proposed by Jack Lynch (FF) and seconded by Liam Cosgrave (FG) for the position. His election was approved without a vote.

== TDs by constituency ==
The list of the 144 TDs elected is given in alphabetical order by Dáil constituency.

Members of the 19th Dáil
Constituency	Name	Party
Carlow–Kilkenny	Kieran Crotty	Fine Gael
Carlow–Kilkenny	Jim Gibbons	Fianna Fáil
Carlow–Kilkenny	Desmond Governey	Fine Gael
Carlow–Kilkenny	Tom Nolan	Fianna Fáil
Carlow–Kilkenny	Séamus Pattison	Labour
Cavan	Tom Fitzpatrick	Fine Gael
Cavan	Patrick O'Reilly	Fine Gael
Cavan	Paddy Smith	Fianna Fáil
Clare	Sylvester Barrett	Fianna Fáil
Clare	Patrick Hillery	Fianna Fáil
Clare	Frank Taylor	Fine Gael
Clare–South Galway	Michael Carty	Fianna Fáil
Clare–South Galway	Brigid Hogan-O'Higgins	Fine Gael
Clare–South Galway	Bill Loughnane	Fianna Fáil
Cork City North-West	Liam Burke	Fine Gael
Cork City North-West	Seán French	Fianna Fáil
Cork City North-West	Jack Lynch	Fianna Fáil
Cork City South-East	Peter Barry	Fine Gael
Cork City South-East	Gus Healy	Fianna Fáil
Cork City South-East	Pearse Wyse	Fianna Fáil
Cork Mid	Philip Burton	Fine Gael
Cork Mid	Donal Creed	Fine Gael
Cork Mid	Paddy Forde	Fianna Fáil
Cork Mid	Thomas Meaney	Fianna Fáil
Cork North-East	Richard Barry	Fine Gael
Cork North-East	Seán Brosnan	Fianna Fáil
Cork North-East	Gerard Cott	Fine Gael
Cork North-East	Jerry Cronin	Fianna Fáil
Cork South-West	Flor Crowley	Fianna Fáil
Cork South-West	Michael Pat Murphy	Labour
Cork South-West	John O'Sullivan	Fine Gael
Donegal–Leitrim	Joseph Brennan	Fianna Fáil
Donegal–Leitrim	Cormac Breslin	Fianna Fáil
Donegal–Leitrim	Patrick O'Donnell	Fine Gael
Donegal North-East	Neil Blaney	Fianna Fáil
Donegal North-East	Liam Cunningham	Fianna Fáil
Donegal North-East	Paddy Harte	Fine Gael
Dublin Central	Frank Cluskey	Labour
Dublin Central	Vivion de Valera	Fianna Fáil
Dublin Central	Maurice E. Dockrell	Fine Gael
Dublin Central	Tom Fitzpatrick	Fianna Fáil
Dublin County North	Patrick Burke	Fianna Fáil
Dublin County North	Mark Clinton	Fine Gael
Dublin County North	Des Foley	Fianna Fáil
Dublin County North	Justin Keating	Labour
Dublin County South	Kevin Boland	Fianna Fáil
Dublin County South	Richard Burke	Fine Gael
Dublin County South	Tom O'Higgins	Fine Gael
Dublin North-Central	Luke Belton	Fine Gael
Dublin North-Central	George Colley	Fianna Fáil
Dublin North-Central	Celia Lynch	Fianna Fáil
Dublin North-Central	Michael O'Leary	Labour
Dublin North-East	Paddy Belton	Fine Gael
Dublin North-East	Charles Haughey	Fianna Fáil
Dublin North-East	Conor Cruise O'Brien	Labour
Dublin North-East	Eugene Timmons	Fianna Fáil
Dublin North-West	Hugh Byrne	Fine Gael
Dublin North-West	Richard Gogan	Fianna Fáil
Dublin North-West	David Thornley	Labour
Dublin North-West	Jim Tunney	Fianna Fáil
Dublin South-Central	Philip Brady	Fianna Fáil
Dublin South-Central	Ben Briscoe	Fianna Fáil
Dublin South-Central	John O'Donovan	Labour
Dublin South-Central	Richie Ryan	Fine Gael
Dublin South-East	Noël Browne	Labour
Dublin South-East	Garret FitzGerald	Fine Gael
Dublin South-East	Seán Moore	Fianna Fáil
Dublin South-West	Joseph Dowling	Fianna Fáil
Dublin South-West	Seán Dunne	Labour
Dublin South-West	Noel Lemass	Fianna Fáil
Dublin South-West	John O'Connell	Labour
Dún Laoghaire and Rathdown	David Andrews	Fianna Fáil
Dún Laoghaire and Rathdown	Liam Cosgrave	Fine Gael
Dún Laoghaire and Rathdown	Barry Desmond	Labour
Dún Laoghaire and Rathdown	H. Percy Dockrell	Fine Gael
Galway North-East	John Donnellan	Fine Gael
Galway North-East	Thomas Hussey	Fianna Fáil
Galway North-East	Michael F. Kitt	Fianna Fáil
Galway West	Fintan Coogan Snr	Fine Gael
Galway West	Johnny Geoghegan	Fianna Fáil
Galway West	Bobby Molloy	Fianna Fáil
Kerry North	Gerard Lynch	Fine Gael
Kerry North	Tom McEllistrim	Fianna Fáil
Kerry North	Dan Spring	Labour
Kerry South	Michael Begley	Fine Gael
Kerry South	Timothy O'Connor	Fianna Fáil
Kerry South	John O'Leary	Fianna Fáil
Kildare	Terence Boylan	Fianna Fáil
Kildare	Paddy Power	Fianna Fáil
Kildare	Gerard Sweetman	Fine Gael
Laois–Offaly	Ger Connolly	Fianna Fáil
Laois–Offaly	Bernard Cowen	Fianna Fáil
Laois–Offaly	Tom Enright	Fine Gael
Laois–Offaly	Oliver J. Flanagan	Fine Gael
Laois–Offaly	Patrick Lalor	Fianna Fáil
Limerick East	Stephen Coughlan	Labour
Limerick East	Michael Herbert	Fianna Fáil
Limerick East	Tom O'Donnell	Fine Gael
Limerick East	Desmond O'Malley	Fianna Fáil
Limerick West	Gerry Collins	Fianna Fáil
Limerick West	Michael J. Noonan	Fianna Fáil
Limerick West	Denis Jones	Fine Gael
Longford–Westmeath	Frank Carter	Fianna Fáil
Longford–Westmeath	Patrick Lenihan	Fianna Fáil
Longford–Westmeath	Gerry L'Estrange	Fine Gael
Longford–Westmeath	Joe Sheridan	Independent
Louth	Frank Aiken	Fianna Fáil
Louth	Paddy Donegan	Fine Gael
Louth	Pádraig Faulkner	Fianna Fáil
Mayo East	Martin Finn	Fine Gael
Mayo East	Seán Flanagan	Fianna Fáil
Mayo East	Thomas O'Hara	Fine Gael
Mayo West	Henry Kenny	Fine Gael
Mayo West	Joseph Lenehan	Fianna Fáil
Mayo West	Mícheál Ó Móráin	Fianna Fáil
Meath	John Bruton	Fine Gael
Meath	Michael Hilliard	Fianna Fáil
Meath	James Tully	Labour
Monaghan	Erskine H. Childers	Fianna Fáil
Monaghan	John Conlan	Fine Gael
Monaghan	Billy Fox	Fine Gael
Roscommon–Leitrim	Joan Burke	Fine Gael
Roscommon–Leitrim	Hugh Gibbons	Fianna Fáil
Roscommon–Leitrim	Brian Lenihan	Fianna Fáil
Sligo–Leitrim	James Gallagher	Fianna Fáil
Sligo–Leitrim	Joseph McLoughlin	Fine Gael
Sligo–Leitrim	Ray MacSharry	Fianna Fáil
Tipperary North	Thomas Dunne	Fine Gael
Tipperary North	Michael O'Kennedy	Fianna Fáil
Tipperary North	Michael Smith	Fianna Fáil
Tipperary South	Noel Davern	Fianna Fáil
Tipperary South	Jackie Fahey	Fianna Fáil
Tipperary South	Patrick Hogan	Fine Gael
Tipperary South	Seán Treacy	Labour
Waterford	Fad Browne	Fianna Fáil
Waterford	Edward Collins	Fine Gael
Waterford	Billy Kenneally	Fianna Fáil
Wexford	Lorcan Allen	Fianna Fáil
Wexford	Seán Browne	Fianna Fáil
Wexford	Brendan Corish	Labour
Wexford	Anthony Esmonde	Fine Gael
Wicklow	Paudge Brennan	Fianna Fáil
Wicklow	Liam Kavanagh	Labour
Wicklow	Godfrey Timmins	Fine Gael

== Changes ==
Date	Constituency	Loss	Gain	Note
25 June 1969	Dublin South-West	Labour		Death of Seán Dunne
2 July 1969	Donegal–Leitrim	Fianna Fáil	Ceann Comhairle	Cormac Breslin takes office as Ceann Comhairle
28 January 1970	Kildare	Fine Gael		Death of Gerard Sweetman
4 March 1970	Dublin South-West		Fianna Fáil	Seán Sherwin wins seat vacated by the death of Seán Dunne
11 March 1970	Longford–Westmeath	Fianna Fáil		Death of Patrick Lenihan
14 April 1970	Kildare		Fine Gael	Patrick Malone holds seat vacated by the death of Sweetman
14 April 1970	Longford–Westmeath		Fine Gael	Patrick Cooney wins seat vacated by the death of Lenihan
4 October 1970	Donegal–Leitrim	Fine Gael		Death of Patrick O'Donnell
4 November 1970	Dublin County South	Fianna Fáil		Resignation of Kevin Boland
2 December 1970	Donegal–Leitrim		Fianna Fáil	Patrick Delap wins seat vacated by the death of O'Donnell
2 December 1970	Dublin County South		Fine Gael	Larry McMahon wins seat vacated by the resignation of Boland
19 September 1971	Dublin South-West	Fianna Fáil	Aontacht Éireann	Seán Sherwin joins new party
17 November 1971	Donegal North-East	Fianna Fáil	Independent	Neil Blaney expelled from Fianna Fáil parliamentary party
17 November 1971	Wicklow	Fianna Fáil	Independent	Paudge Brennan expelled from Fianna Fáil parliamentary party
13 May 1972	Cork Mid	Fianna Fáil		Death of Paddy Forde
2 August 1972	Cork Mid		Fianna Fáil	Gene Fitzgerald holds seat vacated by the death of Forde
5 October 1972	Tipperary South	Fine Gael		Death of Patrick Hogan
6 January 1973	Clare	Fianna Fáil		Resignation of Patrick Hillery on appointment as European Commissioner
