= Dublin South County =

Dublin South County may refer to:

- South Dublin county, created in 1994
- Dublin County South Dáil constituency (1969–1981)
