= 1972 Cork Mid by-election =

By-election to the 19th Dáil

- 2 August 1972
- Turnout: 39,962 (80.9%)
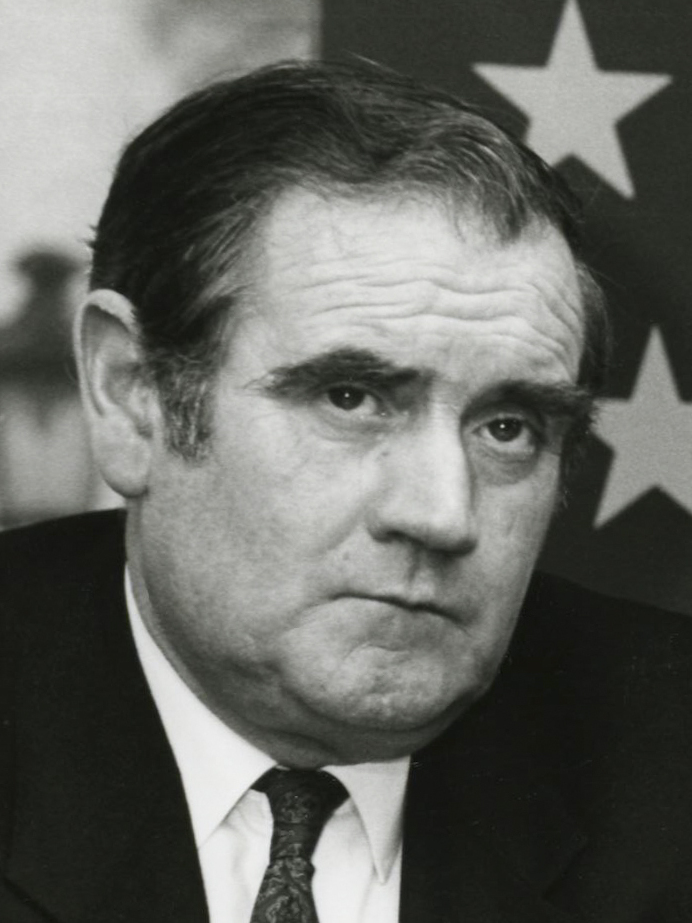

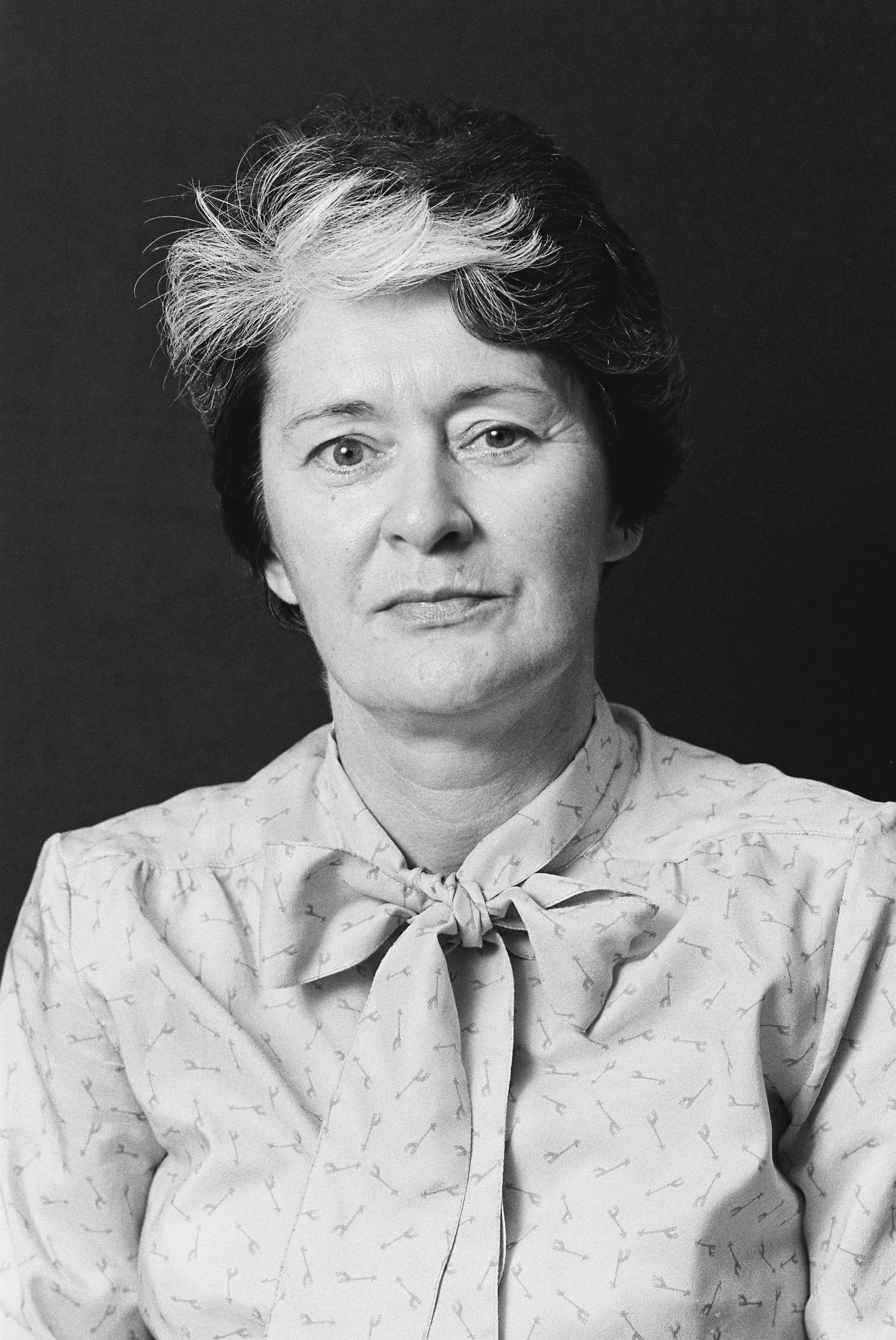
		O'Sullivan
Nominee	Gene Fitzgerald	Denis J. O'Sullivan	Eileen Desmond
Party	Fianna Fáil	Fine Gael	Labour
First preferences	19,959	12,530	6,301
Percentage	49.5%	31.6%	15.9%
Final count	20,214	12,788	6,711
TD before election
Paddy Forde
Fianna Fáil
TD after election
Gene Fitzgerald
Fianna Fáil

A Dáil by-election was held in the constituency of Cork Mid in Ireland on Wednesday, 2 August 1972, to fill a vacancy in the 19th Dáil. It followed the death of Fianna Fáil Teachta Dála (TD) Paddy Forde on 13 May 1972.

The writ of election to fill the vacancy was agreed by the Dáil on 12 July 1972.

The by-election was won by the Fianna Fáil candidate Gene Fitzgerald.

== Result ==
1972 Cork Mid by-election
Party	Candidate	FPv%	Count	
Party	Candidate	FPv%	1	2
Fianna Fáil	Gene Fitzgerald	49.5	19,959	20,214
Fine Gael	Denis J. O'Sullivan	31.6	12,530	12,788
Labour	Eileen Desmond	15.9	6,301	6,711
Aontacht Éireann	Paddy O'Callaghan	3.0	1,172	
Electorate: 49,402 Valid: 39,962 Quota: 19,982 Turnout: 80.9%
