= Paddy Forde =

Irish politician (1922–1972)

Teachta Dála
- In office June 1969 – 13 May 1972
- Constituency: Cork Mid

Personal details
- Born: 22 July 1922 County Cork, Ireland
- Died: 13 May 1972 (aged 49) County Cork, Ireland
- Party: Fianna Fáil

Patrick Forde (22 July 1922 – 13 May 1972) was an Irish Fianna Fáil politician. Forde stood unsuccessfully for election at the 1965 general election. He was elected to Dáil Éireann as a Fianna Fáil Teachta Dála (TD) at the 1969 general election for the Cork Mid constituency.

He died in 1972 during the 19th Dáil, a by-election was held on 2 August 1972 which was won by Gene Fitzgerald of Fianna Fáil.

Dáil	Election	Deputy (Party)	Deputy (Party)	Deputy (Party)	Deputy (Party)	Deputy (Party)
17th	1961	Dan Desmond (Lab)	Seán McCarthy (FF)	Con Meaney (FF)	Denis J. O'Sullivan (FG)	4 seats 1961–1977
17th	1965 by-election	Eileen Desmond (Lab)	Seán McCarthy (FF)	Con Meaney (FF)	Denis J. O'Sullivan (FG)	4 seats 1961–1977
18th	1965	Eileen Desmond (Lab)	Flor Crowley (FF)	Thomas Meaney (FF)	Donal Creed (FG)	4 seats 1961–1977
19th	1969	Philip Burton (FG)	Paddy Forde (FF)	Thomas Meaney (FF)	Donal Creed (FG)	4 seats 1961–1977
19th	1972 by-election	Philip Burton (FG)	Gene Fitzgerald (FF)	Thomas Meaney (FF)	Donal Creed (FG)	4 seats 1961–1977
20th	1973	Eileen Desmond (Lab)	Gene Fitzgerald (FF)	Thomas Meaney (FF)	Donal Creed (FG)	4 seats 1961–1977
21st	1977	Eileen Desmond (Lab)	Gene Fitzgerald (FF)	Thomas Meaney (FF)	Donal Creed (FG)	Barry Cogan (FF)
22nd	1981	Constituency abolished. See Cork North-Central and Cork South-Central				
