= South County Dublin =

South County Dublin may refer to:

- South Dublin county, formerly part of County Dublin, created in 1994.
- Dublin County South Dáil constituency (1969–1981)
