= 1970 Dublin South-West by-election =

By-election to the 19th Dáil

- 4 March 1970
- Turnout: 23,287 (57.2%)
| | Sherwin | Merrigan | Corcoran |
| Nominee | Seán Sherwin | Matt Merrigan | Lauri Corcoran |
| Party | Fianna Fáil | Labour | Independent |
| First preferences | 7,678 | 5,004 | 4,481 |
| Percentage | 33.0% | 21.5% | 19.2% |
| Final count | 10,710 | 10,448 | – |
TD before election
Seán Dunne
Labour
TD after election
Seán Sherwin
Fianna Fáil

A Dáil by-election was held in the constituency of Dublin South-West in Ireland on Wednesday, 4 March 1970, to fill a vacancy in the 19th Dáil. It followed the death of Labour Teachta Dála (TD) Seán Dunne on 25 June 1969. He died before the first sitting of the 19th Dáil on 2 July 1969.

The writ of election to fill the vacancy was agreed by the Dáil on 11 February 1970.

The by-election was won by the Fianna Fáil candidate Seán Sherwin. The Labour candidate, Matt Merrigan, lost by 262 votes, after Seán Dunne's widow Cora, stood as an independent candidate.

At the 1973 general election, Sherwin stood as a Aontacht Éireann candidate. He was not re-elected and was never subsequently re-elected to the Dáil.

== Result ==
1970 Dublin South-West by-election
| Party | Candidate | FPv% | Count | | | |
| Party | Candidate | FPv% | 1 | 2 | 3 | 4 |
|---|---|---|---|---|---|---|
| Fianna Fáil | Seán Sherwin | 33.0 | 7,678 | 7,897 | 8,641 | 10,710 |
| Labour | Matt Merrigan | 21.5 | 5,004 | 5,963 | 7,336 | 10,448 |
| Independent | Lauri Corcoran | 19.2 | 4,481 | 4,891 | 6,690 | |
| Fine Gael | Jim Mitchell | 17.4 | 4,062 | 4,415 | | |
| Independent | Cora Dunne | 8.9 | 2,062 | | | |
Electorate: 40,690 Valid: 23,287 Quota: 11,644 Turnout: 57.2%
