= Cornelius Desmond =

Cornelius Desmond may refer to:

- Cornelius Desmond (American politician) (1893–1974))
- Cornelius Desmond (Irish politician) (1898–1974)
- Connie Desmond, American sportscaster
