= Matt Merrigan =

Irish trade unionist (1922–2000)

Matthew Merrigan
- Merrigan in 1986
- Born: 1922; Dolphin's Barn, Dublin
- Died: 15 June 2000 (aged 78–79)
- Occupation: Trade Unionist
- Political party: Labour Party; Revolutionary Socialist Party; Socialist Labour Party

Matthew Merrigan (1922 – 15 June 2000) was an Irish socialist and trade unionist from Dublin, known for his catchphrase "Profits are wages that have not been distributed yet."

== Biography ==
=== Early life ===
Born in Dolphin's Barn, Dublin, Merrigan was the eighth of nine children of Matthew and Anne Merrigan. Merrigan grew up in poverty after the death of his father, an ITGWU card steward who died of tuberculosis. Just as many of his siblings had left education early to work, Merrigan left school at 13 as well, and when he was 15 he started to work in the Rowntree-Mackintosh chocolate factory, where he worked for the next 20 years.

He became an Amalgamated Transport and General Workers Union (ATGWU) shop steward in the 1930s. It was also during the 1930s he was engaged in raising support in Ireland for the Republicans in the Spanish Civil War. During the Emergency (World War II), he protested against Seán Lemass’s Wages Standstill Order of May 1941 had prevented trade unions from striking for higher wages by removing legal protection for strike action.

=== Becoming a Trotskyist ===
Merrigan joined the Irish Labour Party in 1942 and stood successfully as a Labour candidate in the 1942 Irish local elections, earning himself a seat on the Dublin Corporation. However, the presence of people such as Merrigan (and more significantly, figures such as James Larkin) as Labour members triggered a split in the party as certain sections believed that the party was being infiltrated by Communists. In response, William O'Brien and James Everett took a sizable portion of the Labour membership and split off to form the National Labour Party. The National Labour Party would contest the 1944 Irish general election and the 1948 Irish general election separately from Labour.

Merrigan for his part became involved in Trotskyist groups in Ireland. In 1942 he came into contact with Jim McClean and Bob Armstrong, members of the Belfast section of the Revolutionary Communist Party. Armstrong was a former member of the Communist Party of Great Britain and had fought in the Spanish Civil War. It was Armstrong's experience in Spain that had turned him against Stalinism. Influenced by McClean and Armstrong, Merrigan began to organise a branch in Dublin.

In 1944 both the Belfast and Dublin branches united together to form the Revolutionary Socialist Party. Despite only consisting of 20 members in all, the new group publicly announced themselves and resigned their memberships of the Labour Party. The RSP spent the late 1940s campaigning for a "united, secular, and republican Ireland" with a "wide degree of Protestant autonomy in Northern Ireland". Like so many other socialist parties, the RSP suggested a United Ireland could only be achieved if capitalism was overthrown. By the 1950s the RSP had petered out and Merrigan re-joined the Labour party.

=== Operating in the Labour Party ===
Influenced by the ideas of the American Trotskyist revisionist Max Shachtman, Merrigan wrote for the journal of Shachtman's International Socialist League into the 1950s. Investing himself in reading socialist theoretical literature, he attended both the People's College and the Review Group classes of John de Courcy Ireland, as well as attending a correspondence course with the British National Council of Labour Colleges.

Merrigan unsuccessfully contested the 1954 general election in Dublin South-West. He was the lowest placed of three Labour candidates in the constituency and lost his deposit.

He was expelled from Labour during the 1957 Irish general election for supporting independent candidate Noel Browne, but was re-admitted in 1964.

Merrigan became a full-time ATGWU official as Dublin branch secretary, which comprised about 4,000 members, forty per cent of total ATGWU membership in the Republic of Ireland. Between 1960 and 1986 he was ATGWU district secretary for the Republic of Ireland, and in that role he provided militant leadership, retaining popularity with his union's membership despite frequent conflict with moderate trade-union leaders.

After a prolonged absence from electoral politics, Merrigan stood again as a candidate in the Dublin South-West by-election in 1970. He narrowly missed holding the Labour-held seat due in part to the intervention of independent candidate Cora Dunne, widow of Sean Dunne, whose death had triggered the by-election. Merrigan's refusal to take any transfers from Fine Gael candidates was another factor in the tight race, particular as in that era Fine Gael and Labour were frequent coalition partners.

He was a member of Labour's administrative council but Merrigan resigned in 1970 when the body failed to expel Stephen Coughlan, TD for Limerick East, over anti-semitic remarks.

He opposed Labour's 1970 electoral pact with Fine Gael and their subsequent joint manifesto for the 1973 general election. Merrigan hated the idea of Labour going into coalition with the two main parties in Ireland, Fine Gael and Fianna Fáil, calling them unison of "irreconcilable class and social forces". He lambasted leaders in the Labour party in favour of coalitions as ‘wretched middle-class careerists’ eager for ‘a place in capitalism's squalor’. In 1972 he campaigned against Ireland joining the European Economic Community.

As chairman of the Liaison Committee of Labour Left (an internal pressure group) during Labour's period in government between 1973 and 1977, he sought to galvanise party militants behind radical policies.

Merrigan continuous and vociferous criticism of Labour resulted in him being expelled from the party in 1977.

=== Outside of the Labour Party ===
In 1977 he fought in the that year's general election on a joint manifesto with Noel Browne (also recently expelled from Labour), both running as "Independent Labour" candidates. Merrigan ran in Dublin Finglas, but was not elected. Browne was successful, however, and together they became co-founders of the new Socialist Labour Party, of which Merrigan became chairman. The new party was short-lived, and although Merrigan stood at two further Dáil elections, his share of the vote was tiny. The party suffered from internal squabbling over what their position on Northern Ireland and the Troubles should be. Merrigan believed that British Unionism and Socialism were two incompatible viewpoints, and campaigned for a British declaration of intent to withdraw from Northern Ireland. He also called for working-class leadership of the anti-partition struggle, rather than marching to the beat of the drum of Irish Nationalists.

He was president of the Irish Congress of Trade Unions in 1985. As a trade unionist, he opposed national wage agreements because in his mind they did nothing to improve the workers' share of national income. Merrigan was critical of the corporatist tendency of Irish industrial relations in contrast to the less malleable and more socialist ethos of British trade-unionism. He also felt that that successive Irish government favoured and supported Irish-only trade unions rather than amalgamated British-Irish ones in order to limit their power and effectiveness.

During the 1980s he supported protests against the PAYE tax system. Merrigan was an anti-militarist and was supportive of Irish neutrality. He criticised US policy on Cuba, Vietnam, and Central America, and also opposed repressive aspects of the communist systems of the USSR and Eastern Europe.

He also served as a member of the Employment Appeals Tribunal.

Merrigan died in hospital in Dublin on 15 June 2000, aged 78, after collapsing earlier that day at the ATGWU's conference in Malahide, County Dublin. His wife Rose had died some years before, but he was survived by their daughter and two sons—the elder of whom, also called Matt, is an official of the Services, Industrial, Professional and Technical Union (SIPTU).

== Bibliography ==
- "A socialist visionary and trade union pragmatist". The Irish Times. 17 June 2000.
- "Tom Kitt Pays Tribute to Matt Merrigan". Department of Enterprise, Trade and Employment. 2000.
- "Matthew Merrigan's electoral history". ElectionsIreland.org.

Trade union offices
Preceded by James Graham	President of the Irish Congress of Trade Unions; 1985	Succeeded by Jim McCusker
