= Seán Dunne (politician) =

Irish politician (1918–1969)

Teachta Dála
- In office October 1961 – 25 June 1969
- Constituency: Dublin South-West
- In office February 1948 – March 1957
- Constituency: Dublin County

Personal details
- Born: 18 December 1918 Waterford, Ireland
- Died: 25 June 1969 (aged 50) Dublin, Ireland
- Party: Labour Party
- Other political affiliations: Independent
- Spouse: Cora Ryan (m. 1956)

Seán Dunne (18 December 1918 – 25 June 1969) was an Irish trade union leader and Labour Party politician. He was a Teachta Dála (TD) from 1948 to 1957 and from 1961 to 1969.

== Early life ==
Dunne was born in Waterford, to Michael Dunne, an RIC constable, and Bridget Coppinger, a schoolteacher. On 10 May 1920, in an ambush at nearby Ahawadda, his father and two other constables were killed by Irish Volunteers in an ambush. Dunne subsequently grew up in his mother's native area of County Waterford.

At 16, he became involved in the Labour and Republican movements. He joined the Workers' Union of Ireland (WUI) in 1936 and led "hunger marches" in 1937. As a Republican, he was interned in the Curragh and Arbour Hill Prison for the first two years of the Second World War, rejoining the WUI on his release. In 1944, he became Secretary of the Agricultural Workers' section of the WUI. It was eventually decided that a separate union was required for agricultural workers and in May 1946 the Federation of Rural Workers was founded with Dunne as Organising Secretary, a post he held until 1954. Dunne organised many strikes among rural workers, and was instrumental in achieving the weekly half-day for members in the early 1950s.

== Political career ==
Dunne first stood for election to Dáil Éireann in the Dublin County constituency at the by-election held on 29 October 1947, as a Labour Party candidate, following the death of Fianna Fáil TD Patrick Fogarty. He finished last of the four candidates; the seat was won by Seán MacBride, leader of the new Clann na Poblachta party, who would become Minister for External Affairs in 1948.

At the 1948 general election, Dunne stood again in Dublin County, and won the third of the three seats. He was elected without reaching the quota and took his seat in the 13th Dáil.

He was re-elected at the 1951 general election and again at the 1954 general election, but did not contest the 1957 general election. He stood again in Dublin County at the 1961 election as an independent candidate, when he was returned to the 17th Dáil. He joined the Labour Party in 1963. He held his seat at the 1965 general election, this time as a Labour Party candidate. He constantly carried "Leabhar Ballyfermot", a notebook containing his constituents' problems. His frequent boast was: "If Dunne can't do it, it can't be done". He had the distinction of being ejected from two parliaments, Dáil Éireann and Stormont, as well as British Labour Party conferences. Seán MacEntee once labelled him "an extreme communist".

Dunne died aged 50 on 25 June 1969, only seven days after being returned at the 1969 general election for the Dublin South-West constituency, before he could sign the roll in the 19th Dáil. The by-election for his seat was held on 4 March 1970, and won for Fianna Fáil by Seán Sherwin; the Labour candidate, Matt Merrigan, lost by only 262 votes after Dunne's widow Cora stood as an independent candidate.

Trade union offices
New office	General Secretary of the Federation of Rural Workers; 1946–1954	Succeeded by James Tully
Preceded by Jim Collins	Secretary of the Dublin Trades Council; 1960–1968	Succeeded by Tom Brady

Dáil	Election	Deputy (Party)	Deputy (Party)	Deputy (Party)	Deputy (Party)	Deputy (Party)	Deputy (Party)	Deputy (Party)	Deputy (Party)
2nd	1921	Michael Derham (SF)	George Gavan Duffy (SF)	Séamus Dwyer (SF)	Desmond FitzGerald (SF)	Frank Lawless (SF)	Margaret Pearse (SF)	6 seats 1921–1923	
3rd	1922	Michael Derham (PT-SF)	George Gavan Duffy (PT-SF)	Thomas Johnson (Lab)	Desmond FitzGerald (PT-SF)	Darrell Figgis (Ind)	John Rooney (FP)	6 seats 1921–1923	
4th	1923	Michael Derham (CnaG)	Bryan Cooper (Ind)	Thomas Johnson (Lab)	Desmond FitzGerald (CnaG)	Darrell Figgis (Ind)	John Good (Ind)	Kathleen Lynn (Rep)	Kevin O'Higgins (CnaG)
4th	1924 by-election	Batt O'Connor (CnaG)	Bryan Cooper (Ind)	Thomas Johnson (Lab)	Desmond FitzGerald (CnaG)	Darrell Figgis (Ind)	John Good (Ind)	Kathleen Lynn (Rep)	Kevin O'Higgins (CnaG)
4th	1926 by-election	Batt O'Connor (CnaG)	Bryan Cooper (Ind)	Thomas Johnson (Lab)	Desmond FitzGerald (CnaG)	William Norton (Lab)	John Good (Ind)	Kathleen Lynn (Rep)	Kevin O'Higgins (CnaG)
5th	1927 (Jun)	Batt O'Connor (CnaG)	Bryan Cooper (Ind)	Thomas Johnson (Lab)	Desmond FitzGerald (CnaG)	Patrick Belton (FF)	John Good (Ind)	Seán MacEntee (FF)	Kevin O'Higgins (CnaG)
5th	1927 by-election	Batt O'Connor (CnaG)	Bryan Cooper (Ind)	Thomas Johnson (Lab)	Desmond FitzGerald (CnaG)	Patrick Belton (FF)	John Good (Ind)	Seán MacEntee (FF)	Gearóid O'Sullivan (CnaG)
6th	1927 (Sep)	Batt O'Connor (CnaG)	Bryan Cooper (CnaG)	Joseph Murphy (Ind)	Desmond FitzGerald (CnaG)	Seán Brady (FF)	John Good (Ind)	Seán MacEntee (FF)	Gearóid O'Sullivan (CnaG)
6th	1930 by-election	Batt O'Connor (CnaG)	Thomas Finlay (CnaG)	Joseph Murphy (Ind)	Desmond FitzGerald (CnaG)	Seán Brady (FF)	John Good (Ind)	Seán MacEntee (FF)	Gearóid O'Sullivan (CnaG)
7th	1932	Batt O'Connor (CnaG)	Thomas Finlay (CnaG)	Patrick Curran (Lab)	Henry Dockrell (CnaG)	Seán Brady (FF)	John Good (Ind)	Seán MacEntee (FF)	Gearóid O'Sullivan (CnaG)
8th	1933	Batt O'Connor (CnaG)	John A. Costello (CnaG)	Margaret Mary Pearse (FF)	Henry Dockrell (CnaG)	Seán Brady (FF)	John Good (Ind)	Seán MacEntee (FF)	Gearóid O'Sullivan (CnaG)
8th	1935 by-election	Cecil Lavery (FG)	John A. Costello (CnaG)	Margaret Mary Pearse (FF)	Henry Dockrell (CnaG)	Seán Brady (FF)	John Good (Ind)	Seán MacEntee (FF)	Gearóid O'Sullivan (CnaG)
9th	1937	Cecil Lavery (FG)	Henry Dockrell (FG)	Gerrard McGowan (Lab)	Patrick Fogarty (FF)	Seán Brady (FF)	5 seats 1937–1948		
10th	1938	Patrick Belton (FG)	Henry Dockrell (FG)	Thomas Mullen (FF)	Patrick Fogarty (FF)	Seán Brady (FF)	5 seats 1937–1948		
11th	1943	Liam Cosgrave (FG)	Henry Dockrell (FG)	James Tunney (Lab)	Patrick Fogarty (FF)	Seán Brady (FF)	5 seats 1937–1948		
12th	1944	Liam Cosgrave (FG)	Henry Dockrell (FG)	Patrick Burke (FF)	Patrick Fogarty (FF)	Seán Brady (FF)	5 seats 1937–1948		
12th	1947 by-election	Liam Cosgrave (FG)	Henry Dockrell (FG)	Patrick Burke (FF)	Seán MacBride (CnaP)	Seán Brady (FF)	5 seats 1937–1948		
13th	1948	Éamon Rooney (FG)	Seán Dunne (Lab)	Patrick Burke (FF)	3 seats 1948–1961				
14th	1951	Éamon Rooney (FG)	Seán Dunne (Lab)	Patrick Burke (FF)	3 seats 1948–1961				
15th	1954	Éamon Rooney (FG)	Seán Dunne (Lab)	Patrick Burke (FF)	3 seats 1948–1961				
16th	1957	Éamon Rooney (FG)	Kevin Boland (FF)	Patrick Burke (FF)	3 seats 1948–1961				
17th	1961	Éamon Rooney (FG)	Kevin Boland (FF)	Patrick Burke (FF)	Mark Clinton (FG)	Seán Dunne (Ind)	5 seats 1961–1969		
18th	1965	Des Foley (FF)	Kevin Boland (FF)	Patrick Burke (FF)	Mark Clinton (FG)	Seán Dunne (Lab)	5 seats 1961–1969		
19th	1969	Constituency abolished. See Dublin County North and Dublin County South							

Dáil	Election	Deputy (Party)	Deputy (Party)	Deputy (Party)	Deputy (Party)	Deputy (Party)
13th	1948	Seán MacBride (CnaP)	Peadar Doyle (FG)	Bernard Butler (FF)	Michael O'Higgins (FG)	Robert Briscoe (FF)
14th	1951	Seán MacBride (CnaP)	Peadar Doyle (FG)	Bernard Butler (FF)	Michael ffrench-O'Carroll (Ind.)	Robert Briscoe (FF)
15th	1954	Seán MacBride (CnaP)	Peadar Doyle (FG)	Bernard Butler (FF)	Michael O'Higgins (FG)	Robert Briscoe (FF)
15th	1956 by-election	Seán MacBride (CnaP)	Noel Lemass (FF)	Bernard Butler (FF)	Michael O'Higgins (FG)	Robert Briscoe (FF)
16th	1957	James Carroll (Ind.)	Noel Lemass (FF)	Bernard Butler (FF)	Michael O'Higgins (FG)	Robert Briscoe (FF)
16th	1959 by-election	James Carroll (Ind.)	Noel Lemass (FF)	Richie Ryan (FG)	Michael O'Higgins (FG)	Robert Briscoe (FF)
17th	1961	James Carroll (Ind.)	Noel Lemass (FF)	Richie Ryan (FG)	James O'Keeffe (FG)	Robert Briscoe (FF)
18th	1965	John O'Connell (Lab)	Noel Lemass (FF)	Richie Ryan (FG)	Joseph Dowling (FF)	Ben Briscoe (FF)
19th	1969	John O'Connell (Lab)	Noel Lemass (FF)	Seán Dunne (Lab)	Joseph Dowling (FF)	4 seats 1969–1977
19th	1970 by-election	John O'Connell (Lab)	Noel Lemass (FF)	Seán Sherwin (FF)	Joseph Dowling (FF)	4 seats 1969–1977
20th	1973	John O'Connell (Lab)	Noel Lemass (FF)	Declan Costello (FG)	Joseph Dowling (FF)	4 seats 1969–1977
20th	1976 by-election	John O'Connell (Lab)	Brendan Halligan (Lab)	Declan Costello (FG)	Joseph Dowling (FF)	4 seats 1969–1977
21st	1977	Constituency abolished. See Dublin Ballyfermot				

Dáil	Election	Deputy (Party)	Deputy (Party)	Deputy (Party)	Deputy (Party)	Deputy (Party)
22nd	1981	Seán Walsh (FF)	Larry McMahon (FG)	Mary Harney (FF)	Mervyn Taylor (Lab)	4 seats 1981–1992
23rd	1982 (Feb)	Seán Walsh (FF)	Larry McMahon (FG)	Mary Harney (FF)	Mervyn Taylor (Lab)	4 seats 1981–1992
24th	1982 (Nov)	Seán Walsh (FF)	Michael O'Leary (FG)	Mary Harney (FF)	Mervyn Taylor (Lab)	4 seats 1981–1992
25th	1987	Seán Walsh (FF)	Chris Flood (FF)	Mary Harney (PDs)	Mervyn Taylor (Lab)	4 seats 1981–1992
26th	1989	Pat Rabbitte (WP)	Chris Flood (FF)	Mary Harney (PDs)	Mervyn Taylor (Lab)	4 seats 1981–1992
27th	1992	Pat Rabbitte (DL)	Chris Flood (FF)	Mary Harney (PDs)	Mervyn Taylor (Lab)	Éamonn Walsh (Lab)
28th	1997	Pat Rabbitte (DL)	Chris Flood (FF)	Mary Harney (PDs)	Conor Lenihan (FF)	Brian Hayes (FG)
29th	2002	Pat Rabbitte (Lab)	Charlie O'Connor (FF)	Seán Crowe (SF)	Conor Lenihan (FF)	4 seats 2002–2016
30th	2007	Pat Rabbitte (Lab)	Charlie O'Connor (FF)	Brian Hayes (FG)	Conor Lenihan (FF)	4 seats 2002–2016
31st	2011	Pat Rabbitte (Lab)	Eamonn Maloney (Lab)	Brian Hayes (FG)	Seán Crowe (SF)	4 seats 2002–2016
31st	2014 by-election	Pat Rabbitte (Lab)	Eamonn Maloney (Lab)	Paul Murphy (AAA)	Seán Crowe (SF)	4 seats 2002–2016
32nd	2016	Colm Brophy (FG)	John Lahart (FF)	Paul Murphy (AAA–PBP)	Seán Crowe (SF)	Katherine Zappone (Ind.)
33rd	2020	Colm Brophy (FG)	John Lahart (FF)	Paul Murphy (S–PBP)	Seán Crowe (SF)	Francis Noel Duffy (GP)
34th	2024	Colm Brophy (FG)	John Lahart (FF)	Paul Murphy (PBP–S)	Seán Crowe (SF)	Ciarán Ahern (Lab)
