= 1970 Dublin County South by-election =

By-election to the 19th Dáil

- 2 December 1970
- Turnout: 24,922 (61.9%)
	McMahon	Murphy	O'Sullivan
Nominee	Larry McMahon	James Murphy	Donal O'Sullivan
Party	Fine Gael	Fianna Fáil	Labour
First preferences	9,549	8,293	3,449
Percentage	38.3%	33.3%	13.8%
Final count	14,098	9,709	–
TD before election
Kevin Boland
Fianna Fáil
TD after election
Larry McMahon
Fine Gael

A Dáil by-election was held in the constituency of Dublin County South in Ireland on Wednesday, 2 December 1970, to fill a vacancy in the 19th Dáil. It followed the resignation of Fianna Fáil Teachta Dála (TD) Kevin Boland on 4 November 1970.

In May 1970, in the midst of the Arms Crisis, Taoiseach Jack Lynch sacked two cabinet ministers, Charles Haughey and Neil Blaney. Kevin Boland resigned as Minister for Social Welfare. Haughey and Blaney were later charged. On 23 October 1970, after the second of two trials, all defendants were acquitted.

In response to a motion of no confidence submitted by the opposition, Lynch proposed a motion of confidence in the Taoiseach and the government on Thursday, 29 October 1970. The final day of debate was on Wednesday, 4 November. Before the vote was taken on the motion of confidence, Boland submitted his resignation as a TD. Lynch immediately moved the motion to issue the writ of election to fill the vacancy, which was agreed to by the Dáil. Both Haughey and Boland supported the motion of confidence.

The by-election was won by the Fine Gael candidate Larry McMahon. It was held on the same day as the 1970 Donegal–Leitrim by-election.

== Result ==
1970 Dublin County South by-election
Party	Candidate	FPv%	Count			
Party	Candidate	FPv%	1	2	3	4
Fine Gael	Larry McMahon	38.3	9,549	9,679	10,984	14,098
Fianna Fáil	James Murphy	33.3	8,293	8,356	9,044	9,709
Labour	Donal O'Sullivan	13.8	3,449	3,485	4,586	
Independent	Joseph MacAnthony	12.7	3,169	3,377		
Independent	James T. Deegan	1.9	462			
Electorate: 40,216 Valid: 24,922 Quota: 12,462 Turnout: 61.9%
