= John Boland (Fine Gael politician) =

Irish politician (1944–2000)

Minister for Health
- In office 20 January – 10 March 1987
- Taoiseach: Garret FitzGerald
- Preceded by: Barry Desmond
- Succeeded by: Rory O'Hanlon

Minister for the Environment
- In office 14 February 1986 – 10 March 1987
- Taoiseach: Garret FitzGerald
- Preceded by: Liam Kavanagh
- Succeeded by: Pádraig Flynn

Minister for the Public Service
- In office 14 December 1982 – 14 February 1986
- Taoiseach: Garret FitzGerald
- Preceded by: Gene Fitzgerald
- Succeeded by: Ruairi Quinn

Minister for Education
- In office 30 June 1981 – 9 March 1982
- Taoiseach: Garret FitzGerald
- Preceded by: John Wilson
- Succeeded by: Martin O'Donoghue

Teachta Dála
- In office June 1981 – June 1989
- Constituency: Dublin North
- In office June 1977 – June 1981
- Constituency: Dublin County North

Senator
- In office 5 November 1969 – 16 June 1977
- Constituency: Labour Panel

Personal details
- Born: 30 November 1944 Dublin, Ireland
- Died: 14 August 2000 (aged 55) Skerries, County Dublin, Ireland
- Party: Fine Gael
- Spouse: Catherine Kennedy (m. 1974)
- Children: 2, including Grace
- Education: University College Dublin; King's Inns

John James Boland (30 November 1944 – 14 August 2000) was an Irish Fine Gael politician who served as Minister for Health from January 1987 to March 1987, Minister for the Environment from 1986 to 1987, Minister for the Public Service from 1982 to 1986 and Minister for Education from 1981 to 1982. He served as a Teachta Dála (TD) from 1977 to 1989. He also served as a Senator for the Labour Panel from 1969 to 1977.

== Biography ==
Boland was born in Dublin in 1944 in Terenure, Dublin, the eldest of two sons and one daughter of Charles Boland and his wife Kathleen Boland (née Whitty), both of whom were civil servants. He was educated at Synge Street CBS school and University College Dublin (UCD), where he received a Bachelor of Commerce degree. While in UCD, he served as editor of the student publication, Awake.

He first held political office in 1967, when he was elected to Dublin County Council at age 23. He served on that authority until 1981. In 1971, he became the council's youngest-ever chairperson at age 26. While a councillor, he was associated with several controversial planning decisions. In 1974, he married Catherine Kennedy; they had one son and one daughter.

Boland first ran for the Dáil Éireann at the 1969 general election, but was unsuccessful. He was elected later that year to the 12th Seanad on the Labour Panel, becoming the youngest-ever Senator at the time. He was re-elected to the Seanad in 1973.

Boland was elected to Dáil on his third attempt at the 1977 general election as a Fine Gael TD for the Dublin County North constituency. He retained his seat at each subsequent election until losing it in the 1989 election.

On becoming Fine Gael leader, Garret FitzGerald appointed Boland to the Opposition front bench as spokesperson on Health; he later served as spokesperson on the Environment.

In 1981, Fine Gael formed a government with the Labour Party, with Boland becoming Minister for Education. In this capacity, he achieved the landmark abolition of corporal punishment in schools.

Boland later served in a range of portfolios in Taoiseach Garret FitzGerald's second government. As Minister for the Public Service, Boland introduced several significant reforms including merit-based promotion (instead of promotions being solely seniority-based as before) and open competitions for the most senior civil service jobs.

Boland changed the law so that civil servants could no longer refuse to provide their names, ensuring greater transparency and accountability.

As Minister for the Public Service, he appointed Ireland's first Ombudsman, Michael Mills.

Boland subsequently served as Minister for the Environment. He led the procurement, on behalf of the State, of Malahide Castle, Ardgillan Demesne, Newbridge House and Farm, Skerries Mills and Red Island, Skerries. He also established the first National Parks Strategy.

After politics, Boland qualified as a barrister and practised on the Dublin and eastern circuits. He also wrote a political column for the Sunday Business Post.

After a long illness with cancer, Boland died on 14 August 2000. Many people paid tribute upon his death, including former Taoisigh FitzGerald and John Bruton. Fitzgerald stated that Boland had done more than any Minister in the history of the State to reform the public service, while Bruton remarked that Boland was "one of the most courageous, imaginative and innovative politicians" he had known.

Political offices
Preceded by John Wilson	Minister for Education; 1981–1982	Succeeded by Martin O'Donoghue
Preceded by Gene Fitzgerald	Minister for the Public Service; 1982–1986	Succeeded by Ruairi Quinn
Preceded by Liam Kavanagh	Minister for the Environment; 1986–1987	Succeeded by Pádraig Flynn
Preceded by Barry Desmond	Minister for Health; 1987	Succeeded by Rory O'Hanlon

Dáil	Election	Deputy (Party)	Deputy (Party)	Deputy (Party)	Deputy (Party)
19th	1969	Patrick Burke (FF)	Des Foley (FF)	Mark Clinton (FG)	Justin Keating (Lab)
20th	1973	Patrick Burke (FF)	Seán Walsh (FF)	Mark Clinton (FG)	Justin Keating (Lab)
21st	1977	Ray Burke (FF)	Joe Fox (FF)	John Boland (FG)	3 seats 1977–1981
22nd	1981	Constituency abolished. See Dublin North			

Dáil	Election	Deputy (Party)	Deputy (Party)	Deputy (Party)	Deputy (Party)	Deputy (Party)	Deputy (Party)	Deputy (Party)	Deputy (Party)
4th	1923	Alfie Byrne (Ind.)	Francis Cahill (CnaG)	Margaret Collins-O'Driscoll (CnaG)	Seán McGarry (CnaG)	William Hewat (BP)	Richard Mulcahy (CnaG)	Seán T. O'Kelly (Rep)	Ernie O'Malley (Rep)
4th	1925 by-election	Alfie Byrne (Ind.)	Patrick Leonard (CnaG)	Margaret Collins-O'Driscoll (CnaG)	Oscar Traynor (Rep)	William Hewat (BP)	Richard Mulcahy (CnaG)	Seán T. O'Kelly (Rep)	Ernie O'Malley (Rep)
5th	1927 (Jun)	Alfie Byrne (Ind.)	John Byrne (CnaG)	Margaret Collins-O'Driscoll (CnaG)	Oscar Traynor (SF)	Denis Cullen (Lab)	Richard Mulcahy (CnaG)	Seán T. O'Kelly (FF)	Kathleen Clarke (FF)
6th	1927 (Sep)	Alfie Byrne (Ind.)	John Byrne (CnaG)	Margaret Collins-O'Driscoll (CnaG)	Patrick Leonard (CnaG)	James Larkin (IWL)	Richard Mulcahy (CnaG)	Seán T. O'Kelly (FF)	Eamonn Cooney (FF)
6th	1928 by-election	Alfie Byrne (Ind.)	John Byrne (CnaG)	Margaret Collins-O'Driscoll (CnaG)	Patrick Leonard (CnaG)	Vincent Rice (CnaG)	Richard Mulcahy (CnaG)	Seán T. O'Kelly (FF)	Eamonn Cooney (FF)
6th	1929 by-election	Thomas F. O'Higgins (CnaG)	John Byrne (CnaG)	Margaret Collins-O'Driscoll (CnaG)	Patrick Leonard (CnaG)	Vincent Rice (CnaG)	Richard Mulcahy (CnaG)	Seán T. O'Kelly (FF)	Eamonn Cooney (FF)
7th	1932	Alfie Byrne (Ind.)	John Byrne (CnaG)	Margaret Collins-O'Driscoll (CnaG)	Oscar Traynor (FF)	Cormac Breathnach (FF)	Richard Mulcahy (CnaG)	Seán T. O'Kelly (FF)	Eamonn Cooney (FF)
8th	1933	Alfie Byrne (Ind.)	Patrick Belton (CnaG)	Vincent Rice (CnaG)	Oscar Traynor (FF)	Cormac Breathnach (FF)	Richard Mulcahy (CnaG)	Seán T. O'Kelly (FF)	Eamonn Cooney (FF)
9th	1937	Constituency abolished. See Dublin North-East and Dublin North-West							

Dáil	Election	Deputy (Party)	Deputy (Party)	Deputy (Party)	Deputy (Party)
22nd	1981	Ray Burke (FF)	John Boland (FG)	Nora Owen (FG)	3 seats 1981–1992
23rd	1982 (Feb)	Ray Burke (FF)	John Boland (FG)	Nora Owen (FG)	3 seats 1981–1992
24th	1982 (Nov)	Ray Burke (FF)	John Boland (FG)	Nora Owen (FG)	3 seats 1981–1992
25th	1987	Ray Burke (FF)	John Boland (FG)	G. V. Wright (FF)	3 seats 1981–1992
26th	1989	Ray Burke (FF)	Nora Owen (FG)	Seán Ryan (Lab)	3 seats 1981–1992
27th	1992	Ray Burke (FF)	Nora Owen (FG)	Seán Ryan (Lab)	Trevor Sargent (GP)
28th	1997	Ray Burke (FF)	Nora Owen (FG)	G. V. Wright (FF)	Trevor Sargent (GP)
28th	1998 by-election	Seán Ryan (Lab)	Nora Owen (FG)	G. V. Wright (FF)	Trevor Sargent (GP)
29th	2002	Seán Ryan (Lab)	Jim Glennon (FF)	G. V. Wright (FF)	Trevor Sargent (GP)
30th	2007	James Reilly (FG)	Michael Kennedy (FF)	Darragh O'Brien (FF)	Trevor Sargent (GP)
31st	2011	James Reilly (FG)	Alan Farrell (FG)	Brendan Ryan (Lab)	Clare Daly (SP)
32nd	2016	Constituency abolished. See Dublin Fingal			
