= Federation of Rural Workers =

- Federation of Rural Workers of Ireland
- Predecessor: Irish National Agricultural and General Labourers' Union
- Merged into: Workers' Union of Ireland
- Founded: 1946
- Dissolved: 1979
- Location: Ireland
- Members: 6,301 (1970)
- Affiliations: ICTU

The Federation of Rural Workers of Ireland (FRW) was a trade union representing agricultural workers in Ireland.

== History ==
Agricultural workers in Ireland had been represented by the Irish National Agricultural and General Labourers' Union, but this collapsed in 1928. Some members transferred to the Workers' Union of Ireland, but most found themselves outside the union movement.

By 1946, the Irish Trades Union Congress was concerned that most agricultural workers were not organised as part of the union movement. It formed the "Federation of Rural Workers of Ireland", with eligible members of the Workers' Union transferring to it. Its initial officers were also from the Workers' Union, with James Larkin Jnr becoming president, and Sean Dunne serving as its first general secretary.

Despite the broad support in the union movement, the union's initial membership was only 1,431. It grew steadily, facing much opposition from farmers who were reluctant to recognise it. By 1970, its membership reached a peak of 6,301.

In 1979, the union merged into the Workers' Union, which as a result renamed itself as the "Federated Workers' Union of Ireland".

== General Secretaries ==
1946: Seán Dunne
1954: James Tully
1970s: Paddy Murphy
