= Seán Sherwin =

Irish politician (1946–2025)

Teachta Dála
- In office March 1970 – February 1973
- Constituency: Dublin South-West

Personal details
- Born: 12 December 1946 Dublin, Ireland
- Died: 30 April 2025 (aged 78) County Roscommon, Ireland
- Party: Fianna Fáil
- Other political affiliations: Aontacht Éireann
- Spouse: Betty Davis
- Children: 3

Seán Sherwin (12 December 1946 – 30 April 2025) was an Irish Fianna Fáil politician.

== Life and career ==
Sherwin was an unsuccessful candidate for the Dublin South-West constituency at the 1969 general election. However, Dublin South-West's long-serving Labour Party TD Seán Dunne, who had been re-elected at the general election, died only seven days after polling. Sherwin was selected as the Fianna Fáil candidate at the by-election on 4 March 1970, and won, taking his seat in the 19th Dáil, aged 23.

He resigned from Fianna Fáil in 1971 in the wake of the Arms Crisis, and joined Kevin Boland's new party Aontacht Éireann. The new party failed to take off at the 1973 general election, and Sherwin lost his seat to Fine Gael's Declan Costello.

Sherwin later rejoined Fianna Fáil, and at the November 1982 general election he was one of four Fianna Fáil candidates in Dublin West. He won only 2.1% of the first-preference votes and was not elected.

Sherwin died at his home in Roosky, County Roscommon, on 30 April 2025, at the age of 78.

Dáil	Election	Deputy (Party)	Deputy (Party)	Deputy (Party)	Deputy (Party)	Deputy (Party)
13th	1948	Seán MacBride (CnaP)	Peadar Doyle (FG)	Bernard Butler (FF)	Michael O'Higgins (FG)	Robert Briscoe (FF)
14th	1951	Seán MacBride (CnaP)	Peadar Doyle (FG)	Bernard Butler (FF)	Michael ffrench-O'Carroll (Ind.)	Robert Briscoe (FF)
15th	1954	Seán MacBride (CnaP)	Peadar Doyle (FG)	Bernard Butler (FF)	Michael O'Higgins (FG)	Robert Briscoe (FF)
15th	1956 by-election	Seán MacBride (CnaP)	Noel Lemass (FF)	Bernard Butler (FF)	Michael O'Higgins (FG)	Robert Briscoe (FF)
16th	1957	James Carroll (Ind.)	Noel Lemass (FF)	Bernard Butler (FF)	Michael O'Higgins (FG)	Robert Briscoe (FF)
16th	1959 by-election	James Carroll (Ind.)	Noel Lemass (FF)	Richie Ryan (FG)	Michael O'Higgins (FG)	Robert Briscoe (FF)
17th	1961	James Carroll (Ind.)	Noel Lemass (FF)	Richie Ryan (FG)	James O'Keeffe (FG)	Robert Briscoe (FF)
18th	1965	John O'Connell (Lab)	Noel Lemass (FF)	Richie Ryan (FG)	Joseph Dowling (FF)	Ben Briscoe (FF)
19th	1969	John O'Connell (Lab)	Noel Lemass (FF)	Seán Dunne (Lab)	Joseph Dowling (FF)	4 seats 1969–1977
19th	1970 by-election	John O'Connell (Lab)	Noel Lemass (FF)	Seán Sherwin (FF)	Joseph Dowling (FF)	4 seats 1969–1977
20th	1973	John O'Connell (Lab)	Noel Lemass (FF)	Declan Costello (FG)	Joseph Dowling (FF)	4 seats 1969–1977
20th	1976 by-election	John O'Connell (Lab)	Brendan Halligan (Lab)	Declan Costello (FG)	Joseph Dowling (FF)	4 seats 1969–1977
21st	1977	Constituency abolished. See Dublin Ballyfermot				

Dáil	Election	Deputy (Party)	Deputy (Party)	Deputy (Party)	Deputy (Party)	Deputy (Party)
22nd	1981	Seán Walsh (FF)	Larry McMahon (FG)	Mary Harney (FF)	Mervyn Taylor (Lab)	4 seats 1981–1992
23rd	1982 (Feb)	Seán Walsh (FF)	Larry McMahon (FG)	Mary Harney (FF)	Mervyn Taylor (Lab)	4 seats 1981–1992
24th	1982 (Nov)	Seán Walsh (FF)	Michael O'Leary (FG)	Mary Harney (FF)	Mervyn Taylor (Lab)	4 seats 1981–1992
25th	1987	Seán Walsh (FF)	Chris Flood (FF)	Mary Harney (PDs)	Mervyn Taylor (Lab)	4 seats 1981–1992
26th	1989	Pat Rabbitte (WP)	Chris Flood (FF)	Mary Harney (PDs)	Mervyn Taylor (Lab)	4 seats 1981–1992
27th	1992	Pat Rabbitte (DL)	Chris Flood (FF)	Mary Harney (PDs)	Mervyn Taylor (Lab)	Éamonn Walsh (Lab)
28th	1997	Pat Rabbitte (DL)	Chris Flood (FF)	Mary Harney (PDs)	Conor Lenihan (FF)	Brian Hayes (FG)
29th	2002	Pat Rabbitte (Lab)	Charlie O'Connor (FF)	Seán Crowe (SF)	Conor Lenihan (FF)	4 seats 2002–2016
30th	2007	Pat Rabbitte (Lab)	Charlie O'Connor (FF)	Brian Hayes (FG)	Conor Lenihan (FF)	4 seats 2002–2016
31st	2011	Pat Rabbitte (Lab)	Eamonn Maloney (Lab)	Brian Hayes (FG)	Seán Crowe (SF)	4 seats 2002–2016
31st	2014 by-election	Pat Rabbitte (Lab)	Eamonn Maloney (Lab)	Paul Murphy (AAA)	Seán Crowe (SF)	4 seats 2002–2016
32nd	2016	Colm Brophy (FG)	John Lahart (FF)	Paul Murphy (AAA–PBP)	Seán Crowe (SF)	Katherine Zappone (Ind.)
33rd	2020	Colm Brophy (FG)	John Lahart (FF)	Paul Murphy (S–PBP)	Seán Crowe (SF)	Francis Noel Duffy (GP)
34th	2024	Colm Brophy (FG)	John Lahart (FF)	Paul Murphy (PBP–S)	Seán Crowe (SF)	Ciarán Ahern (Lab)
