= Liam Kavanagh =

Irish politician (1935–2021)

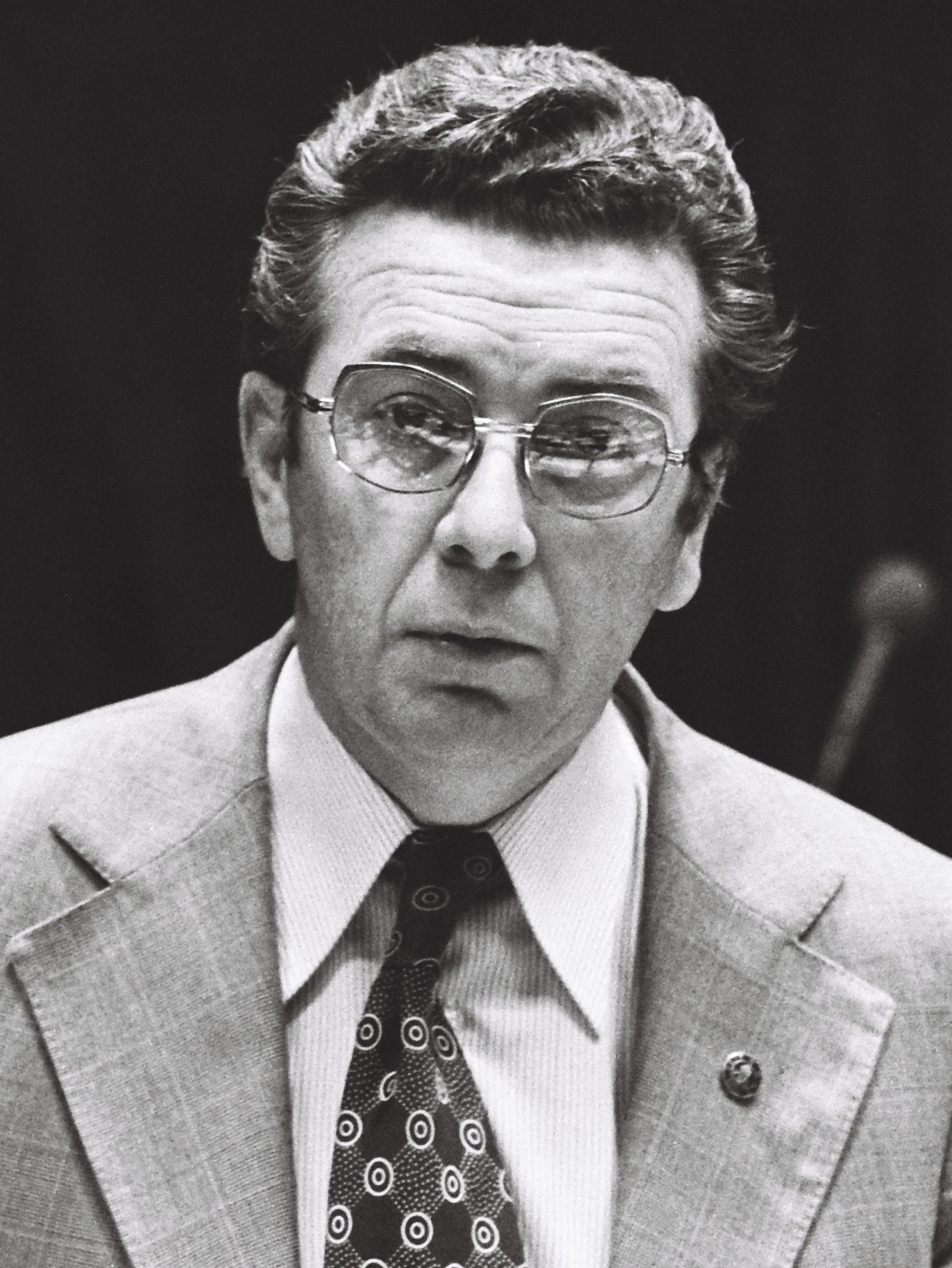
- Kavanagh in 1980

Minister for Tourism, Fisheries and Forestry
- In office 14 February 1986 – 20 January 1987
- Taoiseach: Garret FitzGerald
- Preceded by: Paddy O'Toole
- Succeeded by: Paddy O'Toole

Minister for the Environment
- In office 13 December 1983 – 14 February 1986
- Taoiseach: Garret FitzGerald
- Preceded by: Dick Spring
- Succeeded by: John Boland

Minister for Labour
- In office 14 December 1982 – 13 December 1983
- Taoiseach: Garret FitzGerald
- Preceded by: Gene Fitzgerald
- Succeeded by: Ruairi Quinn
- In office 30 June 1981 – 9 March 1982
- Taoiseach: Garret FitzGerald
- Preceded by: Tom Nolan
- Succeeded by: Gene Fitzgerald

Minister for the Public Service
- In office 30 June 1981 – 9 March 1982
- Taoiseach: Garret FitzGerald
- Preceded by: Gene Fitzgerald
- Succeeded by: Gene Fitzgerald

Teachta Dála
- In office June 1969 – June 1997
- Constituency: Wicklow

Member of the European Parliament
- In office June 1979 – July 1981
- Constituency: Leinster
- In office January 1973 – June 1979
- Constituency: Oireachtas Delegation

Personal details
- Born: 9 February 1935; County Wicklow, Ireland
- Died: 13 December 2021 (aged 86); County Wicklow, Ireland
- Political party: Labour
- Spouse: Margaret Kavanagh
- Children: 2

Liam Kavanagh (9 February 1935 – 13 December 2021) was an Irish Labour Party politician.

== Biography ==
He was elected to Dáil Éireann at the 1969 general election as a Labour Party Teachta Dála (TD) for the Wicklow constituency. He remained in the Dáil until he lost his seat at the 1997 general election. He was also appointed to the European Parliament on two occasions in 1973 and 1977 and was elected to the parliament in 1979 for the Leinster constituency. He gave up this seat on being appointed Minister for Labour and Minister for the Public Service in 1981.

Kavanagh also served as a member of the British–Irish Parliamentary Assembly from 1990 to 1997 and of the Semi-State Bodies Commission from 1987 to 1997, being chairman from 1995 to 1997.

He was appointed to the Standards in Public Office Commission on its establishment in December 2001.

Kavanagh was the nephew of James Everett, a former Labour Party cabinet minister. His own son Conal Kavanagh was a member of Wicklow County Council and Wicklow Town Council from 2004 until he retired in 2014.

He died on 13 December 2021, at the age of 86.

Political offices
Preceded by Gene Fitzgerald	Minister for the Public Service; 1981–1982	Succeeded by Gene Fitzgerald
Preceded by Tom Nolan	Minister for Labour; 1981–1982	Succeeded by Gene Fitzgerald
Preceded by Gene Fitzgerald	Minister for Labour; 1982–1983	Succeeded by Ruairi Quinn
Preceded by Dick Spring	Minister for the Environment; 1983–1986	Succeeded by John Boland
Preceded by Paddy O'Toole	Minister for Tourism, Fisheries and Forestry; 1986–1987	Succeeded by Paddy O'Toole

Dáil	Election	Deputy (Party)	Deputy (Party)	Deputy (Party)	Deputy (Party)	Deputy (Party)
4th	1923	Christopher Byrne (CnaG)	James Everett (Lab)	Richard Wilson (FP)	3 seats 1923–1981	
5th	1927 (Jun)	Séamus Moore (FF)	James Everett (Lab)	Dermot O'Mahony (CnaG)	3 seats 1923–1981	
6th	1927 (Sep)	Séamus Moore (FF)	James Everett (Lab)	Dermot O'Mahony (CnaG)	3 seats 1923–1981	
7th	1932	Séamus Moore (FF)	James Everett (Lab)	Dermot O'Mahony (CnaG)	3 seats 1923–1981	
8th	1933	Séamus Moore (FF)	James Everett (Lab)	Dermot O'Mahony (CnaG)	3 seats 1923–1981	
9th	1937	Séamus Moore (FF)	James Everett (Lab)	Dermot O'Mahony (FG)	3 seats 1923–1981	
10th	1938	Séamus Moore (FF)	James Everett (Lab)	Patrick Cogan (Ind)	3 seats 1923–1981	
11th	1943	Christopher Byrne (FF)	James Everett (Lab)	Patrick Cogan (CnaT)	3 seats 1923–1981	
12th	1944	Thomas Brennan (FF)	James Everett (NLP)	Patrick Cogan (CnaT)	3 seats 1923–1981	
13th	1948	Thomas Brennan (FF)	James Everett (NLP)	Patrick Cogan (Ind)	3 seats 1923–1981	
14th	1951	Thomas Brennan (FF)	James Everett (Lab)	Patrick Cogan (Ind)	3 seats 1923–1981	
14th	1953 by-election	Mark Deering (FG)	James Everett (Lab)	Patrick Cogan (Ind)	3 seats 1923–1981	
15th	1954	Mark Deering (FG)	James Everett (Lab)	Paudge Brennan (FF)	3 seats 1923–1981	
16th	1957	James O'Toole (FF)	James Everett (Lab)	Paudge Brennan (FF)	3 seats 1923–1981	
17th	1961	Michael O'Higgins (FG)	James Everett (Lab)	Paudge Brennan (FF)	3 seats 1923–1981	
18th	1965	Michael O'Higgins (FG)	James Everett (Lab)	Paudge Brennan (FF)	3 seats 1923–1981	
18th	1968 by-election	Michael O'Higgins (FG)	Godfrey Timmins (FG)	Paudge Brennan (FF)	3 seats 1923–1981	
19th	1969	Liam Kavanagh (Lab)	Godfrey Timmins (FG)	Paudge Brennan (FF)	3 seats 1923–1981	
20th	1973	Liam Kavanagh (Lab)	Godfrey Timmins (FG)	Ciarán Murphy (FF)	3 seats 1923–1981	
21st	1977	Liam Kavanagh (Lab)	Godfrey Timmins (FG)	Ciarán Murphy (FF)	3 seats 1923–1981	
22nd	1981	Liam Kavanagh (Lab)	Godfrey Timmins (FG)	Ciarán Murphy (FF)	Paudge Brennan (FF)	4 seats 1981–1992
23rd	1982 (Feb)	Liam Kavanagh (Lab)	Godfrey Timmins (FG)	Ciarán Murphy (FF)	Gemma Hussey (FG)	4 seats 1981–1992
24th	1982 (Nov)	Liam Kavanagh (Lab)	Godfrey Timmins (FG)	Paudge Brennan (FF)	Gemma Hussey (FG)	4 seats 1981–1992
25th	1987	Liam Kavanagh (Lab)	Joe Jacob (FF)	Dick Roche (FF)	Gemma Hussey (FG)	4 seats 1981–1992
26th	1989	Liam Kavanagh (Lab)	Joe Jacob (FF)	Dick Roche (FF)	Godfrey Timmins (FG)	4 seats 1981–1992
27th	1992	Liam Kavanagh (Lab)	Joe Jacob (FF)	Liz McManus (DL)	Godfrey Timmins (FG)	Johnny Fox (Ind)
27th	1995 by-election	Liam Kavanagh (Lab)	Joe Jacob (FF)	Liz McManus (DL)	Godfrey Timmins (FG)	Mildred Fox (Ind)
28th	1997	Dick Roche (FF)	Joe Jacob (FF)	Liz McManus (DL)	Billy Timmins (FG)	Mildred Fox (Ind)
29th	2002	Dick Roche (FF)	Joe Jacob (FF)	Liz McManus (Lab)	Billy Timmins (FG)	Mildred Fox (Ind)
30th	2007	Dick Roche (FF)	Joe Behan (FF)	Liz McManus (Lab)	Billy Timmins (FG)	Andrew Doyle (FG)
31st	2011	Simon Harris (FG)	Stephen Donnelly (Ind)	Anne Ferris (Lab)	Billy Timmins (FG)	Andrew Doyle (FG)
32nd	2016	Simon Harris (FG)	Stephen Donnelly (SD)	John Brady (SF)	Pat Casey (FF)	Andrew Doyle (FG)
33rd	2020	Simon Harris (FG)	Stephen Donnelly (FF)	John Brady (SF)	Jennifer Whitmore (SD)	Steven Matthews (GP)
34th	2024	Simon Harris (FG)	Edward Timmins (FG)	John Brady (SF)	Jennifer Whitmore (SD)	4 seats since 2024
