= Barry Desmond =

Irish former politician (born 1935)

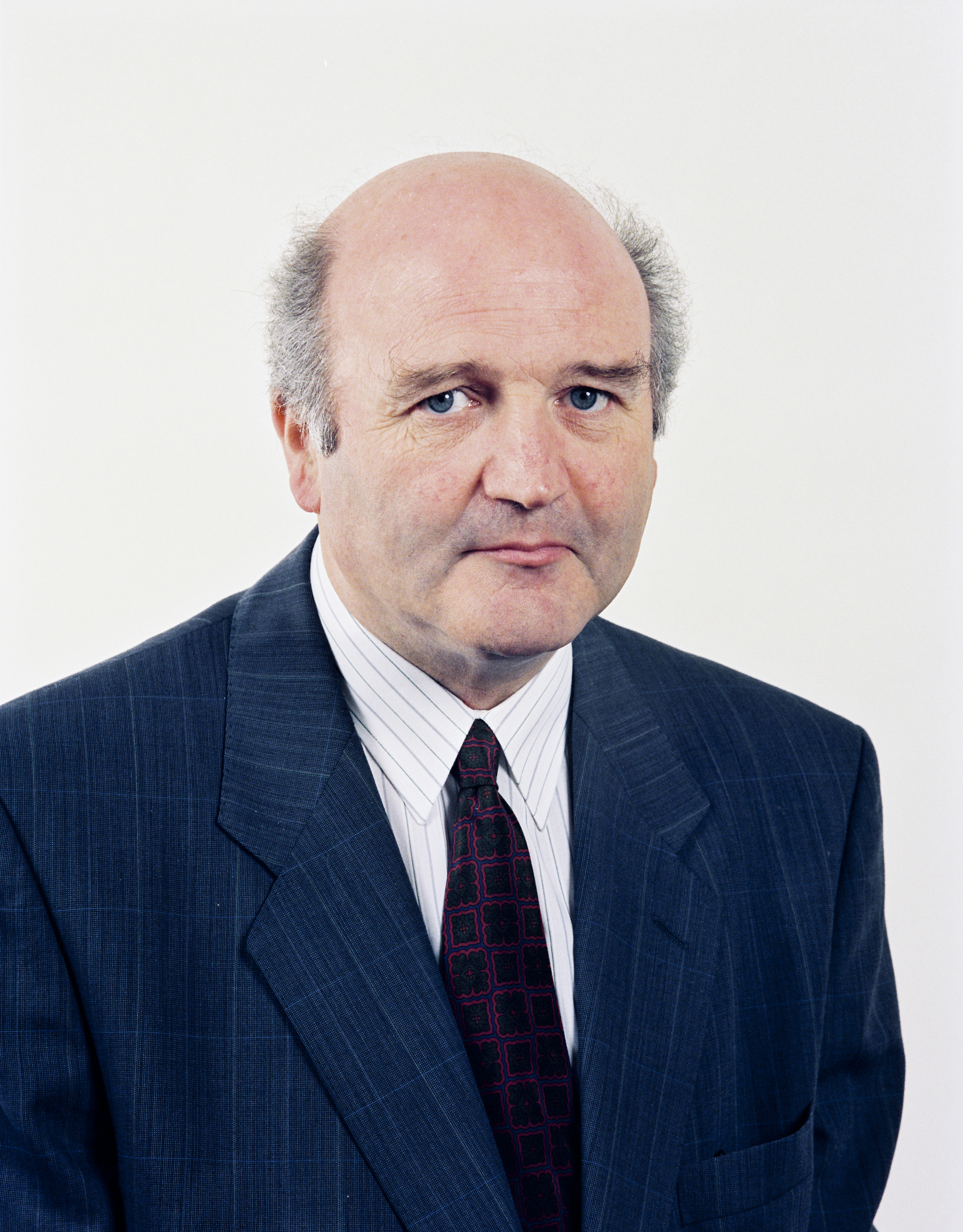
- Desmond, c. 1989

Member of the European Court of Auditors
- In office 13 July 1994 – 1 March 2000
- Preceded by: Richie Ryan
- Succeeded by: Máire Geoghegan-Quinn

Minister for Health
- In office 14 December 1982 – 20 January 1987
- Taoiseach: Garret FitzGerald
- Preceded by: Michael Woods
- Succeeded by: John Boland

Minister for Social Welfare
- In office 14 December 1982 – 14 February 1986
- Taoiseach: Garret FitzGerald
- Preceded by: Michael Woods
- Succeeded by: Gemma Hussey

Deputy leader of the Labour Party
- In office 22 February 1982 – 4 July 1989
- Leader: Dick Spring
- Preceded by: James Tully
- Succeeded by: Ruairi Quinn

Minister of State
- 1981–1982: Finance

Member of the European Parliament
- In office 1 July 1989 – 22 May 1994
- Constituency: Dublin

Teachta Dála
- In office June 1977 – June 1989
- Constituency: Dún Laoghaire
- In office June 1969 – June 1977
- Constituency: Dún Laoghaire and Rathdown

Personal details
- Born: 15 May 1935 (age 91) Cork, Ireland
- Party: Labour Party
- Spouse: Stella Murphy (m. 1960)
- Children: 4
- Parent: Cornelius Desmond (father)
- Education: Cork College of Commerce; University College Cork

Barry Desmond (born 15 May 1935) is an Irish former Labour Party politician who was Minister for Health from 1982 to 1987 and Minister for Social Welfare from 1982 to 1986. He served as a Teachta Dála (TD) from 1969 to 1989, a Minister of State from 1981 to 1982, a Member of the European Parliament (MEP) for Dublin from 1989 to 1994, and Ireland's member of the European Court of Auditors from 1994 to 2000.

== Early life ==
Desmond was born in Cork in 1935 and was educated at Coláiste Chríost Rí, the School of Commerce and University College Cork. He became a trade union official with the ITGWU (which would later merge with other trade unions, becoming SIPTU) and the Irish Congress of Trade Unions. His father Cornelius Desmond was Lord Mayor of Cork from 1965 to 1966 and was active in the labour movement. Cornelius Desmond was the President of the ITGWU in Cork.

== Political career ==
Desmond first entered Dáil Éireann at the 1969 general election, when he was elected as a Labour Party TD for Dún Laoghaire and Rathdown. He retained his seat in 1973. He was then elected in 1977 at Dún Laoghaire, where he won a seat at every election until he retired from the Dáil in 1989. From 1981 to 1982, he served as Minister of State at the Department of Finance with responsibility for Economic Planning, under Garret FitzGerald as Taoiseach. In 1982, after Michael O'Leary's resignation as Labour Party leader, Dick Spring was elected as the party's new leader and Desmond was chosen as his deputy.

After the November 1982 general election, Fine Gael and the Labour Party formed a majority government. In the second FitzGerald administration, Desmond was appointed Minister for Social Welfare and Minister for Health. FitzGerald began a major cabinet reshuffle in February 1986, intending to appoint him as Minister for Justice; Desmond refused, and Spring supported him in that attitude. He remained as Minister for Health while Gemma Hussey took on the Social Welfare portfolio.

On 20 January 1987, the Labour ministers resigned from the government; this led to the 1987 general election, as a result of which Fianna Fáil returned to office. Desmond did not contest the 1989 general election. On 15 June 1989, he was elected as a Labour Party MEP for Dublin, serving until 1994. He then served as a member of the European Court of Auditors from 1994 to 2000, being replaced by Máire Geoghegan-Quinn.

== After politics ==
Desmond was elected president of the Maritime Institute of Ireland on 18 November 2006. He remains a member of the Council of the Maritime Institute of Ireland. As president, he oversaw the revision of its articles of association and the securing of €3.2 million in funding for the restoration of Mariners' Church, Dún Laoghaire, which houses the National Maritime Museum of Ireland.

== Bibliography ==
- Desmond, Barry (June 2009). No Workers' Republic – Reflections on Labour and Ireland 1913–1967. Dublin: Watchword. ISBN 978-0-9557249-3-0.

Political offices
Preceded by Michael Woods	Minister for Social Welfare; 1982–1986	Succeeded by Gemma Hussey
Preceded by Michael Woods	Minister for Health; 1982–1987	Succeeded by John Boland

Dáil	Election	Deputy (Party)	Deputy (Party)	Deputy (Party)	Deputy (Party)
13th	1948	Seán Brady (FF)	Joseph Brennan (CnaP)	Liam Cosgrave (FG)	3 seats until 1961
14th	1951	Seán Brady (FF)	Percy Dockrell (FG)	Liam Cosgrave (FG)	3 seats until 1961
15th	1954	Seán Brady (FF)	Percy Dockrell (FG)	Liam Cosgrave (FG)	3 seats until 1961
16th	1957	Seán Brady (FF)	Lionel Booth (FF)	Liam Cosgrave (FG)	3 seats until 1961
17th	1961	Seán Brady (FF)	Lionel Booth (FF)	Liam Cosgrave (FG)	Percy Dockrell (FG)
18th	1965	David Andrews (FF)	Lionel Booth (FF)	Liam Cosgrave (FG)	Percy Dockrell (FG)
19th	1969	David Andrews (FF)	Barry Desmond (Lab)	Liam Cosgrave (FG)	Percy Dockrell (FG)
20th	1973	David Andrews (FF)	Barry Desmond (Lab)	Liam Cosgrave (FG)	Percy Dockrell (FG)
21st	1977	Constituency abolished. See Dún Laoghaire			

Dáil	Election	Deputy (Party)	Deputy (Party)	Deputy (Party)	Deputy (Party)	Deputy (Party)
21st	1977	David Andrews (FF)	Liam Cosgrave (FG)	Barry Desmond (Lab)	Martin O'Donoghue (FF)	4 seats 1977–1981
22nd	1981	David Andrews (FF)	Liam T. Cosgrave (FG)	Barry Desmond (Lab)	Martin O'Donoghue (FF)	Seán Barrett (FG)
23rd	1982 (Feb)	David Andrews (FF)	Liam T. Cosgrave (FG)	Barry Desmond (Lab)	Martin O'Donoghue (FF)	Seán Barrett (FG)
24th	1982 (Nov)	David Andrews (FF)	Liam T. Cosgrave (FG)	Barry Desmond (Lab)	Monica Barnes (FG)	Seán Barrett (FG)
25th	1987	David Andrews (FF)	Geraldine Kennedy (PDs)	Barry Desmond (Lab)	Monica Barnes (FG)	Seán Barrett (FG)
26th	1989	David Andrews (FF)	Brian Hillery (FF)	Eamon Gilmore (WP)	Monica Barnes (FG)	Seán Barrett (FG)
27th	1992	David Andrews (FF)	Helen Keogh (PDs)	Eamon Gilmore (DL)	Niamh Bhreathnach (Lab)	Seán Barrett (FG)
28th	1997	David Andrews (FF)	Monica Barnes (FG)	Eamon Gilmore (Lab)	Mary Hanafin (FF)	Seán Barrett (FG)
29th	2002	Barry Andrews (FF)	Fiona O'Malley (PDs)	Eamon Gilmore (Lab)	Mary Hanafin (FF)	Ciarán Cuffe (GP)
30th	2007	Barry Andrews (FF)	Seán Barrett (Note: Served as Ceann Comhairle in the 31st Dáil from 2011 to 2016 and was returned automatically at the 2016 general election.) (FG)	Eamon Gilmore (Lab)	Mary Hanafin (FF)	Ciarán Cuffe (GP)
31st	2011	Mary Mitchell O'Connor (FG)	Seán Barrett (FG)	Eamon Gilmore (Lab)	Richard Boyd Barrett (PBP)	4 seats from 2011
32nd	2016	Mary Mitchell O'Connor (FG)	Seán Barrett (FG)	Maria Bailey (FG)	Richard Boyd Barrett (AAA–PBP)	4 seats from 2011
33rd	2020	Jennifer Carroll MacNeill (FG)	Ossian Smyth (GP)	Cormac Devlin (FF)	Richard Boyd Barrett (S–PBP)	4 seats from 2011
34th	2024	Jennifer Carroll MacNeill (FG)	Barry Ward (FG)	Cormac Devlin (FF)	Richard Boyd Barrett (PBP–S)	4 seats from 2011
