= Larry McMahon =

Irish politician (1929–2006)

Senator
- In office 23 February 1983 – 17 February 1993
- Constituency: Labour Panel

Teachta Dála
- In office June 1981 – November 1982
- Constituency: Dublin South-West
- In office June 1977 – June 1981
- Constituency: Dublin County Mid
- In office December 1970 – June 1977
- Constituency: Dublin County South

Personal details
- Born: 18 January 1929 Dublin, Ireland
- Died: 16 February 2006 (aged 77) Dublin, Ireland
- Party: Fine Gael

Lawrence McMahon (18 January 1929 – 16 February 2006) was an Irish Fine Gael politician who served both as a Teachta Dála (TD) and senator.

McMahon was elected to Dáil Éireann at a by-election in 1970 in the Dublin County South constituency, following the resignation of Fianna Fáil TD Kevin Boland. He held the seat at the 1973 general election. At the 1977 general election, he was returned for Dublin County Mid, and after a further revision of constituency boundaries, he was elected as TD for Dublin South-West at the general elections in 1981 and February 1982. He lost his seat at the November 1982 general election.

From 1983 to 1992, he served as a member of Seanad Éireann, elected on the Labour Panel.

Dáil	Election	Deputy (Party)	Deputy (Party)	Deputy (Party)
19th	1969	Kevin Boland (FF)	Tom O'Higgins (FG)	Richard Burke (FG)
19th	1970 by-election	Larry McMahon (FG)	Tom O'Higgins (FG)	Richard Burke (FG)
20th	1973	Larry McMahon (FG)	Ruairí Brugha (FF)	Richard Burke (FG)
21st	1977	John Kelly (FG)	Niall Andrews (FF)	John Horgan (Lab)
22nd	1981	Constituency abolished. See Dublin South		

Dáil	Election	Deputy (Party)	Deputy (Party)	Deputy (Party)
21st	1977	Seán Walsh (FF)	Síle de Valera (FF)	Larry McMahon (FG)
22nd	1981	Constituency abolished		

Dáil	Election	Deputy (Party)	Deputy (Party)	Deputy (Party)	Deputy (Party)	Deputy (Party)
13th	1948	Seán MacBride (CnaP)	Peadar Doyle (FG)	Bernard Butler (FF)	Michael O'Higgins (FG)	Robert Briscoe (FF)
14th	1951	Seán MacBride (CnaP)	Peadar Doyle (FG)	Bernard Butler (FF)	Michael ffrench-O'Carroll (Ind.)	Robert Briscoe (FF)
15th	1954	Seán MacBride (CnaP)	Peadar Doyle (FG)	Bernard Butler (FF)	Michael O'Higgins (FG)	Robert Briscoe (FF)
15th	1956 by-election	Seán MacBride (CnaP)	Noel Lemass (FF)	Bernard Butler (FF)	Michael O'Higgins (FG)	Robert Briscoe (FF)
16th	1957	James Carroll (Ind.)	Noel Lemass (FF)	Bernard Butler (FF)	Michael O'Higgins (FG)	Robert Briscoe (FF)
16th	1959 by-election	James Carroll (Ind.)	Noel Lemass (FF)	Richie Ryan (FG)	Michael O'Higgins (FG)	Robert Briscoe (FF)
17th	1961	James Carroll (Ind.)	Noel Lemass (FF)	Richie Ryan (FG)	James O'Keeffe (FG)	Robert Briscoe (FF)
18th	1965	John O'Connell (Lab)	Noel Lemass (FF)	Richie Ryan (FG)	Joseph Dowling (FF)	Ben Briscoe (FF)
19th	1969	John O'Connell (Lab)	Noel Lemass (FF)	Seán Dunne (Lab)	Joseph Dowling (FF)	4 seats 1969–1977
19th	1970 by-election	John O'Connell (Lab)	Noel Lemass (FF)	Seán Sherwin (FF)	Joseph Dowling (FF)	4 seats 1969–1977
20th	1973	John O'Connell (Lab)	Noel Lemass (FF)	Declan Costello (FG)	Joseph Dowling (FF)	4 seats 1969–1977
20th	1976 by-election	John O'Connell (Lab)	Brendan Halligan (Lab)	Declan Costello (FG)	Joseph Dowling (FF)	4 seats 1969–1977
21st	1977	Constituency abolished. See Dublin Ballyfermot				

Dáil	Election	Deputy (Party)	Deputy (Party)	Deputy (Party)	Deputy (Party)	Deputy (Party)
22nd	1981	Seán Walsh (FF)	Larry McMahon (FG)	Mary Harney (FF)	Mervyn Taylor (Lab)	4 seats 1981–1992
23rd	1982 (Feb)	Seán Walsh (FF)	Larry McMahon (FG)	Mary Harney (FF)	Mervyn Taylor (Lab)	4 seats 1981–1992
24th	1982 (Nov)	Seán Walsh (FF)	Michael O'Leary (FG)	Mary Harney (FF)	Mervyn Taylor (Lab)	4 seats 1981–1992
25th	1987	Seán Walsh (FF)	Chris Flood (FF)	Mary Harney (PDs)	Mervyn Taylor (Lab)	4 seats 1981–1992
26th	1989	Pat Rabbitte (WP)	Chris Flood (FF)	Mary Harney (PDs)	Mervyn Taylor (Lab)	4 seats 1981–1992
27th	1992	Pat Rabbitte (DL)	Chris Flood (FF)	Mary Harney (PDs)	Mervyn Taylor (Lab)	Éamonn Walsh (Lab)
28th	1997	Pat Rabbitte (DL)	Chris Flood (FF)	Mary Harney (PDs)	Conor Lenihan (FF)	Brian Hayes (FG)
29th	2002	Pat Rabbitte (Lab)	Charlie O'Connor (FF)	Seán Crowe (SF)	Conor Lenihan (FF)	4 seats 2002–2016
30th	2007	Pat Rabbitte (Lab)	Charlie O'Connor (FF)	Brian Hayes (FG)	Conor Lenihan (FF)	4 seats 2002–2016
31st	2011	Pat Rabbitte (Lab)	Eamonn Maloney (Lab)	Brian Hayes (FG)	Seán Crowe (SF)	4 seats 2002–2016
31st	2014 by-election	Pat Rabbitte (Lab)	Eamonn Maloney (Lab)	Paul Murphy (AAA)	Seán Crowe (SF)	4 seats 2002–2016
32nd	2016	Colm Brophy (FG)	John Lahart (FF)	Paul Murphy (AAA–PBP)	Seán Crowe (SF)	Katherine Zappone (Ind.)
33rd	2020	Colm Brophy (FG)	John Lahart (FF)	Paul Murphy (S–PBP)	Seán Crowe (SF)	Francis Noel Duffy (GP)
34th	2024	Colm Brophy (FG)	John Lahart (FF)	Paul Murphy (PBP–S)	Seán Crowe (SF)	Ciarán Ahern (Lab)
