= Cornelius Desmond (Irish politician) =

Irish politician and trade unionist (1898–1974)

Senator
- In office 14 December 1961 – 23 June 1965
- Constituency: Administrative Panel

Personal details
- Born: 1898 Cork, Ireland
- Died: 31 October 1974 (aged 75–76) Cork, Ireland
- Party: Labour Party
- Children: Barry Desmond

Cornelius Desmond (1898 – 31 October 1974) was an Irish politician and trade union official. He was a Labour Party member of Seanad Éireann from 1961 to 1965 and Lord Mayor of Cork from 1965 to 1966. He was an unsuccessful candidate in a Dáil Éireann by-election on 2 August 1956 for the Cork Borough constituency. but was elected to the 10th Seanad in 1961 by the Administrative Panel. He lost his seat at the 1965 Seanad election.

His son, Barry Desmond, went on to have a prominent career as a Labour Party politician, serving as a cabinet minister, MEP, and member of the European Court of Auditors.

Civic offices
Preceded by Gus Healy	Lord Mayor of Cork; 1965–1966	Succeeded by Seán Casey
