= James Tully (Irish politician) =

Irish politician (1915–1992)

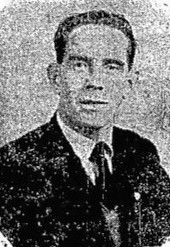
- Tully in 1954

Minister for Defence
- In office 30 June 1981 – 9 March 1982
- Taoiseach: Garret FitzGerald
- Preceded by: Sylvester Barrett
- Succeeded by: Paddy Power

Deputy leader of the Labour Party
- In office 1972 – 1 July 1977
- Leader: Brendan Corish
- Preceded by: Dan Desmond (1965)
- Succeeded by: Michael O'Leary
- In office 17 June 1981 – 22 February 1982
- Leader: Michael O'Leary
- Preceded by: Michael O'Leary
- Succeeded by: Barry Desmond

Minister for Local Government
- In office 14 March 1973 – 5 July 1977
- Taoiseach: Liam Cosgrave
- Preceded by: Bobby Molloy
- Succeeded by: Sylvester Barrett

Teachta Dála
- In office October 1961 – February 1982
- In office May 1954 – March 1957
- Constituency: Meath

Personal details
- Born: 18 September 1915 Kells, County Meath, Ireland
- Died: 20 May 1992 (aged 76) Navan, County Meath, Ireland
- Party: Labour Party
- Spouse: Mary O'Brien (m. 1942)
- Children: 5
- Education: St Patrick's Classical School

James Tully (18 September 1915 – 20 May 1992) was an Irish Labour Party politician and trade unionist. He served as Minister for Defence from 1981 to 1982, Deputy leader of the Labour Party from 1981 to 1982 and Minister for Local Government from 1973 to 1977. He served as a Teachta Dála (TD) for the Meath constituency from 1954 to 1957 and 1961 to 1982.

A native of Carlanstown, near Kells in the north of County Meath, Tully was educated in Carlanstown schools and in St Patrick's Classical School in Navan. He was elected to Dáil Éireann as a Labour Party TD for the Meath constituency at the 1954 general election. He lost his seat at the 1957 general election, but was re-elected at the 1961 general election and served until 1982. When Labour entered into a coalition government with Fine Gael in 1973, he was appointed Minister for Local Government. While serving in that post he gained prominence for a massive increase in the building of public housing, and notoriety for an attempt to gerrymander Irish constituencies to ensure the re-election of the National Coalition at the 1977 general election. His electoral reorganisation effort via the Electoral (Amendment) Act 1974, which came to be called a "Tullymander", backfired spectacularly and helped engineer a landslide for the opposition, Fianna Fáil. He was regarded as a conservative within the Labour Party, though tended to support party decisions, even if he disagreed with them. For many years he was opposed to coalition, though finding the years in opposition fruitless, he changed his mind and became increasingly in favour of coalition with Fine Gael.

Also as Minister for Local government, Tully decided on alterations to the plans for the controversial Dublin Corporation Civic Offices.

Tully was appointed deputy leader of the Labour Party under Michael O'Leary in 1981, and Minister for Defence in the short-lived 1981–82 Fine Gael-Labour Party government. In that capacity he traveled to Cairo, in 1981, as the Republic of Ireland's representative in Egypt's annual 6 October military victory parade. While in the reviewing stand, next to President Anwar Sadat, he suffered a shrapnel injury to his face when Sadat was assassinated by members of Egyptian Islamic Jihad who had infiltrated the Egyptian Army.

In 1982, a few months after the event, James Tully retired from politics. He died ten years later at the age of 76.

Political offices
Preceded by Bobby Molloy	Minister for Local Government; 1973–1977	Succeeded by Sylvester Barrett
Preceded by Sylvester Barrett	Minister for Defence; 1981–1982	Succeeded by Paddy Power
Trade union offices
Preceded by Séan Dunne	General Secretary of the Federation of Rural Workers; 1954–1970s	Succeeded by Paddy Murphy

Dáil	Election	Deputy (Party)	Deputy (Party)	Deputy (Party)
4th	1923	Patrick Mulvany (FP)	David Hall (Lab)	Eamonn Duggan (CnaG)
5th	1927 (Jun)	Matthew O'Reilly (FF)	David Hall (Lab)	Eamonn Duggan (CnaG)
6th	1927 (Sep)	Matthew O'Reilly (FF)	Arthur Matthews (CnaG)	Eamonn Duggan (CnaG)
7th	1932	James Kelly (FF)	Arthur Matthews (CnaG)	Eamonn Duggan (CnaG)
8th	1933	James Kelly (FF)	Robert Davitt (CnaG)	Matthew O'Reilly (FF)
9th	1937	Constituency abolished. See Meath–Westmeath		

Dáil	Election	Deputy (Party)	Deputy (Party)	Deputy (Party)	Deputy (Party)	Deputy (Party)
13th	1948	Matthew O'Reilly (FF)	Michael Hilliard (FF)	3 seats until 1977	Patrick Giles (FG)	3 seats until 1977
14th	1951	Matthew O'Reilly (FF)	Michael Hilliard (FF)	3 seats until 1977	Patrick Giles (FG)	3 seats until 1977
15th	1954	James Tully (Lab)	Michael Hilliard (FF)	3 seats until 1977	Patrick Giles (FG)	3 seats until 1977
16th	1957	James Griffin (FF)	Michael Hilliard (FF)	3 seats until 1977	Patrick Giles (FG)	3 seats until 1977
16th	1959 by-election	Henry Johnston (FF)	Michael Hilliard (FF)	3 seats until 1977	Patrick Giles (FG)	3 seats until 1977
17th	1961	James Tully (Lab)	Michael Hilliard (FF)	3 seats until 1977	Denis Farrelly (FG)	3 seats until 1977
18th	1965	James Tully (Lab)	Michael Hilliard (FF)	3 seats until 1977	Denis Farrelly (FG)	3 seats until 1977
19th	1969	James Tully (Lab)	Michael Hilliard (FF)	3 seats until 1977	John Bruton (FG)	3 seats until 1977
20th	1973	James Tully (Lab)	Brendan Crinion (FF)	3 seats until 1977	John Bruton (FG)	3 seats until 1977
21st	1977	James Tully (Lab)	Brendan Crinion (FF)	Jim Fitzsimons (FF)	John Bruton (FG)	4 seats 1977–1981
22nd	1981	James Tully (Lab)	Brendan Crinion (FF)	Jim Fitzsimons (FF)	John Bruton (FG)	John V. Farrelly (FG)
23rd	1982 (Feb)	Michael Lynch (FF)	Colm Hilliard (FF)	Jim Fitzsimons (FF)	John Bruton (FG)	John V. Farrelly (FG)
24th	1982 (Nov)	Frank McLoughlin (Lab)	Colm Hilliard (FF)	Jim Fitzsimons (FF)	John Bruton (FG)	John V. Farrelly (FG)
25th	1987	Michael Lynch (FF)	Colm Hilliard (FF)	Noel Dempsey (FF)	John Bruton (FG)	John V. Farrelly (FG)
26th	1989	Mary Wallace (FF)	Colm Hilliard (FF)	Noel Dempsey (FF)	John Bruton (FG)	John V. Farrelly (FG)
27th	1992	Mary Wallace (FF)	Colm Hilliard (FF)	Noel Dempsey (FF)	John Bruton (FG)	Brian Fitzgerald (Lab)
28th	1997	Mary Wallace (FF)	Johnny Brady (FF)	Noel Dempsey (FF)	John Bruton (FG)	John V. Farrelly (FG)
29th	2002	Mary Wallace (FF)	Johnny Brady (FF)	Noel Dempsey (FF)	John Bruton (FG)	Damien English (FG)
29th	2005 by-election	Mary Wallace (FF)	Johnny Brady (FF)	Noel Dempsey (FF)	Shane McEntee (FG)	Damien English (FG)
30th	2007	Constituency abolished. See Meath East and Meath West				
