= Dublin County South =

Dáil constituency (1969–1981)

- Former Dáil constituency

Former constituency
- Created: 1969
- Abolished: 1981
- Seats: 3
- Local government area: County Dublin
- Created from: Dublin County
- Replaced by: Dublin South

Dublin County South was a parliamentary constituency represented in Dáil Éireann, the lower house of the Irish parliament or Oireachtas from 1969 to 1981. The constituency elected three deputies (Teachtaí Dála, commonly known as TDs) to the Dáil, using proportional representation by means of the single transferable vote (PR-STV).

== History and boundaries ==
The constituency was created by the Electoral (Amendment) Act 1969, and first used at the 1969 general election. It was abolished by the Electoral (Amendment) Act 1980, with effect from the 1981 general election.

Changes to the constituency of Dublin County South, 1969–1981
| Years | TDs | Boundaries | Notes |
|---|---|---|---|
| 1969–1977 | 3 | In County Dublin the district electoral divisions (except any parts in the county borough of Dublin) of: Newcastle, Rathcoole, Saggart, in the former Rural District of Celbridge No. 2; Ballybrack (except the part thereof which is comprised in the constituency of Dun Laoghaire and Rathdown), Dundrum (except the part thereof which is comprised in the constituency of Dun Laoghaire and Rathdown), Glencullen, Milltown, Rathmichael (except the part thereof which is comprised in the constituency of Dun Laoghaire and Rathdown), in the former Rural District of Rathdown No. 1; Rathfarnham, Tallaght, Whitechurch, and the townland of Kimmage (except the part thereof comprised in the county borough of Dublin) in the district electoral division of Terenure, in the former Rural District of Dublin South. | Created from Dublin County |
| 1977–1981 | 3 | In County Dublin the district electoral divisions of Ballybrack Number One, Ballybrack Number Two, Dundrum Number Two, Dundrum Number Three, Dundrum Number Four, Dundrum Number Five, Glencullen, Milltown Number One, Milltown Number Two, Rathmichael; and that part of the district electoral division of Stillorgan Number One not contained in the constituency of Dún Laoghaire; and in County Wicklow, the district electoral divisions of Bray No. 1 and Rathmichael (Bray) | Transfer of Bray No. 1 and Rathmichael from Wicklow |
| 1981 | — | Constituency abolished | See Dublin South, Dún Laoghaire and Wicklow |

== TDs ==
Teachtaí Dála (TDs) for Dublin County South 1969–1981
Key to parties: FF = Fianna Fáil; FG = Fine Gael; Lab = Labour
| Dáil | Election | Deputy (Party) | Deputy (Party) | Deputy (Party) |
| 19th | 1969 | Kevin Boland (FF) | Tom O'Higgins (FG) | Richard Burke (FG) |
| 19th | 1970 by-election | Larry McMahon (FG) | Tom O'Higgins (FG) | Richard Burke (FG) |
| 20th | 1973 | Larry McMahon (FG) | Ruairí Brugha (FF) | Richard Burke (FG) |
| 21st | 1977 | John Kelly (FG) | Niall Andrews (FF) | John Horgan (Lab) |
| 22nd | 1981 | Constituency abolished. See Dublin South | | |

Note: The columns in this table are used only for presentational purposes, and no significance should be attached to the order of columns. For details of the order in which seats were won at each election, see the detailed results of that election.

== Elections ==
*: Outgoing TD

=== 1977 general election ===
1977 general election: Dublin County South
| Party | Candidate | FPv% | Count | | | | | | |
| Party | Candidate | FPv% | 1 | 2 | 3 | 4 | 5 | 6 | 7 |
|---|---|---|---|---|---|---|---|---|---|
| Fianna Fáil | Niall Andrews | 19.9 | 6,956 | 7,063 | 7,133 | 7,771 | 9,698 | | |
| Fine Gael | John Kelly | 15.3 | 5,355 | 5,452 | 6,282 | 6,866 | 6,971 | 10,241 | |
| Labour | John Horgan | 13.4 | 4,673 | 4,880 | 5,281 | 6,631 | 6,845 | 7,752 | 9,067 |
| Fianna Fáil | Ruairí Brugha | 11.6 | 4,037 | 4,112 | 4,148 | 4,506 | 6,356 | 6,514 | 6,714 |
| Fianna Fáil | James Murphy | 11.2 | 3,902 | 3,982 | 4,057 | 4,310 | | | |
| Independent | Nuala Fennell | 9.8 | 3,426 | 3,693 | 3,828 | | | | |
| Fine Gael | Seán Barrett | 9.5 | 3,331 | 3,384 | 4,126 | 4,536 | 4,631 | | |
| Fine Gael | Tom Hand | 6.5 | 2,258 | 2,357 | | | | | |
| Independent | Myles Tierney | 2.8 | 962 | | | | | | |
Electorate: 47,847 Valid: 34,900 Quota: 8,726 Turnout: 72.9%

=== 1973 general election ===
1973 general election: Dublin County South
| Party | Candidate | FPv% | Count | | | | | | | |
| Party | Candidate | FPv% | 1 | 2 | 3 | 4 | 5 | 6 | 7 | 8 |
|---|---|---|---|---|---|---|---|---|---|---|
| Fine Gael | Richard Burke | 26.1 | 9,104 | | | | | | | |
| Fianna Fáil | Ruairí Brugha | 18.2 | 6,361 | 6,366 | 6,910 | 7,271 | 7,328 | 7,375 | 7,579 | 8,043 |
| Fianna Fáil | James Murphy | 12.5 | 4,345 | 4,349 | 5,541 | 5,733 | 5,802 | 5,861 | 6,052 | 6,574 |
| Fine Gael | Larry McMahon | 10.4 | 3,627 | 3,758 | 3,833 | 4,157 | 5,982 | 6,639 | 10,735 | |
| Labour | Mervyn Taylor | 8.8 | 3,083 | 3,105 | 3,155 | 3,535 | 3,834 | 5,769 | | |
| Labour | Malachi Burke | 6.2 | 2,169 | 2,196 | 2,215 | 2,625 | 2,866 | | | |
| Aontacht Éireann | Kevin Boland | 6.2 | 2,142 | 2,148 | 2,178 | | | | | |
| Fine Gael | Donal Lowry | 6.0 | 2,103 | 2,289 | 2,309 | 2,558 | | | | |
| Fianna Fáil | Damien Murray | 5.6 | 1,950 | 1,951 | | | | | | |
Electorate: 45,289 Valid: 34,884 Quota: 8,722 Turnout: 77.0%

†: Burke resigned his seat on 25 January 1977. The seat remained vacant until the dissolution of the 20th Dáil on 25 May 1977.

=== 1970 by-election ===
Following the resignation of Fianna Fáil TD Kevin Boland, a by-election was held on 2 December 1970. The seat was won by the Fine Gael candidate Larry McMahon.

1970 by-election: Dublin County South
| Party | Candidate | FPv% | Count | | | |
| Party | Candidate | FPv% | 1 | 2 | 3 | 4 |
|---|---|---|---|---|---|---|
| Fine Gael | Larry McMahon | 38.3 | 9,549 | 9,679 | 10,984 | 14,098 |
| Fianna Fáil | James Murphy | 33.3 | 8,293 | 8,356 | 9,044 | 9,709 |
| Labour | Donal O'Sullivan | 13.8 | 3,449 | 3,485 | 4,586 | |
| Independent | Joseph MacAnthony | 12.7 | 3,169 | 3,377 | | |
| Independent | James T. Deegan | 1.9 | 462 | | | |
Electorate: 40,216 Valid: 24,922 Quota: 12,462 Turnout: 61.9%

=== 1969 general election ===
1969 general election: Dublin County South
| Party | Candidate | FPv% | Count | | | | | | |
| Party | Candidate | FPv% | 1 | 2 | 3 | 4 | 5 | 6 | 7 |
|---|---|---|---|---|---|---|---|---|---|
| Fine Gael | Tom O'Higgins | 22.2 | 6,243 | 6305 | 6389 | 6489 | 7,665 | | |
| Fianna Fáil | Kevin Boland | 19.3 | 5,441 | 5,458 | 5,485 | 6,293 | 6,384 | 6,370 | 6,542 |
| Fine Gael | Richard Burke | 12.9 | 3,623 | 3,648 | 3,697 | 3,793 | 4,795 | 5,367 | 6,878 |
| Fianna Fáil | Ruairí Brugha | 11.9 | 3,338 | 3,352 | 3,393 | 4,483 | 4,592 | 4,606 | 4,921 |
| Fine Gael | Pearse Morris | 8.3 | 2,344 | 2,361 | 2,484 | 2,567 | | | |
| Labour | Donal O'Sullivan | 8.2 | 2,300 | 2,631 | 4,368 | 4,421 | 4,490 | 4,523 | |
| Fianna Fáil | James Murphy | 7.9 | 2,224 | 2,240 | 2,288 | | | | |
| Labour | Seán Fitzpatrick | 6.4 | 1,814 | 2,144 | | | | | |
| Labour | Thomas O'Brien | 2.9 | 830 | | | | | | |
Electorate: 38,614 Valid: 28,157 Quota: 7,040 Turnout: 72.9%

‡: Boland resigned his seat on 4 November 1970

== See also ==
- Dáil constituencies
- Politics of the Republic of Ireland
- Historic Dáil constituencies
- Elections in the Republic of Ireland
