= Gene Fitzgerald =

Irish politician (1932–2007)

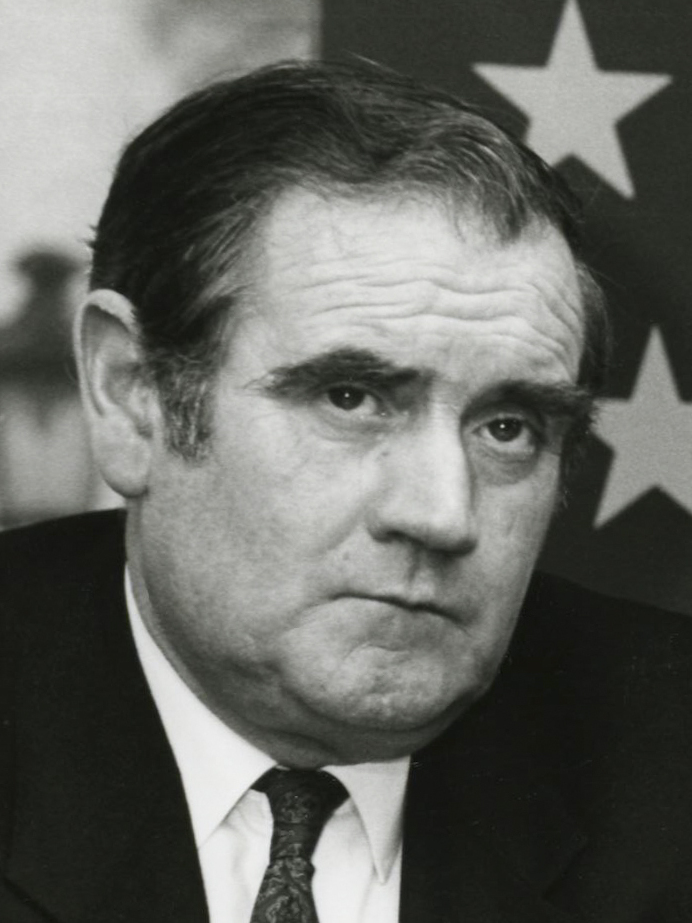
- Fitzgerald in 1983

Minister for Finance
- In office 16 December 1980 – 30 June 1981
- Taoiseach: Charles Haughey
- Preceded by: Michael O'Kennedy
- Succeeded by: John Bruton

Minister for the Public Service
- In office 9 March 1982 – 14 December 1982
- Taoiseach: Charles Haughey
- Preceded by: Michael O'Kennedy
- Succeeded by: Liam Kavanagh
- In office 24 March 1980 – 30 June 1981
- Taoiseach: Charles Haughey
- Preceded by: Liam Kavanagh
- Succeeded by: John Boland

Minister for Labour
- In office 9 March 1982 – 14 December 1982
- Taoiseach: Charles Haughey
- Preceded by: Liam Kavanagh
- Succeeded by: Liam Kavanagh
- In office 5 July 1977 – 16 December 1980
- Taoiseach: Jack Lynch; Charles Haughey
- Preceded by: Liam Kavanagh
- Succeeded by: Liam Kavanagh

Member of the European Parliament
- In office 1 July 1984 – 20 May 1994
- Constituency: Munster

Teachta Dála
- In office June 1981 – June 1987
- Constituency: Cork South-Central
- In office August 1972 – June 1981
- Constituency: Cork Mid

Personal details
- Born: Eugene Fitzgerald; 21 August 1932 Crookstown, County Cork, Ireland
- Died: 14 December 2007 (aged 75) Cork, Ireland
- Party: Fianna Fáil
- Spouse: Noreen Lucy (m. 1961)
- Children: 5
- Education: Presentation Brothers College

Eugene Fitzgerald (21 August 1932 – 14 December 2007) was an Irish Fianna Fáil politician who served as Minister for Finance from 1980 to 1981, Minister for the Public Service from 1980 to 1981 to March 1982 to December 1982, Minister for Labour from 1977 to 1980 and March 1982 to December 1982. He served as a Teachta Dála (TD) from 1972 to 1987. He was a Member of the European Parliament (MEP) for the Munster constituency from 1984 to 1994.

Gene Fitzgerald was born in Crookstown, County Cork in August 1932. He was educated nearby in Cork at the Presentation Brothers College. Fitzgerald was first elected to Dáil Éireann in a by-election in 1972. He remained as a Fianna Fáil TD for the constituency of Cork South-Central for 15 years. He was also involved in local politics, serving as a member of Cork County Council from 1974 until 1977. Fitzgerald was also vice-president of the Cork County Board of the Gaelic Athletic Association.

Fitzgerald was first appointed to the Irish Government in 1977 when he became minister for labour under Jack Lynch. He backed George Colley in the 1979 Fianna Fáil leadership election but retained his office under the eventual victor, Charles Haughey. His appointment as minister for finance in 1980 caused some political commentators to be taken aback, particularly because of his political inexperience and also Fitzgerald had never been named as a possible finance minister. From then on he backed Haughey in the leadership heaves of 1982. In Haughey's second government, Fitzgerald returned to the position of minister for labour.

Fitzgerald contested the 1984 European election in the Munster constituency and won a seat. He remained a TD until he stood down at the 1987 general election to concentrate on European politics instead of national politics. He was re-elected as an MEP in the 1989 elections. Fitzgerald retired from public office at the 1994 election, although he remained involved in the Fianna Fáil party as a treasurer and subsequently as honorary secretary.

Political offices
| Preceded by Michael O'Leary | Minister for Labour; 1977–1980 | Succeeded by Tom Nolan |
| Preceded by Michael O'Kennedy | Minister for Finance; 1980–1981 | Succeeded by John Bruton |
| Preceded by Michael O'Kennedy | Minister for the Public Service; 1980–1981 | Succeeded by Liam Kavanagh |
| Preceded by Liam Kavanagh | Minister for Labour; 1982 | Succeeded by Liam Kavanagh |
| Preceded by Liam Kavanagh | Minister for the Public Service; 1982 | Succeeded by John Boland |

| Dáil | Election | Deputy (Party) | Deputy (Party) | Deputy (Party) | Deputy (Party) | Deputy (Party) |
|---|---|---|---|---|---|---|
| 17th | 1961 | Dan Desmond (Lab) | Seán McCarthy (FF) | Con Meaney (FF) | Denis J. O'Sullivan (FG) | 4 seats 1961–1977 |
| 17th | 1965 by-election | Eileen Desmond (Lab) | Seán McCarthy (FF) | Con Meaney (FF) | Denis J. O'Sullivan (FG) | 4 seats 1961–1977 |
| 18th | 1965 | Eileen Desmond (Lab) | Flor Crowley (FF) | Thomas Meaney (FF) | Donal Creed (FG) | 4 seats 1961–1977 |
| 19th | 1969 | Philip Burton (FG) | Paddy Forde (FF) | Thomas Meaney (FF) | Donal Creed (FG) | 4 seats 1961–1977 |
| 19th | 1972 by-election | Philip Burton (FG) | Gene Fitzgerald (FF) | Thomas Meaney (FF) | Donal Creed (FG) | 4 seats 1961–1977 |
| 20th | 1973 | Eileen Desmond (Lab) | Gene Fitzgerald (FF) | Thomas Meaney (FF) | Donal Creed (FG) | 4 seats 1961–1977 |
| 21st | 1977 | Eileen Desmond (Lab) | Gene Fitzgerald (FF) | Thomas Meaney (FF) | Donal Creed (FG) | Barry Cogan (FF) |
| 22nd | 1981 | Constituency abolished. See Cork North-Central and Cork South-Central | | | | |

| Dáil | Election | Deputy (Party) | Deputy (Party) | Deputy (Party) | Deputy (Party) | Deputy (Party) |
|---|---|---|---|---|---|---|
| 22nd | 1981 | Eileen Desmond (Lab) | Gene Fitzgerald (FF) | Pearse Wyse (FF) | Hugh Coveney (FG) | Peter Barry (FG) |
| 23rd | 1982 (Feb) | Eileen Desmond (Lab) | Gene Fitzgerald (FF) | Pearse Wyse (FF) | Jim Corr (FG) | Peter Barry (FG) |
| 24th | 1982 (Nov) | Eileen Desmond (Lab) | Gene Fitzgerald (FF) | Pearse Wyse (FF) | Hugh Coveney (FG) | Peter Barry (FG) |
| 25th | 1987 | Toddy O'Sullivan (Lab) | John Dennehy (FF) | Batt O'Keeffe (FF) | Pearse Wyse (PDs) | Peter Barry (FG) |
| 26th | 1989 | Toddy O'Sullivan (Lab) | John Dennehy (FF) | Micheál Martin (FF) | Pearse Wyse (PDs) | Peter Barry (FG) |
| 27th | 1992 | Toddy O'Sullivan (Lab) | Batt O'Keeffe (FF) | Micheál Martin (FF) | Pat Cox (PDs) | Peter Barry (FG) |
| 27th | 1994 by-election | Toddy O'Sullivan (Lab) | Batt O'Keeffe (FF) | Micheál Martin (FF) | Hugh Coveney (FG) | Peter Barry (FG) |
| 28th | 1997 | John Dennehy (FF) | Batt O'Keeffe (FF) | Micheál Martin (FF) | Hugh Coveney (FG) | Deirdre Clune (FG) |
| 28th | 1998 by-election | John Dennehy (FF) | Batt O'Keeffe (FF) | Micheál Martin (FF) | Simon Coveney (FG) | Deirdre Clune (FG) |
| 29th | 2002 | John Dennehy (FF) | Batt O'Keeffe (FF) | Micheál Martin (FF) | Simon Coveney (FG) | Dan Boyle (GP) |
| 30th | 2007 | Ciarán Lynch (Lab) | Michael McGrath (FF) | Micheál Martin (FF) | Simon Coveney (FG) | Deirdre Clune (FG) |
| 31st | 2011 | Ciarán Lynch (Lab) | Michael McGrath (FF) | Micheál Martin (FF) | Simon Coveney (FG) | Jerry Buttimer (FG) |
| 32nd | 2016 | Donnchadh Ó Laoghaire (SF) | Michael McGrath (FF) | Micheál Martin (FF) | Simon Coveney (FG) | 4 seats 2016–2024 |
| 33rd | 2020 | Donnchadh Ó Laoghaire (SF) | Michael McGrath (FF) | Micheál Martin (FF) | Simon Coveney (FG) | 4 seats 2016–2024 |
| 34th | 2024 | Donnchadh Ó Laoghaire (SF) | Séamus McGrath (FF) | Micheál Martin (FF) | Jerry Buttimer (FG) | Pádraig Rice (SD) |
