= Aontacht Éireann =

- Founder: Kevin Boland
- Founded: 1971; 55 years ago
- Dissolved: 1984; 42 years ago
- Ideology: Irish republicanism

Aontacht Éireann (Irish pronunciation: [ˈeːn̪ˠt̪ˠəxt̪ˠ ˈeːɾʲən̪ˠ]; English: "Irish Unity") was an Irish political party founded by Kevin Boland, a former Fianna Fáil government minister and advocate of Irish republicanism. The party mainly operated within the Republic of Ireland.

Boland resigned from Dáil Éireann on 3 November 1970 rather than support a motion of confidence in Taoiseach Jack Lynch, who had sacked ministers Neil Blaney and Charles Haughey for their refusal to support Government policy on Northern Ireland amid allegations of misuse of aid to Northern Ireland during the Arms Crisis. In May 1971, Boland resigned from Fianna Fáil; on 19 September 1971, he launched the new party before an audience of over one thousand delegates.

Seán Sherwin, Fianna Fáil TD for Dublin South-West, was the only serving member of the Dáil to join Aontacht Éireann. Sherwin would later return to Fianna Fáil and serve as its National Organiser. Boland tried to persuade Fianna Fáil dissidents Neil Blaney, Paudge Brennan and Des Foley to join his party, but they remained within Fianna Fáil, contesting the 1973 general election as independents. Captain James Kelly, who was implicated and then cleared in the Arms Trial, became vice-chairman of Aontacht Éireann.

The party supported Northern Ireland's republicans more vehemently than Fianna Fáil. It was described by Boland as "a return to what Fianna Fáil was when it was set up to subvert the Free State". Boland declared that "armed resistance was justified" and that "the enemy of the Irish people is still the same enemy that was successfully engaged in places like Crossbarry and Kilmichael - and co-operation with that enemy at present operating in the Six Counties means the same thing now as it did then".

At the 1973 general election, Boland, Sherwin and eleven other candidates stood for Dáil Éireann under the Aontacht Éireann banner. None was successful and the party received less than 1% of the total national vote. Boland himself won only 6% of the vote in his constituency, Dublin County South. The party briefly had local representation, with Gerry Carroll serving as a member of Cork City Council.

Boland and most of the original members of the party resigned in 1976 after it was taken over by a number of far-right individuals. The party was essentially defunct by the time it was formally wound up in 1984.
