= 2009 Cork County Council election =

Part of the 2009 Irish local elections

| ← 2004 | 5 June 2009 | 2014 → |

All 48 seats on Cork County Council
| | First party | Second party | Third party |
|---|---|---|---|
| Party | Fine Gael | Fianna Fáil | Labour |
| Seats won | 22 | 12 | 7 |
| Seat change | ▼2 | ▼4 | ▲2 |
| Popular vote | 61,025 | 54,030 | 16,729 |
| Percentage | 37.19% | 32.93% | 10.19% |
| | Fourth party | Fifth party |
| Party | Sinn Féin | Independent |
| Seats won | 1 | 6 |
| Seat change | Steady | ▲4 |
| Popular vote | 10,079 | 13,059 |
| Percentage | 6.14% | 7.96% |
- Map showing the area of Cork County Council

An election to Cork County Council took place on 5 June 2009 as part of that year's Irish local elections. 48 councillors were elected from ten local electoral areas (LEAs) for a five-year term of office on the electoral system of proportional representation by means of the single transferable vote (PR-STV).

== Results by party ==
| Party | Seats | ± | First Pref. votes | FPv% | ±% |
|---|---|---|---|---|---|
| Fine Gael | 22 | ▼2 | 61,025 | 37.19 | |
| Fianna Fáil | 12 | ▼4 | 54,030 | 32.93 | |
| Labour | 7 | ▲2 | 16,729 | 10.19 | |
| Sinn Féin | 1 | Steady | 10,079 | 6.14 | |
| Independent | 6 | ▲4 | 13,059 | 7.96 | |
| Totals | 48 | - | 164,093 | 100.00 | — |

== Results by local electoral area ==
=== Bandon ===
Bandon - 3 seats
| Party | Candidate | FPv% | Count | | | | |
| Party | Candidate | FPv% | 1 | 2 | 3 | 4 | 5 |
|---|---|---|---|---|---|---|---|
| Fianna Fáil | Alan Coleman* | 25.65 | 3,370 | | | | |
| Fine Gael | Kevin Murphy* | 23.46 | 3,106 | 3,130 | 3,553 | | |
| Fine Gael | Veronica Neville* | 19.27 | 2,531 | 2,564 | 2,831 | 3,005 | 3,050 |
| Labour | Gearoid Buckley | 16.95 | 2,226 | 2,300 | 2,861 | 2,955 | 2,995 |
| Sinn Féin | Rachel McCarthy | 7.45 | 979 | 1,011 | | | |
| Independent | Edmund Butler | 5.03 | 661 | 715 | | | |
| Independent | Festus Asemota | 2.00 | 263 | | | | |
Electorate: 22,126 Valid: 13,136 (59.37%) Spoilt: 175 Quota: 3,285 Turnout: 13,311 (60.16%)

=== Bantry ===
Bantry - 5 seats
| Party | Candidate | FPv% | Count | | | | | | |
| Party | Candidate | FPv% | 1 | 2 | 3 | 4 | 5 | 6 | 7 |
|---|---|---|---|---|---|---|---|---|---|
| Fianna Fáil | Danny Crowley* | 15.68 | 1,889 | 1,914 | 1,924 | 1,970 | 2,062 | | |
| Fine Gael | Mary Hegarty | 15.16 | 1,827 | 1,846 | 1,923 | 2,038 | | | |
| Fine Gael | Dermot Sheehan* | 14.16 | 1,706 | 1,729 | 1,803 | 1,838 | 1,928 | 1,932 | 2,206 |
| Fianna Fáil | Patrick Murphy* | 12.38 | 1,491 | 1,509 | 1,517 | 1,555 | 1,657 | 1,673 | 2,065 |
| Fine Gael | Noel Harrington* | 11.95 | 1,440 | 1,484 | 1,509 | 1,537 | 1,617 | 1,629 | 1,691 |
| Fine Gael | John P. O'Shea* | 8.08 | 973 | 979 | 997 | 1,050 | 1,182 | 1,189 | 1,239 |
| Fianna Fáil | Michael Kingston | 7.51 | 905 | 924 | 948 | 981 | 1,051 | 1,065 | |
| Independent | Anne O'Leary | 5.28 | 636 | 690 | 756 | 871 | | | |
| Independent | Joe Burke | 3.85 | 464 | 497 | 524 | | | | |
| Labour | Jose Ospina | 3.24 | 390 | 427 | | | | | |
| Sinn Féin | Sam Simpson | 1.63 | 196 | | | | | | |
| Independent | Michael O'Sullivan | 0.88 | 106 | | | | | | |
| Independent | Mecky McBrearty | 0.21 | 25 | | | | | | |
Electorate: 18,616 Valid: 12,048 (64.72%) Spoilt: 152 Quota: 2,009 Turnout: 12,200 (65.54%)

=== Blarney ===
Blarney - 4 seats
| Party | Candidate | FPv% | Count | | | |
| Party | Candidate | FPv% | 1 | 2 | 3 | 4 |
|---|---|---|---|---|---|---|
| Labour | John Gilroy* | 24.10 | 4,538 | | | |
| Fine Gael | Pat Burton | 19.50 | 3,671 | 3,772 | | |
| Fine Gael | Gerry Kelly* | 18.82 | 3,543 | 3,911 | | |
| Fianna Fáil | Dan Fleming* | 13.28 | 2,520 | 2,544 | 2,621 | 3,512 |
| Independent | Kevin Conway | 10.82 | 2,038 | 2,136 | 2,768 | 2,990 |
| Fianna Fáil | Michael Burns | 7.60 | 1,431 | 1,515 | 1,584 | |
| Sinn Féin | John Stanton | 5.77 | 1,087 | 1,184 | | |
Electorate: 34,580 Valid: 18,828 (54.45%) Spoilt: 234 Quota: 3,766 Turnout: 19,062 (55.12%)

=== Carrigaline ===
Carrigaline - 6 seats
| Party | Candidate | FPv% | Count | | | | | | | | |
| Party | Candidate | FPv% | 1 | 2 | 3 | 4 | 5 | 6 | 7 | 8 | 9 |
|---|---|---|---|---|---|---|---|---|---|---|---|
| Fianna Fáil | Séamus McGrath* | 17.00 | 3,996 | | | | | | | | |
| Fine Gael | Deirdre Forde* | 16.83 | 3,956 | | | | | | | | |
| Fine Gael | Tim Lombard* | 14.30 | 3,363 | | | | | | | | |
| Fine Gael | John A. Collins* | 12.35 | 2,904 | 2,975 | 3,119 | 3,243 | 3,336 | 3,342 | 4,003 | | |
| Labour | Paula Desmond* | 11.87 | 2,791 | 2,868 | 2,975 | 3,097 | 3,379 | | | | |
| Sinn Féin | Donnchadh O Laoghaire | 6.39 | 1,502 | 1,534 | 1,559 | 1,602 | 1,645 | 1,646 | 1,769 | 1,815 | 2,039 |
| Independent | David Boyle | 5.08 | 1,194 | 1,222 | 1,273 | 1,492 | 1,610 | 1,616 | 1,816 | 2,009 | 2,410 |
| Fianna Fáil | Padraig Martin | 5.08 | 1,194 | 1,523 | 1,572 | 1,607 | 1,667 | 1,669 | 1,741 | 1,784 | |
| Fine Gael | David O'Byrne | 4.41 | 1,038 | 1,079 | 1,263 | 1,301 | 1,426 | 1,431 | | | |
| Green | Dominick Donnelly | 3.45 | 810 | 842 | 866 | 907 | | | | | |
| Independent | Maurice Coveney | 2.33 | 547 | 563 | 572 | | | | | | |
| Independent | Maurice Fitzgerald | 0.92 | 216 | 227 | 231 | | | | | | |
Electorate: 56,644 Valid: 23,511 (49.75%) Spoilt: 328 Quota: 3,359 Turnout: 23,839 (50.44%)

=== Fermoy ===
Fermoy - 4 seats
| Party | Candidate | FPv% | Count | | | | | |
| Party | Candidate | FPv% | 1 | 2 | 3 | 4 | 5 | 6 |
|---|---|---|---|---|---|---|---|---|
| Fine Gael | Pa O'Driscoll | 18.98 | 2,559 | 2,638 | 2,689 | 2,735 | | |
| Fianna Fáil | Kevin O'Keeffe* | 18.72 | 2,524 | 2,548 | 2,616 | 2,777 | | |
| Labour | Noel McCarthy | 15.30 | 2,063 | 2,151 | 2,371 | 2,565 | 2,784 | |
| Fianna Fáil | Frank O'Flynn* | 14.47 | 1,952 | 1,992 | 2,056 | 2,157 | 2,361 | 2,390 |
| Fine Gael | Kay Dawson | 9.81 | 1,323 | 1,354 | 1,400 | 1,659 | 2,198 | 2,255 |
| Fine Gael | Aileen Pyne* | 8.35 | 1,126 | 1,161 | 1,190 | 1,223 | | |
| Independent | Tim White | 6.83 | 921 | 953 | 1,029 | | | |
| Sinn Féin | Seamus Coleman | 4.67 | 630 | 655 | | | | |
| Independent | Peter Merrigan | 2.88 | 388 | | | | | |
Electorate: 23,232 Valid: 13,486 (58.05%) Spoilt: 244 Quota: 2,698 Turnout: 13,671 (58.85%)

=== Kanturk ===
Kanturk - 4 seats
| Party | Candidate | FPv% | Count | | | | | | |
| Party | Candidate | FPv% | 1 | 2 | 3 | 4 | 5 | 6 | 7 |
|---|---|---|---|---|---|---|---|---|---|
| Independent | Timmy Collins | 22.64 | 3,343 | | | | | | |
| Fine Gael | Gerard Murphy | 17.11 | 2,526 | 2,585 | 2,693 | 3,073 | | | |
| Fine Gael | Noel Buckley* | 13.04 | 1,925 | 2,049 | 2,096 | 2,224 | 2,264 | 3,086 | |
| Fianna Fáil | Marie (The Shamrock) Murphy* | 12.94 | 1,911 | 1,994 | 2,060 | 2,179 | 2,207 | 2,273 | 2,316 |
| Fianna Fáil | Mike Donegan* | 11.57 | 1,708 | 1,735 | 1,771 | 1,926 | 1,942 | 2,341 | 2,430 |
| Fine Gael | Paul Cagney | 10.77 | 1,591 | 1,750 | 1,801 | 1,890 | 1,908 | 2,125 | |
| Labour | Ted Linehan | 7.98 | 1,178 | 1,302 | 1,404 | | | | |
| Labour | Donal Kelleher | 3.43 | 507 | | | | | | |
| Independent | Jimmy Fitzgerald | 0.52 | 77 | | | | | | |
Electorate: 23,463 Valid: 14,766 (62.93%) Spoilt: 242 Quota: 2,954 Turnout: 15,088 (63.96%)

=== Macroom ===
Macroom - 4 seats
| Party | Candidate | FPv% | Count | | | | | |
| Party | Candidate | FPv% | 1 | 2 | 3 | 4 | 5 | 6 |
|---|---|---|---|---|---|---|---|---|
| Fine Gael | Michael Creed* | 21.74 | 4,655 | | | | | |
| Fine Gael | Derry Canty* | 18.90 | 4,046 | 4,234 | 4,484 | | | |
| Fianna Fáil | Aindrias Moynihan* | 17.01 | 3,642 | 3,704 | 3,768 | 3,780 | 3,939 | 4,361 |
| Labour | Martin Coughlan* | 13.53 | 2,897 | 2,963 | 3,206 | 3,308 | 3,841 | 4,608 |
| Fianna Fáil | Mark O'Keeffe* | 11.20 | 2,397 | 2,404 | 2,495 | 2,536 | 2,679 | 2,811 |
| Independent | Jerry O'Sullivan | 6.94 | 1,486 | 1,519 | 1,629 | 1,663 | 1,973 | |
| Sinn Féin | Des O'Grady | 6.45 | 1,381 | 1,392 | 1,451 | 1,459 | | |
| Green | Mark Collins | 4.23 | 905 | 911 | | | | |
Electorate: 35,012 Valid: 21,409 (61.15%) Spoilt: 240 Quota: 4,282 Turnout: 21,649 (61.83%)

=== Mallow ===
Mallow - 5 seats
| Party | Candidate | FPv% | Count | | | | | | |
| Party | Candidate | FPv% | 1 | 2 | 3 | 4 | 5 | 6 | 7 |
|---|---|---|---|---|---|---|---|---|---|
| Fianna Fáil | Dan Joe Fitzgerald* | 13.69 | 2,034 | 2,066 | 2,360 | 2,423 | 2,520 | | |
| Independent | John Paul O'Shea | 12.51 | 1,859 | 1,959 | 2,029 | 2,190 | 2,382 | 2,546 | |
| Fine Gael | Tom Barry | 11.21 | 1,666 | 1,690 | 1,729 | 2,021 | 2,087 | 2,229 | 2,267 |
| Fine Gael | Tom Sheahan* | 11.08 | 1,646 | 1,684 | 1,719 | 1,807 | 1,958 | 2,068 | 2,100 |
| Fine Gael | Noel O'Connor* | 10.92 | 1,622 | 1,650 | 1,685 | 1,828 | 1,959 | 2,305 | 2,351 |
| Labour | Jerry Mullally* | 9.83 | 1,461 | 1,492 | 1,512 | 1,549 | 1,751 | | |
| Labour | Ronan Sheehan | 9.39 | 1,395 | 1,440 | 1,495 | 1,538 | 1,857 | 2,593 | |
| Sinn Féin | Willie O'Regan | 8.44 | 1,254 | 1,298 | 1,343 | 1,374 | | | |
| Fine Gael | Anthony Ahern | 5.87 | 872 | 882 | 892 | | | | |
| Fianna Fáil | Trish O'Dea | 4.38 | 650 | 661 | | | | | |
| Independent | Eddie Finn | 2.67 | 397 | | | | | | |
Electorate: 24,536 Valid: 14,856 (60.55%) Spoilt: 211 Quota: 2,477 Turnout: 15,067 (61.41%)

=== Midleton ===
Midleton - 6 seats
| Party | Candidate | FPv% | Count | | | | | | | |
| Party | Candidate | FPv% | 1 | 2 | 3 | 4 | 5 | 6 | 7 | 8 |
|---|---|---|---|---|---|---|---|---|---|---|
| Fine Gael | Michael Hegarty* | 14.61 | 3,591 | | | | | | | |
| Independent | Noel Collins* | 13.27 | 3,262 | 3,399 | 3,421 | 3,425 | 3,466 | 3,477 | 3,649 | |
| Labour | John Mulvihill* | 13.05 | 3,208 | 3,369 | 3,617 | | | | | |
| Sinn Féin | Sandra McLellan | 10.04 | 2,467 | 2,528 | 2,551 | 2,553 | 2,897 | 2,901 | 3,018 | 3,230 |
| Fine Gael | Barbara Murray* | 8.35 | 2,053 | 2,120 | 2,144 | 2,148 | 2,366 | 2,398 | 3,014 | 3,407 |
| Independent | Seán O'Connor | 8.33 | 2,048 | 2,072 | 2,283 | 2,339 | 2,348 | 2,349 | 2,631 | 2,941 |
| Independent | Ted Murphy | 7.67 | 1,884 | 1,990 | 2,001 | 2,004 | 2,048 | 2,059 | 2,184 | |
| Fianna Fáil | Maurice Ahern* | 8.23 | 1,778 | 1,820 | 1,949 | 1,958 | 2,261 | 2,266 | 2,355 | 2,685 |
| Fine Gael | Sinead Sheppard | 6.17 | 1,516 | 1,611 | 1,687 | 1,711 | 1,750 | 1,765 | | |
| Fianna Fáil | Mary Linehan Foley | 4.29 | 1,055 | 1,070 | 1,164 | 1,167 | | | | |
| Fianna Fáil | Michael Martin | 3.67 | 902 | 922 | | | | | | |
| Green | Malachy Harty | 3.32 | 815 | | | | | | | |
Electorate: 46,820 Valid: 24,579 (52.50%) Spoilt: 347 Quota: 3,512 Turnout: 24,926 (53.24%)

=== Skibbereen ===
Skibbereen - 7 seats
| Party | Candidate | FPv% | Count | | | | | | | |
| Party | Candidate | FPv% | 1 | 2 | 3 | 4 | 5 | 6 | 7 | 8 |
|---|---|---|---|---|---|---|---|---|---|---|
| Fine Gael | Jim Daly* | 14.90 | 2,739 | | | | | | | |
| Independent | Declan Hurley | 11.93 | 2,193 | 2,238 | 2,297 | 2,474 | | | | |
| Fianna Fáil | Donal O'Rourke* | 9.51 | 1,749 | 1,795 | 1,831 | 1,909 | 1,917 | 1,932 | 1,963 | 2,139 |
| Fine Gael | John O'Sullivan | 9.28 | 1,706 | 1,785 | 1,838 | 1,842 | 1,845 | 1,866 | 2,094 | 2,261 |
| Fianna Fáil | Christopher O'Sullivan* | 8.34 | 1,534 | 1,570 | 1,611 | 1,717 | 1,738 | 1,793 | 1,870 | 2,065 |
| Fine Gael | Adrian Healy | 7.69 | 1,413 | 1,491 | 1,563 | 1,566 | 1,566 | 1,814 | 2,138 | 2,195 |
| Fianna Fáil | Joe Carroll* | 7.44 | 1,368 | 1,387 | 1,415 | 1,571 | 1,604 | 1,746 | 1,839 | 1,900 |
| Labour | Brendan Leahy' | 7.25 | 1,333 | 1,365 | 1,497 | 1,516 | 1,522 | 1,846 | 1,946 | 2,265 |
| Sinn Féin | Cionnaith O Suilleabhain | 6.20 | 1,139 | 1,169 | 1,254 | 1,272 | 1,277 | 1,335 | 1,371 | |
| Fine Gael | John Collins* | 5.18 | 952 | 1,004 | 1,024 | 1,112 | 1,149 | 1,165 | | |
| Independent | John Kearney | 4.91 | 903 | 913 | 992 | 996 | 1,001 | | | |
| Fianna Fáil | T.J. O'Farrell | 3.79 | 697 | 701 | 709 | | | | | |
| Green | Declan Waugh | 3.58 | 658 | 667 | | | | | | |
Electorate: 27,937 Valid: 18,384 (65.81%) Spoilt: 262 Quota: 2,299 Turnout: 18,646 (66.74%)
