= John Mulvihill =

John Mulvihill may refer to:

- John Mulvihill (politician) (born 1945), Irish Labour Party politician
- John Mulvihill (rugby union) (born 1966), Australian rugby coach
