= Pat Buckley (Irish politician) =

Irish politician (born 1969)

Pat Buckley TD
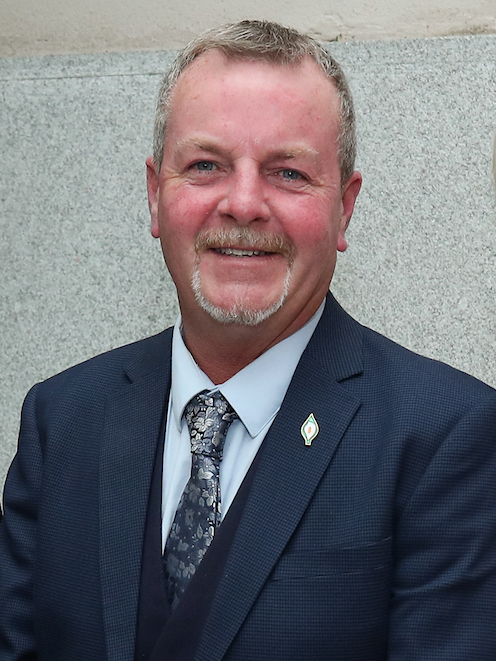
- Buckley in 2023

Teachta Dála
- Incumbent
- Assumed office February 2016
- Constituency: Cork East

Personal details
- Born: 10 February 1969 (age 57) Midleton, County Cork, Ireland
- Party: Sinn Féin
- Spouse: Sandra Buckley
- Children: 2
- Education: Cork Institute of Technology

Pat Buckley (born 10 February 1969) is an Irish Sinn Féin politician who has been a Teachta Dála (TD) for the Cork East constituency since the 2016 general election.

He was a member of Cork County Council from 2014 to 2016.

== Personal life ==
He is a native of Midleton, County Cork. Buckley is married to Sandra and they have two children.

Before entering politics Buckley made a living in construction work. His father had been a stonemason in the Midleton area.

Between 2002 and 2003, Buckley lost two brothers, Mark (30) and James (22) to suicide. This prompted him to become an active mental health, wellness and suicide prevention campaigner and he has spoken about his experience many times. Buckley and other concerned people in the Midelton community set up a charity, the Let's Get Together Foundation, to help raise awareness of the problem.

== Political career ==
Buckley was elected for the Cork East local electoral area in the 2014 Cork County Council election, with 12.11% of the first preference vote.

Buckley contest the 2016 general election for the Cork East constituency, retaining the Sinn Féin seat won by Sandra McLellan in 2011 with 5,358 first preference votes.

In 2018, he was appointed Spokesperson on Mental Health and Suicide Prevention following Mary Lou McDonald's election to the role of President of Sinn Féin. Since his election to the Dáil, he has been a member of the Oireachtas Committee on the Future of Healthcare helping to develop the Sláintecare report. In 2017, Buckley was appointed to the Oireachtas Committee on the Future of Mental Healthcare which was tasked with developing a strategy for developing a world class public mental healthcare service.

At the 2020 general election, Buckley was re-elected in the Cork East constituency. He was re-elected at the 2024 general election.

== Legal issues ==
Buckley received a three-year drink-driving ban and was fined €500 in December 2014 following an incident on 9 June 2013 when he was stopped by gardaí while driving. Tests showed that Buckley was over three times above the permitted blood-alcohol level. Buckley stated after his conviction, "as a SF public representative I regret my actions and my choice to drive after drink".

Buckley pleaded guilty before Midleton District Court in May 2018 to being drunk and to engaging in threatening and abusive behaviour to a garda in the course of his duty. His guilty plea was related to an incident which occurred at Buckley's home in August 2017 following a noise complaint. Responding officers were told to "fuck off" by Buckley who has stated that he was under the influence of alcohol and deeply regrets his behaviour.

Dáil	Election	Deputy (Party)	Deputy (Party)	Deputy (Party)	Deputy (Party)	Deputy (Party)
4th	1923	John Daly (Ind.)	Michael Hennessy (CnaG)	David Kent (Rep)	John Dinneen (FP)	Thomas O'Mahony (CnaG)
4th	1924 by-election	John Daly (Ind.)	Michael Hennessy (CnaG)	David Kent (Rep)	John Dinneen (FP)	Michael K. Noonan (CnaG)
5th	1927 (Jun)	John Daly (Ind.)	Michael Hennessy (CnaG)	David Kent (SF)	David O'Gorman (FP)	Martin Corry (FF)
6th	1927 (Sep)	John Daly (CnaG)	Michael Hennessy (CnaG)	William Kent (FF)	Edmond Carey (CnaG)	Martin Corry (FF)
7th	1932	John Daly (CnaG)	William Broderick (CnaG)	Brook Brasier (Ind.)	Patrick Murphy (FF)	Martin Corry (FF)
8th	1933	Patrick Daly (CnaG)	William Broderick (CnaG)	William Kent (NCP)	Patrick Murphy (FF)	Martin Corry (FF)
9th	1937	Constituency abolished				

Dáil	Election	Deputy (Party)	Deputy (Party)	Deputy (Party)
13th	1948	Martin Corry (FF)	Patrick O'Gorman (FG)	Seán Keane (Lab)
14th	1951	Martin Corry (FF)	Patrick O'Gorman (FG)	Seán Keane (Lab)
14th	1953 by-election	Martin Corry (FF)	Patrick O'Gorman (FG)	Richard Barry (FG)
15th	1954	Martin Corry (FF)	John Moher (FF)	Richard Barry (FG)
16th	1957	Martin Corry (FF)	John Moher (FF)	Richard Barry (FG)
17th	1961	Constituency abolished		

Dáil	Election	Deputy (Party)	Deputy (Party)	Deputy (Party)	Deputy (Party)
22nd	1981	Carey Joyce (FF)	Myra Barry (FG)	Patrick Hegarty (FG)	Joe Sherlock (SF–WP)
23rd	1982 (Feb)	Michael Ahern (FF)	Myra Barry (FG)	Patrick Hegarty (FG)	Joe Sherlock (SF–WP)
24th	1982 (Nov)	Michael Ahern (FF)	Myra Barry (FG)	Patrick Hegarty (FG)	Ned O'Keeffe (FF)
25th	1987	Michael Ahern (FF)	Joe Sherlock (WP)	Patrick Hegarty (FG)	Ned O'Keeffe (FF)
26th	1989	Michael Ahern (FF)	Joe Sherlock (WP)	Paul Bradford (FG)	Ned O'Keeffe (FF)
27th	1992	Michael Ahern (FF)	John Mulvihill (Lab)	Paul Bradford (FG)	Ned O'Keeffe (FF)
28th	1997	Michael Ahern (FF)	David Stanton (FG)	Paul Bradford (FG)	Ned O'Keeffe (FF)
29th	2002	Michael Ahern (FF)	David Stanton (FG)	Joe Sherlock (Lab)	Ned O'Keeffe (FF)
30th	2007	Michael Ahern (FF)	David Stanton (FG)	Seán Sherlock (Lab)	Ned O'Keeffe (FF)
31st	2011	Sandra McLellan (SF)	David Stanton (FG)	Seán Sherlock (Lab)	Tom Barry (FG)
32nd	2016	Pat Buckley (SF)	David Stanton (FG)	Seán Sherlock (Lab)	Kevin O'Keeffe (FF)
33rd	2020	Pat Buckley (SF)	David Stanton (FG)	Seán Sherlock (Lab)	James O'Connor (FF)
34th	2024	Pat Buckley (SF)	Noel McCarthy (FG)	Liam Quaide (SD)	James O'Connor (FF)
