= 2004 Cork County Council election =

2004 Irish local government election

← 1999	11 June 2004	2009 →

All 48 seats on Cork County Council
	First party	Second party	Third party
Party	Fine Gael	Fianna Fáil	Labour
Seats won	24	16	5
Seat change	+3	-3	+1
	Fourth party	Fifth party	Sixth party
Party	Sinn Féin	Independent	Progressive Democrats
Seats won	1	2	0
Seat change	+1	-1	-1
- Map showing the area of Cork County Council
Council control after election
Fine Gael

An election to Cork County Council took place on 11 June 2004 as part of that year's Irish local elections. 48 councillors were elected from ten local electoral areas by PR-STV voting for a five-year term of office.

== Results by party ==
Party	Seats	±	First Pref. votes	FPv%	±%
Fine Gael	24	+3	61,025	37.19	
Fianna Fáil	16	-3	54,030	32.93	
Labour	5	+1	16,729	10.19	
Sinn Féin	1	+1	10,079	6.14	
Independent	2	-1	13,059	7.96	
Progressive Democrats	0	-1	2,174	1.32	
Totals	48	-	164,093	100.00	—

== Results by local electoral area ==
=== Bandon ===
Bandon - 3 seats
Party	Candidate	FPv%	Count			
Party	Candidate	FPv%	1	2	3	4
Fine Gael	Veronica Neville	20.46	2,763	2,923	3,138	3,534
Fine Gael	Kevin Murphy*	20.44	2,761	2,916	3,396	
Fianna Fáil	Alan Coleman*	16.41	2,216	2,335	2,537	3,490
Fianna Fáil	Jerry Deasy*	14.02	1,894	1,952	1,995	
Sinn Féin	John Desmond	13.62	1,840	1,926	2,065	2,399
Labour	Tomas O'Brien	8.00	1,081	1,307		
Green	Noel Giles	4.86	656			
Independent	Edmund Butler	2.18	294			
Electorate: 21,561 Valid: 13,505 (62.64%) Spoilt: 221 Quota: 3,377 Turnout: 13,726 (63.66%)

=== Bantry ===
Bantry - 5 seats
Party	Candidate	FPv%	Count						
Party	Candidate	FPv%	1	2	3	4	5	6	7
Fine Gael	P.J. Sheehan*	19.10	2,101						
Fine Gael	Noel Harrington*	13.40	1,474	1,517	1,574	1,584	1,726	1,752	1,772
Fine Gael	John P. O'Shea*	13.03	1,433	1,514	1,516	1,578	1,757	1,897	
Fianna Fáil	Danny Crowley	12.92	1,421	1,426	1,463	1,471	1,505	1,600	1,768
Fianna Fáil	Donal Casey*	11.76	1,294	1,328	1,331	1,385	1,469	2,081	
Sinn Féin	Anne O'Leary	9.41	1,035	1,063	1,091	1,120	1,312	1,408	1,467
Fianna Fáil	Vivian O'Callaghan*	9.05	995	1,021	1,021	1,038	1,090		
Green	Jacqueline Hodgson	4.63	509	523	526	548			
Labour	Eddie Mullins	3.20	352	366	368	381			
Independent	Liam Ward	2.15	237	256	262				
Independent	Michael O'Sullivan	1.35	148	151					
Electorate: 17,011 Valid: 10,999 (64.66%) Spoilt: 181 Quota: 1,834 Turnout: 11,180 (65.72%)

=== Blarney ===
Blarney - 4 seats
Party	Candidate	FPv%	Count					
Party	Candidate	FPv%	1	2	3	4	5	6
Fine Gael	Gerry Kelly*	20.57	3,402					
Fianna Fáil	Dan Fleming*	19.33	3,197	3,223	3,232	3,339		
Fine Gael	Tomas Ryan*	19.13	2,667	2,698	2,730	2,832	2,988	3,125
Labour	John Gilroy	11.06	1,829	1,865	1,880	2,196	2,561	2,834
Progressive Democrats	Michael Burns	9.11	1,507	1,522	1,537	1,677	1,801	2,376
Fianna Fáil	Tom Joyce	8.70	1,438	1,445	1,456	1,500	1,647	
Sinn Féin	John Stanton	7.25	1,199	1,246	1,250	1,388		
Green	Michelle Brett	5.97	987	1,081	1,089			
Independent	Celine Spengeman	1.88	311					
Electorate: 31,074 Valid: 16,537 (53.22%) Spoilt: 374 Quota: 3,308 Turnout: 16,911 (54.42%)

=== Carrigaline ===
Carrigaline - 7 seats
Party	Candidate	FPv%	Count						
Party	Candidate	FPv%	1	2	3	4	5	6	7
Fianna Fáil	Michael McGrath	13.57	3,951						
Fianna Fáil	Mark O'Keeffe*	10.63	3,094	3,117	3,162	3,244	3,297	3,496	3,546
Fine Gael	Derry Canty*	10.61	3,088	3,148	3,154	3,208	3,307	3,523	3,837
Fianna Fáil	Deirdre Forde*	10.16	2,957	3,030	3,088	3,441	3,598	3,718	
Fine Gael	Tim Lombard*	7.96	2,318	2,491	2,519	2,600	2,691	2,797	3,321
Fine Gael	Peter Kelly*	7.38	2,148	2,303	2,318	2,548	2,732	2,839	3,128
Fianna Fáil	Barry Cogan*	7.02	2,044	2,093	2,157	2,218	2,283	2,387	2,831
Fine Gael	John A. Collins	6.67	1,943	2,051	2,088	2,144	2,231	2,289	
Labour	Paula Desmond*	6.12	1,783	1,860	1,879	1,999	2,505	2,985	3,268
Sinn Féin	Darren O'Keeffe	5.92	1,724	1,748	1,762	1,900	2,136		
Green	Dominick Donnelly	5.39	1,570	1,646	1,659	1,863			
Independent	Joe Harris	5.34	1,555	1,594	1,607				
Fine Gael	Jo Kelleher	3.22	936						
Electorate: 56,644 Valid: 29,111 (51.39%) Spoilt: 615 Quota: 3,639 Turnout: 29,726 (52.48%)

=== Fermoy ===
Fermoy - 4 seats
Party	Candidate	FPv%	Count						
Party	Candidate	FPv%	1	2	3	4	5	6	7
Fianna Fáil	Kevin O'Keeffe*	27.88	3,671						
Fianna Fáil	Frank O'Flynn*	19.39	2,553	3,202					
Fine Gael	Aileen Pyne*	15.57	2,050	2,149	2,241	2,313	2,532	2,963	
Fine Gael	Liam O'Doherty	13.58	1,788	1,885	1,993	2,017	2,029	2,179	2,329
Sinn Féin	Tim White	7.04	927	981	1,032	1,074	1,124	1,170	1,190
Labour	Tim Fitzgerald	5.44	716	767	822	844	948	1,027	1,067
Progressive Democrats	Margaret Egerton	5.07	667	704	771	826	907		
Labour	Tadhg O'Donovan	3.65	480	517	549	611			
Green	Martin O'Keeffe	2.39	315	328	345				
Electorate: 21,986 Valid: 13,167 (59.89%) Spoilt: 244 Quota: 2,634 Turnout: 13,411 (61.00%)

=== Kanturk ===
Kanturk - 5 seats
Party	Candidate	FPv%	Count					
Party	Candidate	FPv%	1	2	3	4	5	6
Fine Gael	Patrick Buckley*	17.75	2,734					
Fine Gael	Marian Murphy	14.44	2,379	2,424	2,499	2,711		
Fianna Fáil	Marie (The Shamrock) Murphy*	14.29	2,202	2,216	2,366	2,413	2,431	2,586
Fianna Fáil	Mike Donegan*	11.25	1,733	1,738	1,806	1,969	1,981	2,157
Fianna Fáil	Tony McAuliffe	11.19	1,723	1,750	1,801	1,890	1,908	2,125
Fine Gael	Noel Buckley	10.08	1,553	1,580	1,717	1,784	1,803	2,261
Fine Gael	Timmy Collins*	9.20	1,417	1,446	1,499	1,694	1,765	
Labour	Ted Linehan	5.43	837	843	1,041			
Labour	Denis Cremin	3.03	467	477				
Green	Ted Bradley	2.33	359	362				
Electorate: 23,934 Valid: 15,404 (64.36%) Spoilt: 347 Quota: 2,568 Turnout: 15,751 (65.81%)

=== Macroom ===
Macroom - 3 seats
Party	Candidate	FPv%	Count				
Party	Candidate	FPv%	1	2	3	4	5
Fine Gael	Michael Creed*	29.91	3,710				
Fianna Fáil	Aindrias Moynihan*	25.24	3,130				
Fine Gael	Frank Metcalfe*	12.27	1,510	1,828	1,937	2,040	2,291
Labour	Martin Coughlan	11.23	1,393	1,519	1,763	2,192	2,729
Independent	Jerry O'Sullivan	8.80	1,092	1,163	1,357	1,516	
Fianna Fáil	Pat O'Connell	7.01	869	934	989		
Green	Caroline Robinson	5.64	699	728			
Electorate: 18,445 Valid: 12,403 (67.24%) Spoilt: 271 Quota: 3,101 Turnout: 12,674 (68.71%)

=== Mallow ===
Mallow - 4 seats
Party	Candidate	FPv%	Count					
Party	Candidate	FPv%	1	2	3	4	5	6
Labour	Seán Sherlock*	25.32	3,184					
Fianna Fáil	Dan Joe Fitzgerald*	20.45	2,571					
Fine Gael	Tom Sheahan*	13.60	1,710	1,795	1,874	1,967	1,975	2,252
Fine Gael	Noel O'Connor*	13.19	1,658	1,855	2,050	2,175	2,186	2,808
Fine Gael	Anthony Ahern	8.49	1,067	1,144	1,289	1,399	1,407	
Fianna Fáil	David Willis	7.36	925	1,039	1,117	1,433	1,462	1,631
Fianna Fáil	Jim Hogan	6.49	816	880	943			
Green	Ted Lucey	5.11	642	774				
Electorate: 19,908 Valid: 12,573 (63.16%) Spoilt: 220 Quota: 2,515 Turnout: 12,793 (64.26%)

=== Midleton ===
Midleton - 6 seats
Party	Candidate	FPv%	Count									
Party	Candidate	FPv%	1	2	3	4	5	6	7	8	9	10
Fine Gael	Michael Hegarty*	13.90	3,089	3,111	3,123	3,185						
Independent	Noel Collins*	13.39	2,977	3,089	3,095	3,114	3,207					
Labour	John Mulvihill*	13.01	2,891	2,913	3,011	3,152	3,369					
Sinn Féin	Martin Hallinan	9.49	2,110	2,140	2,145	2,160	2,219	2,232	2,367	2,616	2,620	2,819
Fianna Fáil	Maurice Ahern*	8.49	1,887	1,902	1,993	2,004	2,028	2,030	2,258	2,708	2,711	2,967
Independent	Seán O'Connor	7.43	1,652	1,658	1,720	1,815	1,892	1,944	1,970	2,001	2,008	
Independent	Ted Murphy*	7.23	1,608	1,632	1,641	1,653	1,706	1,729	1,874	2,017	2,028	2,211
Fine Gael	Barbara Murray	6.93	1,540	1,555	1,562	1,645	1,732	1,780	1,939	2,397	2,403	2,538
Fianna Fáil	David Savage	6.11	1,358	1,367	1,390	1,396	1,419	1,425	1,728			
Fianna Fáil	Art Supple*	5.25	1,167	1,175	1,201	1,205	1,220	1,223				
Green	Sarah Iremonger	3.32	737	754	764	782						
Fine Gael	Paddy Whitty	2.15	477	482	506							
Fianna Fáil	Joe Dowling	1.84	409	412								
Independent	Christy Carr	1.47	326									
Electorate: 39,660 Valid: 22,228 (56.05%) Spoilt: 469 Quota: 3,176 Turnout: 22,697 (57.23%)

=== Skibbereen ===
Skibbereen - 7 seats
Party	Candidate	FPv%	Count						
Party	Candidate	FPv%	1	2	3	4	5	6	7
Independent	Christy O'Sullivan*	15.74	2,859						
Fianna Fáil	Donal O'Rourke*	12.04	2,188	2,265	2,284				
Fine Gael	Maura Cal McCarthy*	8.90	1,616	1,673	1,699	1,769	1,825	1,874	2,385
Fine Gael	John Collins*	8.35	1,516	1,542	1,559	1,858	2,224	2,302	
Fine Gael	Jim Daly	8.15	1,481	1,570	1,614	1,656	1,692	1,799	1,955
Fine Gael	Tadhg O'Donovan*	8.10	1,471	1,525	1,539	1,547	1,556	1,858	1,956
Fianna Fáil	Joe Carroll	7.30	1,327	1,426	1,439	1,481	1,856	2,169	2,216
Sinn Féin	Cionnaith O Suilleabhain	6.85	1,244	1,300	1,380	1,419	1,486	1,587	1,766
Fine Gael	John O'Sullivan	6.74	1,225	1,256	1,281	1,296	1,309	1,341	
Fianna Fáil	Tom O'Neill*	5.50	1,000	1,032	1,037	1,155			
Labour	Brendan Leahy*	4.88	887	924	1,024	1,230	1,243		
Labour	Phyllis McCarthy	4.56	829	845	946				
Green	Bernie Connolly	2.88	523	537					
Electorate: 27,444 Valid: 18,166 (66.19%) Spoilt: 338 Quota: 2,271 Turnout: 18,504 (67.42%)
