= Cork East (Dáil constituency) =

Dáil constituency (1923–1937, 1948–1961, 1981–present)

- Dáil constituency
- Location of Cork East within Ireland
- Interactive map of constituency boundaries since the 2024 general election
- Major settlements: Cobh; Fermoy; Midleton; Mitchelstown; Youghal

Current constituency
- Created: 1981
- Seats: 4
- TDs: Pat Buckley (SF); Noel McCarthy (FG); James O'Connor (FF); Liam Quaide (SD)
- Local government area: County Cork
- EP constituency: South

Cork East
- Former Dáil constituency

Former constituency
- Created: 1948
- Abolished: 1961
- Seats: 3
- Local government area: County Cork

Cork East
- Former Dáil constituency

Former constituency
- Created: 1923
- Abolished: 1937
- Seats: 5
- Local government area: County Cork

Cork East is a parliamentary constituency in County Cork represented in Dáil Éireann, the lower house of the Irish parliament or Oireachtas. The constituency elects four deputies (Teachtaí Dála, commonly known as TDs) on the system of proportional representation by means of the single transferable vote (PR-STV).

== History and boundaries ==
The constituency was first created in 1923 under the Electoral Act 1923 as a four-seat constituency and was first used for the 1923 general election. It was abolished under the Electoral (Revision of Constituencies) Act 1935. It was recreated under the Electoral (Amendment) Act 1947 as a 3-seat constituency and used for the 1948 general election until it was abolished under the Electoral (Amendment) Act 1961. It was recreated under the Electoral (Amendment) Act 1980 as a 4-seat constituency for the 1981 general election, and has been used at all elections since then.

The constituency runs from Mitchelstown in the north of County Cork, through Fermoy, to Cobh, Midleton and Youghal in the south.

The Constituency Review Report 2023 of the Electoral Commission recommended that at the next general election, Cork East be altered with the transfer of territory to Cork North-Central and Cork North-West.

The Electoral (Amendment) Act 2023 defines the constituency as:

"In the county of Cork, the electoral divisions of:

Cobh Rural, Knockraha, in the former Rural District of Cork;
Aghern, Ballyhooly, Ballynoe, Castlecooke, Castle Hyde, Castlelyons, Castletownroche, Coole, Curraglass, Fermoy Rural, Glanworth East, Glanworth West, Gortnaskehy, Gortroe, Kilcor, Kilcummer, Killathy, Kilworth, Knockmourne, Leitrim, Rathcormack, in the former Rural District of Fermoy;
Carrig, Clenor, Monanimy, Shanballymore, Skahanagh, Wallstown, in the former Rural District of Mallow;
Ballintemple, Ballycottin, Ballyspillane, Carrigtohill, Castlemartyr, Clonmult, Cloyne, Corkbeg, Dangan, Dungourney, Garryvoe, Ightermurragh, Inch, Lisgoold, Midleton Rural, Mogeely, Rostellan, Templebodan, Templenacarriga, in the former Rural District of Midleton;
Ballyarthur, Derryvillane, Farahy, Kildorrery, Kilgullane, Kilphelan, Marshalstown, Mitchelstown, Templemolaga, in the former Rural District of Mitchelstown No. 1;
Ardagh, Clonpriest, Kilcronat, Killeagh, Kilmacdonogh, Youghal Rural, in the former Rural District of Youghal No. 1;
and Cobh Urban, Fermoy Urban, Midleton Urban and Youghal Urban."

Changes to the Cork East constituency
Years	TDs	Boundaries	Notes
1981–2002	4	In County Cork, the district electoral divisions of Cobh Rural in the former Rural District of Cork; Aghern, Ballyhooly, Ballynoe, Carrig, Castlecooke, Castle Hyde, Castlelyons, Castletownroche, Coole, Curraglass, Fermoy Rural, Glanworth East, Glanworth West, Gortnaskehy, Gortroe, Kilcor, Kilcummer, Kildinan, Killathy, Kilworth, Knockmourne, Leitrim, Rathcormack, Watergrasshill, in the former Rural District of Fermoy; Ballyclogh, Ballynamona, Buttevant, Caherduggan, Carrig, Clenor, Doneraile, Kilmaclenine, Mallow Rural, Monanimy, Rahan, Shanballymore, Skahanagh, Wallstown, in the former Rural District of Mallow; Ballintemple, Ballycottin, Ballyspillane, Carrigtohill, Castlemartyr, Clonmult, Cloyne, Corkbeg, Dangan, Dungourney, Garryvoe, Ightermurragh, Inch, Lisgoold, Midleton Rural, Mogeely, Rostellan, Templebodan, Templenacarriga, in the former Rural District of Midleton; Ballyarthur, Derryvillane, Farahy, Kildorrery, Kilgullane, Kilphelan, Marshalstown, Mitchelstown, Templemolaga, in the former Rural District of Mitchelstown No. 1; Ardagh, Clonpriest, Kilcronat, Killeagh, Kilmacdonagh, Youghal Rural, in the former Rural District of Youghal No. 1; and the urban districts of Cobh, Fermoy, Mallow, Midleton and Youghal.	Created from Cork North-East; with transfer of DEDs (except for Cobh Rural) in the former Rural District of Cork to Cork North-Central and Cork South-Central.
2002–2011	4	In County Cork, the electoral divisions of Ballynaglogh, Cobh Rural, Glenville, Knockraha in the former Rural District of Cork; Aghern, Ballyhooly, Ballynoe, Carrig, Castlecooke, Castle Hyde, Castlelyons, Castletownroche, Coole, Curraglass, Fermoy Rural, Glanworth East, Glanworth West, Gortnaskehy, Gortroe, Kilcor, Kilcummer, Kildinan, Killathy, Kilworth, Knockmourne, Leitrim, Rathcormack, Watergrasshill, in the former Rural District of Fermoy; Ballyclogh, Ballynamona, Buttevant, Caherduggan, Carrig, Clenor, Doneraile, Kilmaclenine, Mallow Rural, Monanimy, Rahan, Shanballymore, Skahanagh, Wallstown, in the former Rural District of Mallow; Ballintemple, Ballycottin, Ballyspillane, Carrigtohill, Castlemartyr, Clonmult, Cloyne, Corkbeg, Dangan, Dungourney, Garryvoe, Ightermurragh, Inch, Lisgoold, Midleton Rural, Mogeely, Rostellan, Templebodan, Templenacarriga, in the former Rural District of Midleton; Ballyarthur, Derryvillane, Farahy, Kildorrery, Kilgullane, Kilphelan, Marshalstown, Mitchelstown, Templemolaga, in the former Rural District of Mitchelstown No. 1; Ardagh, Clonpriest, Kilcronat, Killeagh, Kilmacdonagh, Youghal Rural, in the former Rural District of Youghal No. 1; and the urban districts of Cobh, Fermoy, Mallow, Midleton and Youghal.	Transfer from Cork North-Central of electoral divisions of Glenville, Ballynaglogh and Knockraha.
2011–2024	4	In County Cork, the electoral divisions of Cobh Rural, Knockraha, in the former Rural District of Cork; Aghern, Ballyhooly, Ballynoe, Castlecooke, Castle Hyde, Castlelyons, Castletownroche, Coole, Curraglass, Fermoy Rural, Glanworth East, Glanworth West, Gortnaskehy, Gortroe, Kilcor, Kilcummer, Killathy, Kilworth, Knockmourne, Leitrim, Rathcormack, in the former Rural District of Fermoy; Ballyclogh, Buttevant, Caherduggan, Carrig, Clenor, Doneraile, Kilmaclenine, Mallow Rural, Monanimy, Shanballymore, Skahanagh, Wallstown, in the former Rural District of Mallow; Ballintemple, Ballycottin, Ballyspillane, Carrigtohill, Castlemartyr, Clonmult, Cloyne, Corkbeg, Dangan, Dungourney, Garryvoe, Ightermurragh, Inch, Lisgoold, Midleton Rural, Mogeely, Rostellan, Templebodan, Templenacarriga, in the former Rural District of Midleton; Ballyarthur, Derryvillane, Farahy, Kildorrery, Kilgullane, Kilphelan, Marshalstown, Mitchelstown, Templemolaga, in the former Rural District of Mitchelstown No. 1; Ardagh, Clonpriest, Kilcronat, Killeagh, Kilmacdonagh, Youghal Rural, in the former Rural District of Youghal No. 1; and the towns of Cobh, Fermoy, Mallow, Midleton and Youghal.	Transfer to Cork North-Central of Electoral divisions of Ballynaglogh and Glenville in the former Rural District of Cork, Carrig, Kildinan and Watergrasshill in the former Rural District of Fermoy and Ballynamona and Rahan in the former Rural District of Mallow.
2024–	4	In County Cork, the electoral divisions of Cobh Rural, Knockraha, in the former Rural District of Cork; Aghern, Ballyhooly, Ballynoe, Castlecooke, Castle Hyde, Castlelyons, Castletownroche, Coole, Curraglass, Fermoy Rural, Glanworth East, Glanworth West, Gortnaskehy, Gortroe, Kilcor, Kilcummer, Killathy, Kilworth, Knockmourne, Leitrim, Rathcormack, in the former Rural District of Fermoy; Carrig, Clenor, Monanimy, Shanballymore, Skahanagh, Wallstown, in the former Rural District of Mallow; Ballintemple, Ballycottin, Ballyspillane, Carrigtohill, Castlemartyr, Clonmult, Cloyne, Corkbeg, Dangan, Dungourney, Garryvoe, Ightermurragh, Inch, Lisgoold, Midleton Rural, Mogeely, Rostellan, Templebodan, Templenacarriga, in the former Rural District of Midleton; Ballyarthur, Derryvillane, Farahy, Kildorrery, Kilgullane, Kilphelan, Marshalstown, Mitchelstown, Templemolaga, in the former Rural District of Mitchelstown No. 1; Ardagh, Clonpriest, Kilcronat, Killeagh, Kilmacdonogh, Youghal Rural, in the former Rural District of Youghal No. 1; and Cobh Urban, Fermoy Urban, Midleton Urban and Youghal Urban.	Transfer to Cork North-Central of the electoral divisions of Mallow North urban, Mallow South Urban, and Mallow Rural in the former Rural District of Mallow; and transfer to Cork North-West of the electoral divisions of Ballyclogh, Buttevant, Caherduggan, Doneraile, Kilmaclenine in the former Rural District of Mallow.

== TDs ==
=== TDs 1923–1937 ===
Teachtaí Dála (TDs) for Cork East 1923–1937
Key to parties: CnaG = Cumann na nGaedheal; FP = Farmers' Party; FF = Fianna Fáil; Ind = Independent; NCP = National Centre Party; Rep = Republican; SF = Sinn Féin
Dáil	Election	Deputy (Party)	Deputy (Party)	Deputy (Party)	Deputy (Party)	Deputy (Party)
4th	1923	John Daly (Ind.)	Michael Hennessy (CnaG)	David Kent (Rep)	John Dinneen (FP)	Thomas O'Mahony (CnaG)
4th	1924 by-election	John Daly (Ind.)	Michael Hennessy (CnaG)	David Kent (Rep)	John Dinneen (FP)	Michael K. Noonan (CnaG)
5th	1927 (Jun)	John Daly (Ind.)	Michael Hennessy (CnaG)	David Kent (SF)	David O'Gorman (FP)	Martin Corry (FF)
6th	1927 (Sep)	John Daly (CnaG)	Michael Hennessy (CnaG)	William Kent (FF)	Edmond Carey (CnaG)	Martin Corry (FF)
7th	1932	John Daly (CnaG)	William Broderick (CnaG)	Brook Brasier (Ind.)	Patrick Murphy (FF)	Martin Corry (FF)
8th	1933	Patrick Daly (CnaG)	William Broderick (CnaG)	William Kent (NCP)	Patrick Murphy (FF)	Martin Corry (FF)
9th	1937	Constituency abolished				

Note: The columns in this table are used only for presentational purposes, and no significance should be attached to the order of columns. For details of the order in which seats were won at each election, see the detailed results of that election.

=== TDs 1948–1961 ===
Teachtaí Dála (TDs) for Cork East 1948–1961
Key to parties: FF = Fianna Fáil; FG = Fine Gael; Lab = Labour
Dáil	Election	Deputy (Party)	Deputy (Party)	Deputy (Party)
13th	1948	Martin Corry (FF)	Patrick O'Gorman (FG)	Seán Keane (Lab)
14th	1951	Martin Corry (FF)	Patrick O'Gorman (FG)	Seán Keane (Lab)
14th	1953 by-election	Martin Corry (FF)	Patrick O'Gorman (FG)	Richard Barry (FG)
15th	1954	Martin Corry (FF)	John Moher (FF)	Richard Barry (FG)
16th	1957	Martin Corry (FF)	John Moher (FF)	Richard Barry (FG)
17th	1961	Constituency abolished		

Note: The columns in this table are used only for presentational purposes, and no significance should be attached to the order of columns. For details of the order in which seats were won at each election, see the detailed results of that election.

=== TDs since 1981 ===
Teachtaí Dála (TDs) for Cork East 1981–
Key to parties: FF = Fianna Fáil; FG = Fine Gael; Lab = Labour; SF = Sinn Féin; SF–WP = Sinn Féin The Workers' Party; SD = Social Democrats; WP = Workers' Party
Dáil	Election	Deputy (Party)	Deputy (Party)	Deputy (Party)	Deputy (Party)
22nd	1981	Carey Joyce (FF)	Myra Barry (FG)	Patrick Hegarty (FG)	Joe Sherlock (SF–WP)
23rd	1982 (Feb)	Michael Ahern (FF)	Myra Barry (FG)	Patrick Hegarty (FG)	Joe Sherlock (SF–WP)
24th	1982 (Nov)	Michael Ahern (FF)	Myra Barry (FG)	Patrick Hegarty (FG)	Ned O'Keeffe (FF)
25th	1987	Michael Ahern (FF)	Joe Sherlock (WP)	Patrick Hegarty (FG)	Ned O'Keeffe (FF)
26th	1989	Michael Ahern (FF)	Joe Sherlock (WP)	Paul Bradford (FG)	Ned O'Keeffe (FF)
27th	1992	Michael Ahern (FF)	John Mulvihill (Lab)	Paul Bradford (FG)	Ned O'Keeffe (FF)
28th	1997	Michael Ahern (FF)	David Stanton (FG)	Paul Bradford (FG)	Ned O'Keeffe (FF)
29th	2002	Michael Ahern (FF)	David Stanton (FG)	Joe Sherlock (Lab)	Ned O'Keeffe (FF)
30th	2007	Michael Ahern (FF)	David Stanton (FG)	Seán Sherlock (Lab)	Ned O'Keeffe (FF)
31st	2011	Sandra McLellan (SF)	David Stanton (FG)	Seán Sherlock (Lab)	Tom Barry (FG)
32nd	2016	Pat Buckley (SF)	David Stanton (FG)	Seán Sherlock (Lab)	Kevin O'Keeffe (FF)
33rd	2020	Pat Buckley (SF)	David Stanton (FG)	Seán Sherlock (Lab)	James O'Connor (FF)
34th	2024	Pat Buckley (SF)	Noel McCarthy (FG)	Liam Quaide (SD)	James O'Connor (FF)

Note: The columns in this table are used only for presentational purposes, and no significance should be attached to the order of columns. For details of the order in which seats were won at each election, see the detailed results of that election.

== Elections ==
*: Outgoing TD

=== 2024 general election ===
2024 general election: Cork East
Party	Candidate	FPv%	Count											
Party	Candidate	FPv%	1	2	3	4	5	6	7	8	9	10	11	12
Sinn Féin	Pat Buckley	12.3	5,901	5,937	5,986	6,096	6,609	6,752	6,890	7,187	8,042	8,261	9,173	9,194
Fianna Fáil	James O'Connor	12.3	5,891	5,907	5,944	5,956	5,964	6,007	6,169	6,322	7,378	9,924		
Fine Gael	Mark Stanton	12.0	5,740	5,764	5,800	5,809	5,816	5,854	6,092	6,255	6,791	7,169	7,689	7,793
Fine Gael	Noel McCarthy	11.2	5,364	5,371	5,440	5,450	5,464	5,507	5,721	5,790	5,912	7,216	9,400	9,561
Fianna Fáil	Deirdre O'Brien	10.8	5,196	5,201	5,293	5,301	5,308	5,362	5,438	5,568	5,810			
Social Democrats	Liam Quaide	10.0	4,791	4,821	4,844	5,143	5,199	5,261	5,934	6,203	6,872	7,108	7,889	7,925
Independent	William O'Leary	9.6	4,615	4,685	4,817	4,836	4,853	4,992	5,034	5,421	5,903	6,643		
Independent	Mary Linehan Foley	7.9	3,805	3,851	3,889	3,916	3,939	4,146	4,209	4,526				
Aontú	Mona Stromsoe	3.7	1,789	1,867	1,903	1,928	1,945	2,125	2,177					
Green	Clíona O'Halloran	3.4	1,609	1,620	1,621	1,677	1,712	1,753						
Independent Ireland	Kathryn Bermingham	1.8	842	962	1,020	1,050	1,067							
Sinn Féin	Mehdi Özçınar	1.4	671	678	685	739								
PBP–Solidarity	Asch Ní Fhinn (Note: Ní Fhinn is a member of People Before Profit.)	1.4	662	678	685									
Independent	Frank Roche	1.1	572	615										
The Irish People	James Peter O'Sullivan	0.7	334											
Independent Ireland	Catherine Lynch	0.3	135											
Independent	John O'Leary	0.1	55											
Independent	Ross Cannon	0.1	37											
Electorate: 83,545 Valid: 48,009 Spoilt: 317 Quota: 9,602 Turnout: 57.8%

=== 2020 general election ===
2020 general election: Cork East
Party	Candidate	FPv%	Count							
Party	Candidate	FPv%	1	2	3	4	5	6	7	8
Sinn Féin	Pat Buckley	23.1	12,587							
Fianna Fáil	Kevin O'Keeffe	13.6	7,414	7,502	7,537	7,611	7,916	8,065	8,786	9,078
Fianna Fáil	James O'Connor	12.9	7,026	7,132	7,143	7,188	7,365	7,769	8,093	9,731
Labour	Seán Sherlock	12.1	6,610	6,842	6,926	7,129	7,289	8,933	9,894	11,237
Fine Gael	David Stanton	11.3	6,143	6,207	6,214	6,245	6,318	6,957	9,576	10,309
Fine Gael	Pa O'Driscoll	8.3	4,554	4,591	4,604	4,654	4,736	4,974		
Independent	Mary Linehan-Foley	7.2	3,903	4,288	4,363	4,685	5,063	5,884	5,986	
Green	Liam Quaide	6.9	3,749	4,024	4,075	4,228	4,442			
Aontú	Conor Hannon	2.5	1,337	1,500	1,522	1,698				
Irish Freedom	Frank Shinnick	0.8	455	560	598					
Independent	Thomas Kiely	0.8	435	579	629					
Independent	Shane O'Grady	0.5	267	334						
Independent	Sean O'Leary	0.1	64	76						
Electorate: 89,998 Valid: 54,544 Spoilt: 401 Quota: 10,909 Turnout: 54,945 (61.1%)

=== 2016 general election ===
2016 general election: Cork East
Party	Candidate	FPv%	Count									
Party	Candidate	FPv%	1	2	3	4	5	6	7	8	9	10
Fianna Fáil	Kevin O'Keeffe	15.6	8,264	8,290	8,347	8,416	8,548	8,875	9,254	9,880	11,035	
Fine Gael	David Stanton	13.6	7,171	7,296	7,401	7,484	7,593	8,312	9,099	9,647	11,558	
Labour	Seán Sherlock	13.2	6,949	7,124	7,394	7,486	7,780	8,674	8,986	9,916	11,803	
Sinn Féin	Pat Buckley	10.1	5,358	5,437	5,572	5,969	6,776	6,861	7,681	8,175	8,457	8,639
Fianna Fáil	Barbara Ahern	8.7	4,594	4,635	4,730	4,824	4,986	5,081	5,553	6,216	6,432	6,781
Fine Gael	Noel McCarthy	8.3	4,406	4,425	4,479	4,565	4,718	5,688	5,779	6,203		
Fine Gael	Tom Barry	6.6	3,461	3,495	3,520	3,532	3,573					
Renua	Paul Bradford	6.1	3,244	3,327	3,460	3,531	3,834	4,191	4,596			
Independent	Mary Linehan Foley	6.0	3,145	3,280	3,365	3,515	4,104	4,132				
AAA–PBP	Ciara Leonardi Roche	3.8	1,999	2,176	2,586	3,237						
Independent	Kieran McCarthy	3.1	1,635	1,692	1,813							
Social Democrats	Ken Curtin	2.6	1,386	1,570								
Green	Natasha Harty	1.5	806									
Independent	Patrick Bullman	0.5	241									
Independent	Ross Cannon	0.3	147									
Electorate: 83,236 Valid: 52,806 Spoilt: 445 Quota: 10,562 Turnout: 64.0%

=== 2011 general election ===
2011 general election: Cork East
Party	Candidate	FPv%	Count						
Party	Candidate	FPv%	1	2	3	4	5	6	7
Labour	Seán Sherlock	20.8	11,862						
Fine Gael	David Stanton	17.6	10,019	10,047	10,618	11,081	12,471		
Sinn Féin	Sandra McLellan	11.1	6,292	6,345	6,877	7,203	7,528	7,586	9,785
Fine Gael	Tom Barry	10.2	5,798	5,888	6,097	6,397	8,898	9,726	11,450
Labour	John Mulvihill	10.0	5,701	5,873	6,388	6,790	6,976	7,097	
Fine Gael	Pa O'Driscoll	8.8	5,030	5,086	5,236	5,444			
Fianna Fáil	Kevin O'Keeffe	8.8	5,024	5,066	5,145	7,811	8,401	8,478	9,136
Fianna Fáil	Michael Ahern	8.1	4,618	4,634	4,798				
New Vision	Paul O'Neill (Note: New Vision was an electoral alliance of independent non-party candidates and did not appear on the ballot.)	1.9	1,056	1,064					
Green	Malachy Harty	1.1	635	640					
Independent	Claire Cullinane	0.9	510	513					
Independent	Patrick Bulman	0.4	212	213					
Independent	Paul Burke	0.3	176	177					
Electorate: 83,651 Valid: 56,933 Spoilt: 526 (0.9%) Quota: 11,387 Turnout: 57,459 (68.7%)

=== 2007 general election ===
2007 general election: Cork East
Party	Candidate	FPv%	Count					
Party	Candidate	FPv%	1	2	3	4	5	6
Fianna Fáil	Michael Ahern	19.2	10,350	10,536	11,221			
Fianna Fáil	Ned O'Keeffe	18.7	10,081	10,189	10,741	11,033		
Fine Gael	Paul Bradford	16.6	8,916	9,110	9,375	9,398	9,837	9,863
Fine Gael	David Stanton	14.3	7,686	8,038	8,717	8,777	10,349	10,386
Labour	Seán Sherlock	13.6	7,295	7,650	8,287	8,324	10,100	10,162
Labour	John Mulvihill	7.4	3,954	4,232	4,773	4,820		
Sinn Féin	Sandra McLellan	6.8	3,672	3,943				
Green	Sarah Iremonger	2.9	1,572					
Fathers Rights	Christy Carr	0.3	166					
Independent	John Cronin	0.2	116					
Electorate: 84,354 Valid: 53,808 Spoilt: 477 (0.9%) Quota: 10,762 Turnout: 54,285 (64.4%)

=== 2002 general election ===
2002 general election: Cork East
Party	Candidate	FPv%	Count			
Party	Candidate	FPv%	1	2	3	4
Fianna Fáil	Ned O'Keeffe	23.1	10,574			
Fianna Fáil	Michael Ahern	18.2	8,340	9,204		
Fine Gael	Paul Bradford	15.4	7,053	7,224	7,718	8,231
Fine Gael	David Stanton	13.7	6,269	6,324	6,978	8,438
Labour	John Mulvihill	10.5	4,813	4,838	5,559	
Labour	Joe Sherlock	10.5	4,792	5,015	6,192	8,660
Sinn Féin	June Murphy	5.7	2,624	2,685		
Green	Martin O'Keeffe	2.5	1,136	1,151		
Christian Solidarity	Patrick Manning	0.4	187	189		
Electorate: 72,702 Valid: 45,788 Spoilt: 546 (1.2%) Quota: 9,158 Turnout: 46,334 (63.7%)

=== 1997 general election ===
1997 general election: Cork East
Party	Candidate	FPv%	Count							
Party	Candidate	FPv%	1	2	3	4	5	6	7	8
Fianna Fáil	Ned O'Keeffe	20.3	8,737							
Fine Gael	Paul Bradford	18.3	7,859	7,907	7,922	8,009	8,302	8,538	8,733	
Fianna Fáil	Michael Ahern	16.2	6,959	7,200	7,274	7,665	8,137	9,295		
Fine Gael	David Stanton	11.9	5,117	5,182	5,185	5,315	5,527	5,820	5,998	7,735
Democratic Left	Joe Sherlock	10.7	4,622	4,681	4,698	4,921	5,186	5,357	5,510	6,972
Labour	John Mulvihill	8.1	3,500	3,969	3,970	4,298	4,419	4,560	4,669	
Progressive Democrats	J. J. Flavin	4.3	1,830	1,872	1,878	2,046	2,242			
National Party	Máiread Scannell	3.8	1,637	1,754	1,757	1,912				
Sinn Féin	Kieran McCarthy	3.6	1,534	1,711	1,713					
Independent	Seán O'Connor	3.0	1,281							
Electorate: 63,653 Valid: 43,076 Spoilt: 331 (0.8%) Quota: 8,616 Turnout: 43,407 (68.2%)

=== 1992 general election ===
1992 general election: Cork East
Party	Candidate	FPv%	Count						
Party	Candidate	FPv%	1	2	3	4	5	6	7
Fianna Fáil	Ned O'Keeffe	20.2	8,380						
Fianna Fáil	Michael Ahern	17.9	7,418	7,471	7,483	7,512	7,605	7,888	8,510
Fine Gael	Paul Bradford	16.3	6,750	6,760	6,773	6,787	6,795	7,707	9,790
Labour	John Mulvihill	13.8	5,703	5,705	5,753	5,830	5,944	6,161	7,830
Democratic Left	Joe Sherlock	12.9	5,351	5,365	5,386	5,417	5,479	5,557	
Fine Gael	Patrick Hegarty	11.1	4,594	4,596	4,611	4,627	4,653	5,635	5,871
Fine Gael	Michael Hegarty	6.2	2,562	2,563	2,568	2,573	2,580		
Sinn Féin	Kieran McCarthy	0.9	366	366	381	393			
Independent	Maurice Quinlan	0.5	212	212	218				
Workers' Party	Sandra Doyle-Condon	0.4	153	153					
Electorate: 58,556 Valid: 41,489 Spoilt: 684 (1.6%) Quota: 8,298 Turnout: 42,173 (72.0%)

=== 1989 general election ===
1989 general election: Cork East
Party	Candidate	FPv%	Count				
Party	Candidate	FPv%	1	2	3	4	5
Fianna Fáil	Ned O'Keeffe	21.6	8,851				
Fine Gael	Paul Bradford	18.7	7,663	7,679	7,735	8,204	
Workers' Party	Joe Sherlock	18.1	7,414	7,425	7,533	7,657	8,447
Fianna Fáil	Michael Ahern	18.0	7,396	7,431	7,891	8,005	8,150
Fine Gael	Patrick Hegarty	17.2	7,068	7,080	7,096	7,360	7,708
Labour	Anthony Hobbs	3.4	1,377	1,392	1,394	1,469	
Progressive Democrats	Thomas Nagle	2.7	1,098	1,100	1,109		
Independent	William Fitzsimon	0.3	131				
Electorate: 56,251 Valid: 40,998 Quota: 8,200 Turnout: 72.9%

=== 1987 general election ===
1987 general election: Cork East
Party	Candidate	FPv%	Count			
Party	Candidate	FPv%	1	2	3	4
Fianna Fáil	Ned O'Keeffe	19.6	8,178	8,253	8,340	8,862
Fianna Fáil	Michael Ahern	19.6	8,169	8,357		
Workers' Party	Joe Sherlock	16.7	6,986	7,547	7,728	8,357
Fine Gael	Patrick Hegarty	16.4	6,831	7,064	7,464	8,429
Fine Gael	Paul Bradford	14.1	5,908	5,984	6,177	7,128
Progressive Democrats	John Guinevan	5.6	2,340	2,370	3,517	
Progressive Democrats	Hugh Hall	4.6	1,936	2,090		
Labour	Anthony Hobbs	2.1	888			
Sinn Féin	Kieran McCarthy	1.3	534			
Electorate: 55,767 Valid: 41,770 Quota: 8,355 Turnout: 74.9%

=== November 1982 general election ===
November 1982 general election: Cork East
Party	Candidate	FPv%	Count			
Party	Candidate	FPv%	1	2	3	4
Fine Gael	Myra Barry	20.4	8,461			
Fianna Fáil	Ned O'Keeffe	20.0	8,324			
Fianna Fáil	Michael Ahern	19.4	8,061	8,087	8,274	8,342
Fine Gael	Patrick Hegarty	18.4	7,662	7,686	8,125	9,458
Workers' Party	Joe Sherlock	14.9	6,186	6,206	6,640	6,817
Fine Gael	Tommy Sheahan	3.8	1,565	1,574	1,665	
Labour	Tomás Ó Conaill	2.9	1,191	1,219		
Independent	Mary Duggan	0.3	117			
Electorate: 53,462 Valid: 41,567 Quota: 8,314 Turnout: 77.7%

=== February 1982 general election ===
February 1982 general election: Cork East
Party	Candidate	FPv%	Count				
Party	Candidate	FPv%	1	2	3	4	5
Fine Gael	Myra Barry	21.5	8,870				
Fine Gael	Patrick Hegarty	20.2	8,309				
Fianna Fáil	Michael Ahern	17.0	7,011	7,149	8,830		
Sinn Féin The Workers' Party	Joe Sherlock	16.2	6,677	7,200	7,674	8,102	8,137
Fianna Fáil	Carey Joyce	13.6	5,601	5,659	7,257	7,456	8,008
Fianna Fáil	William Cronin	9.2	3,799	3,845			
Labour	Tomás Ó Conaill	2.3	946				
Electorate: 52,647 Valid: 41,213 Spoilt: 321 (0.8%) Quota: 8,243 Turnout: 41,534 (78.9%)

=== 1981 general election ===
1981 general election: Cork East
Party	Candidate	FPv%	Count								
Party	Candidate	FPv%	1	2	3	4	5	6	7	8	9
Fine Gael	Myra Barry	21.9	9,373								
Fine Gael	Patrick Hegarty	17.9	7,686	8,095	8,125	8,151	8,407	10,287			
Sinn Féin The Workers' Party	Joe Sherlock	14.6	6,241	6,322	6,351	6,398	6,549	6,906	7,466	8,093	8,412
Fianna Fáil	Carey Joyce	13.2	5,661	5,716	5,727	5,742	5,748	5,881	5,995	7,535	8,289
Fianna Fáil	John Brosnan	10.3	4,401	4,418	4,431	4,435	4,504	4,523	4,562	5,110	7,575
Fianna Fáil	Joe Dowling	8.1	3,489	3,500	3,506	3,511	3,543	3,559	3,585	3,779	
Fianna Fáil	Charles Mortell	6.5	2,773	2,779	2,785	2,790	2,797	2,949	3,139		
Fine Gael	Tommy Sheahan	5.5	2,363	2,565	2,588	2,608	2,659				
Labour	Edward Allen	1.1	457	462	471	629					
Labour	Mary Noonan	0.6	267	276	288						
Independent	Mary Duggan	0.4	150	155							
Electorate: 52,647 Valid: 42,861 Quota: 8,573 Turnout: 81.4%

=== 1957 general election ===
1957 general election: Cork East
Party	Candidate	FPv%	Count		
Party	Candidate	FPv%	1	2	3
Fianna Fáil	Martin Corry	25.0	6,873		
Fianna Fáil	John Moher	24.1	6,628	6,961	
Fine Gael	Richard Barry	19.1	5,255	5,621	5,970
Fine Gael	Patrick O'Gorman	16.8	4,618	5,116	5,519
Sinn Féin	Liam Ó Mochloir	8.6	2,365	2,682	
Labour	Michael Devane	6.4	1,750		
Electorate: 36,474 Valid: 27,489 Quota: 6,873 Turnout: 75.4%

=== 1954 general election ===
1954 general election: Cork East
Party	Candidate	FPv%	Count			
Party	Candidate	FPv%	1	2	3	4
Fine Gael	Richard Barry	23.6	7,026	7,725		
Fianna Fáil	Martin Corry	22.6	6,714	6,861	7,311	7,328
Fianna Fáil	John Moher	19.9	5,925	6,095	6,895	6,913
Fine Gael	Patrick O'Gorman	15.1	4,489	4,788	6,634	6,892
Labour	Seán Keane, Jnr	13.7	4,081	4,173		
Clann na Talmhan	Denis Heskin	5.0	1,492			
Electorate: 36,804 Valid: 29,727 Quota: 7,432 Turnout: 80.8%

=== 1953 by-election ===
Following the death of Labour Party TD Seán Keane, a by-election was held on 18 June 1953.

1953 by-election: Cork East
Party	Candidate	FPv%	Count	
Party	Candidate	FPv%	1	2
Fine Gael	Richard Barry	42.8	12,479	15,761
Fianna Fáil	John Moher	40.4	11,823	12,784
Labour	Seán Keane, Jnr	16.8	4,902	
Electorate: 37,057 Valid: 29,204 Quota: 14,603 Turnout: 78.8%

=== 1951 general election ===
1951 general election: Cork East
Party	Candidate	FPv%	Count					
Party	Candidate	FPv%	1	2	3	4	5	6
Fianna Fáil	Martin Corry	24.6	7,430	7,798				
Labour	Seán Keane	17.6	5,296	5,678	5,738	5,841	6,704	8,414
Fianna Fáil	John Moher	17.4	5,261	5,311	5,433	5,660	5,952	6,080
Fine Gael	Patrick O'Gorman	15.5	4,688	5,028	5,077	5,756	9,380	
Fine Gael	Richard Barry	14.4	4,337	4,433	4,452	5,106		
Independent	John Ryall	5.9	1,792	1,835	1,841			
Independent	Veronica Hartland	4.5	1,360					
Electorate: 37,561 Valid: 30,164 Quota: 7,542 Turnout: 80.3%

=== 1948 general election ===
1948 general election: Cork East
Party	Candidate	FPv%	Count								
Party	Candidate	FPv%	1	2	3	4	5	6	7	8	9
Fianna Fáil	Martin Corry	24.5	7,172	7,341							
Fine Gael	Patrick O'Gorman	13.9	4,072	4,175	4,176	4,199	4,539	4,818	6,557	8,952	
Labour	Seán Keane	13.9	4,066	4,339	4,340	4,472	4,627	5,216	5,421	5,835	6,267
Fianna Fáil	Leo Skinner	13.7	4,013	4,043	4,050	4,113	4,346	4,528	4,557	4,879	4,987
Clann na Talmhan	Daniel Cashman	11.4	3,352	3,366	3,367	3,416	3,494	3,662	3,962		
Fine Gael	Joseph Ahern	7.4	2,170	2,230	2,231	2,243	2,384	2,537			
Clann na Poblachta	Michael Burke	5.6	1,638	1,699	1,700	2,240	2,364				
Independent	William Dwyer	4.0	1,167	1,215	1,217	1,231					
Clann na Poblachta	Garrett Roche	2.8	833	861	861						
National Labour Party	Patrick J. O'Brien	2.8	823								
Electorate: 39,226 Valid: 29,306 Quota: 7,327 Turnout: 74.7%

=== 1933 general election ===
1933 general election: Cork East
Party	Candidate	FPv%	Count					
Party	Candidate	FPv%	1	2	3	4	5	6
Fianna Fáil	Martin Corry	25.0	10,923					
National Centre Party	William Kent	17.6	7,712					
Fianna Fáil	Patrick Murphy	11.6	5,092	8,006				
Cumann na nGaedheal	William Broderick	10.1	4,432	4,475	4,575	4,577	5,414	8,467
Independent	Brook Brasier	10.0	4,389	4,463	4,565	4,568	4,817	
Fianna Fáil	Patrick O'Brien	9.7	4,244	4,693	4,711	5,414	5,520	5,767
Cumann na nGaedheal	Patrick Daly	8.3	3,645	3,717	3,854	3,857	6,053	7,083
Cumann na nGaedheal	Edward Cronin	7.6	3,324	3,401	3,462	3,463		
Electorate: 52,723 Valid: 43,761 Quota: 7,294 Turnout: 83.0%

=== 1932 general election ===
1932 general election: Cork East
Party	Candidate	FPv%	Count							
Party	Candidate	FPv%	1	2	3	4	5	6	7	8
Fianna Fáil	Patrick Murphy	13.9	5,518	5,608	5,984	6,021	6,078	6,099	6,136	6,176
Cumann na nGaedheal	William Broderick	13.8	5,453	5,901	6,018	7,329				
Fianna Fáil	Martin Corry	12.5	4,939	5,001	5,563	5,649	6,034	6,069	6,105	6,126
Fianna Fáil	William Kent	12.3	4,870	4,979	5,395	5,471	5,704	5,726	5,813	5,857
Cumann na nGaedheal	John Daly	11.3	4,477	4,873	5,007	5,657	7,779			
Independent	Brook Brasier	10.7	4,245	4,606	4,819	5,106	6,069	6,597	7,302	
Cumann na nGaedheal	Edmond Carey	8.9	3,519	3,598	3,677	4,163				
Cumann na nGaedheal	Michael Hennessy	6.8	2,703	2,862	3,032					
Labour	Eamonn Lynch	5.4	2,154	2,167						
Farmers' Party	David O'Gorman	4.4	1,746							
Electorate: 52,154 Valid: 39,624 Quota: 6,605 Turnout: 76.0%

=== September 1927 general election ===
September 1927 general election: Cork East
Party	Candidate	FPv%	Count								
Party	Candidate	FPv%	1	2	3	4	5	6	7	8	9
Cumann na nGaedheal	Michael Hennessy	14.4	5,130	5,204	5,539	5,849	5,913	5,926	7,167		
Cumann na nGaedheal	John Daly	14.4	5,125	5,145	5,474	5,645	5,804	5,819	7,280		
Fianna Fáil	Martin Corry	11.8	4,208	4,996	5,043	5,149	6,529				
Cumann na nGaedheal	Edmond Carey	10.8	3,851	3,887	3,967	4,527	4,843	4,847	5,311	6,091	
Fianna Fáil	William Kent	8.5	3,014	3,283	3,368	3,414	4,159	4,669	4,921	5,004	5,071
Farmers' Party	David O'Gorman	8.4	2,988	2,999	3,138	3,854	3,902	3,905			
Labour	Eamon Lynch	8.2	2,918	3,202	3,548	3,593	3,977	4,030	4,083	4,096	4,137
Fianna Fáil	John Barry	8.1	2,888	3,017	3,245	3,270					
Farmers' Party	Brook Brasier	5.5	1,951	1,963	2,095						
Independent	Philip Barry	5.1	1,812	1,844							
Fianna Fáil	Séamus Fitzgerald	4.8	1,700								
Electorate: 53,005 Valid: 35,585 Quota: 5,931 Turnout: 67.1%

=== June 1927 general election ===
June 1927 general election: Cork East
Party	Candidate	FPv%	Count										
Party	Candidate	FPv%	1	2	3	4	5	6	7	8	9	10	11
Sinn Féin	David Kent	11.4	3,870	3,898	3,937	3,957	4,092	4,150	4,157	4,600	4,750	5,081	5,167
Cumann na nGaedheal	Michael Hennessy	11.0	3,743	3,751	4,398	4,541	4,713	5,860					
Independent	John Daly	10.9	3,704	3,731	3,861	3,907	4,524	4,710	4,771	5,004	5,262	6,435	
Fianna Fáil	Martin Corry	10.8	3,666	3,673	3,682	3,773	3,928	3,977	3,978	5,246	5,330	5,489	5,545
Independent	Edmond Carey	8.8	2,976	3,001	3,007	3,251	3,471	3,554	3,561	3,749	3,998	4,362	4,542
Independent	Frederick McCabe	8.0	2,714	2,723	2,761	2,879	3,109	3,196	3,238	3,291	3,375		
Farmers' Party	David O'Gorman	6.6	2,251	2,257	2,438	2,771	2,800	2,946	3,002	3,050	4,474	4,948	5,152
Fianna Fáil	John Barry	6.5	2,210	2,215	2,221	2,232	2,340	2,509	2,519				
Farmers' Party	John Dinneen	5.5	1,853	1,860	1,912	2,479	2,508	2,597	2,627	2,655			
Cumann na nGaedheal	Michael Cahill	5.4	1,830	1,832	2,022	2,095	2,151						
Labour	Patrick Murphy	5.3	1,793	1,807	1,820	1,831							
Farmers' Party	Brook Brasier	5.1	1,724	1,731	1,757								
Cumann na nGaedheal	Michael K. Noonan	4.1	1,379	1,385									
Independent	Eugene Joyce	0.5	161										
Electorate: 53,005 Valid: 33,874 Quota: 5,646 Turnout: 63.9%

=== 1924 by-election ===
Following the death of Cumann na nGaedheal TD Thomas O'Mahony, a by-election was held on 18 November 1924.

1924 by-election: Cork East
Party	Candidate	FPv%	Count
Party	Candidate	FPv%	1
Cumann na nGaedheal	Michael K. Noonan	58.8	17,717
Republican	Michael Walsh	41.2	12,399
Electorate: 53,752 Valid: 30,116 Quota: 15,059 Turnout: 56.0%

=== 1923 general election ===
1923 general election: Cork East
Party	Candidate	FPv%	Count							
Party	Candidate	FPv%	1	2	3	4	5	6	7	8
Independent	John Daly	21.1	6,391							
Cumann na nGaedheal	Michael Hennessy	20.3	6,152							
Republican	David Kent	18.2	5,524							
Farmers' Party	John Dinneen	12.9	3,927	4,210	4,352	4,365	4,383	5,069		
Cumann na nGaedheal	Thomas O'Mahony	6.7	2,023	2,318	2,783	2,791	2,809	2,873	4,404	4,539
Farmers' Party	David O'Gorman	5.5	1,672	1,734	1,778	1,790	1,817	2,451	2,648	2,789
Farmers' Party	William Fahy	5.1	1,539	1,593	1,614	1,623	1,628			
Cumann na nGaedheal	Daniel Hegarty	5.0	1,516	1,669	2,045	2,049	2,059	2,147		
Republican	Séamus Fitzgerald	4.7	1,428	1,764	1,796	2,076	2,339	2,417	2,470	
Republican	Cornelius Moran	0.6	179	328	341	480				
Electorate: 56,600 Valid: 30,351 Quota: 5,059 Turnout: 53.6%

== See also ==
- Dáil constituencies
- Elections in the Republic of Ireland
- Politics of the Republic of Ireland
- List of Dáil by-elections
- List of political parties in the Republic of Ireland
