= Liam Quaide =

Irish politician

Liam Quaide TD
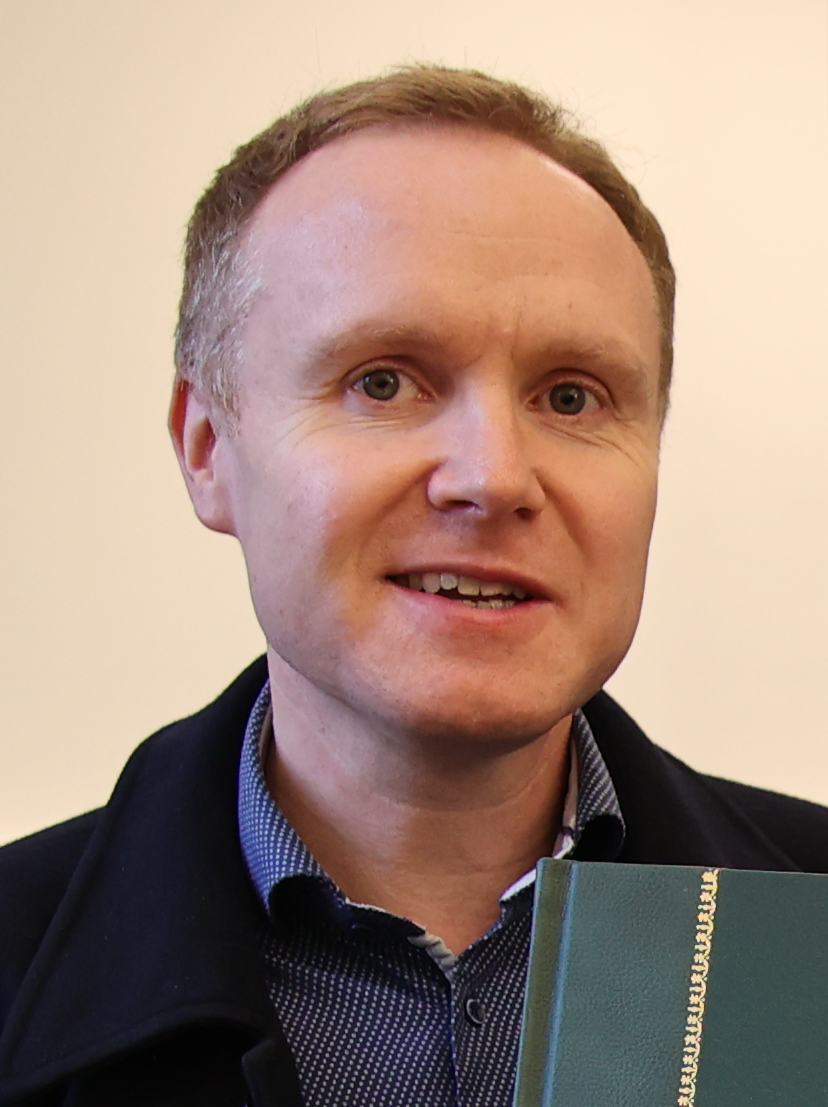
- Quaide in 2024

Teachta Dála
- Incumbent
- Assumed office November 2024
- Constituency: Cork East

Personal details
- Born: 12 August 1979 (age 46) Cork, Ireland
- Party: Social Democrats
- Other political affiliations: Green Party (until 2023)
- Spouse: Róisín Cuddihy (m. 2012)
- Children: 2
- Education: University College Cork; University of Galway; Trinity College Dublin

Liam Quaide (born 12 August 1979) is an Irish Social Democrats politician who has been a Teachta Dála (TD) for the Cork East constituency since the 2024 general election.

== Early life ==
Quaide grew up in Elton, rural County Limerick. He did his undergraduate at University College Cork (UCC), graduating in 2001. He went on to complete a Master of Arts in Ethical and Cultural Studies at NUI Galway and a doctorate in Clinical Psychology at Trinity College Dublin. Before going into politics, Quaide worked as a clinical psychologist.

== Political career ==
Quaide won a seat on Cork County Council in the 2019 Irish local elections as a member of the Green Party. Quaide stood for the Greens in the 2020 Irish general election in Cork East but was unsuccessful.

In April 2023, Quaide left the Green Party, citing frustration with the government's handling of the Owenacurra mental health facility closure. Quaide,who had campaigned against the closure, criticised his party colleagues for failing to challenge the decision, which he believed caused serious harm to vulnerable individuals. The Owenacurra Centre, located in Midleton, had been slated for closure in 2021 but remained open amid strong local opposition. Quaide argued that the government had rubber-stamped the closure despite mounting evidence that residents were being moved from single rooms to shared dorms, severing their connection to the community.

In his resignation statement, Quaide linked the government's response to the closure with broader concerns about its treatment of vulnerable groups, including those facing homelessness and Mother and Baby home survivors. He also expressed concerns that government policies, such as those related to housing, caused social division and alienated people from the Green Party's agenda. Quaide praised Green Party TD Neasa Hourigan for her efforts in the Owenacurra Centre campaign, noting her actions were more impactful than those of several other local TDs.

In November 2023, Quaide joined the Social Democrats. At the 2024 general election, Quaide was elected to the Dáil on the 12th count in Cork East.

== Personal life ==
In 2012, Quaide married fellow UCC graduate Róisín Cuddihy, whom he met in 2006 while working in Dublin. The couple returned to Cork after marrying and settled in Midleton in 2014. They have a daughter and a son.

Dáil	Election	Deputy (Party)	Deputy (Party)	Deputy (Party)	Deputy (Party)	Deputy (Party)
4th	1923	John Daly (Ind.)	Michael Hennessy (CnaG)	David Kent (Rep)	John Dinneen (FP)	Thomas O'Mahony (CnaG)
4th	1924 by-election	John Daly (Ind.)	Michael Hennessy (CnaG)	David Kent (Rep)	John Dinneen (FP)	Michael K. Noonan (CnaG)
5th	1927 (Jun)	John Daly (Ind.)	Michael Hennessy (CnaG)	David Kent (SF)	David O'Gorman (FP)	Martin Corry (FF)
6th	1927 (Sep)	John Daly (CnaG)	Michael Hennessy (CnaG)	William Kent (FF)	Edmond Carey (CnaG)	Martin Corry (FF)
7th	1932	John Daly (CnaG)	William Broderick (CnaG)	Brook Brasier (Ind.)	Patrick Murphy (FF)	Martin Corry (FF)
8th	1933	Patrick Daly (CnaG)	William Broderick (CnaG)	William Kent (NCP)	Patrick Murphy (FF)	Martin Corry (FF)
9th	1937	Constituency abolished				

Dáil	Election	Deputy (Party)	Deputy (Party)	Deputy (Party)
13th	1948	Martin Corry (FF)	Patrick O'Gorman (FG)	Seán Keane (Lab)
14th	1951	Martin Corry (FF)	Patrick O'Gorman (FG)	Seán Keane (Lab)
14th	1953 by-election	Martin Corry (FF)	Patrick O'Gorman (FG)	Richard Barry (FG)
15th	1954	Martin Corry (FF)	John Moher (FF)	Richard Barry (FG)
16th	1957	Martin Corry (FF)	John Moher (FF)	Richard Barry (FG)
17th	1961	Constituency abolished		

Dáil	Election	Deputy (Party)	Deputy (Party)	Deputy (Party)	Deputy (Party)
22nd	1981	Carey Joyce (FF)	Myra Barry (FG)	Patrick Hegarty (FG)	Joe Sherlock (SF–WP)
23rd	1982 (Feb)	Michael Ahern (FF)	Myra Barry (FG)	Patrick Hegarty (FG)	Joe Sherlock (SF–WP)
24th	1982 (Nov)	Michael Ahern (FF)	Myra Barry (FG)	Patrick Hegarty (FG)	Ned O'Keeffe (FF)
25th	1987	Michael Ahern (FF)	Joe Sherlock (WP)	Patrick Hegarty (FG)	Ned O'Keeffe (FF)
26th	1989	Michael Ahern (FF)	Joe Sherlock (WP)	Paul Bradford (FG)	Ned O'Keeffe (FF)
27th	1992	Michael Ahern (FF)	John Mulvihill (Lab)	Paul Bradford (FG)	Ned O'Keeffe (FF)
28th	1997	Michael Ahern (FF)	David Stanton (FG)	Paul Bradford (FG)	Ned O'Keeffe (FF)
29th	2002	Michael Ahern (FF)	David Stanton (FG)	Joe Sherlock (Lab)	Ned O'Keeffe (FF)
30th	2007	Michael Ahern (FF)	David Stanton (FG)	Seán Sherlock (Lab)	Ned O'Keeffe (FF)
31st	2011	Sandra McLellan (SF)	David Stanton (FG)	Seán Sherlock (Lab)	Tom Barry (FG)
32nd	2016	Pat Buckley (SF)	David Stanton (FG)	Seán Sherlock (Lab)	Kevin O'Keeffe (FF)
33rd	2020	Pat Buckley (SF)	David Stanton (FG)	Seán Sherlock (Lab)	James O'Connor (FF)
34th	2024	Pat Buckley (SF)	Noel McCarthy (FG)	Liam Quaide (SD)	James O'Connor (FF)
