= Paul Bradford =

Irish former politician (born 1963)

Senator
- In office 12 September 2002 – 8 June 2016
- In office 25 April 1987 – 15 June 1989
- Constituency: Agricultural Panel

Teachta Dála
- In office June 1989 – May 2002
- Constituency: Cork East

Personal details
- Born: 1 December 1963 (age 62) Cork, Ireland
- Party: Renua (2015–2016)
- Other political affiliations: Independent (2013–2015); Fine Gael (until 2013)
- Spouse: Lucinda Creighton (m. 2011)
- Children: 3
- Education: University College Cork

Paul Bradford (born 1 December 1963) is an Irish former politician who served as a Senator for the Agricultural Panel from 1987 to 1989 and 2002 to 2016. He served as a Teachta Dála (TD) for the Cork East constituency from 1989 to 2002.

== Early and private life ==
Bradford was born in Mourne Abbey near Mallow, County Cork in 1963. He was educated at the Patrician Academy in Mallow. He is married to former Renua TD Lucinda Creighton.

== Political career ==
Bradford became involved in politics at a young age, becoming the youngest-ever member of Cork County Council when he was elected in 1985 at the age of 21. Two years later in 1987 he was elected to the 18th Seanad on the Agricultural Panel, becoming the youngest-ever elected Senator. As a member of Seanad Éireann he was Fine Gael spokesperson on Communications and Energy. At the 1989 general election he was elected to Dáil Éireann for the first time for the Cork East constituency. In 1994 he joined John Bruton's front bench as spokesperson on Defence and the Marine.

In 1994, Fine Gael came to power and Bradford became co-chair of the British–Irish Parliamentary Assembly. In 1997, the party was back in opposition and he was appointed spokesperson on Health, Food Safety and Older People. In 2000, Bradford became spokesperson on Youth Affairs, School Transport and Adult Education. Under Michael Noonan's leadership he was promoted to party Chief Whip, in which position he served until he lost his seat at the 2002 general election. He was subsequently elected to Seanad Éireann as a Senator for the Agricultural Panel. He was appointed Fine Gael spokesperson on Agriculture, Fisheries and Food in the Seanad.

He was an unsuccessful candidate in Cork East for Dáil Éireann at the 2007 general election but was re-elected to the Seanad. He was again re-elected to the Seanad in 2011. He was the Fine Gael Seanad spokesperson on Justice until July 2013.

Bradford was expelled from the Fine Gael parliamentary party on 16 July 2013 when he defied the party whip by voting against the Protection of Life During Pregnancy Bill 2013. On 13 September 2013, he and six other expellees formed the Reform Alliance, described as a "loose alliance" rather than a political party.

He joined Renua on its foundation in March 2015 and contested the 2016 general election for the party in Cork East, but, like all the party's candidates, failed to win a seat.

Dáil	Election	Deputy (Party)	Deputy (Party)	Deputy (Party)	Deputy (Party)	Deputy (Party)
4th	1923	John Daly (Ind.)	Michael Hennessy (CnaG)	David Kent (Rep)	John Dinneen (FP)	Thomas O'Mahony (CnaG)
4th	1924 by-election	John Daly (Ind.)	Michael Hennessy (CnaG)	David Kent (Rep)	John Dinneen (FP)	Michael K. Noonan (CnaG)
5th	1927 (Jun)	John Daly (Ind.)	Michael Hennessy (CnaG)	David Kent (SF)	David O'Gorman (FP)	Martin Corry (FF)
6th	1927 (Sep)	John Daly (CnaG)	Michael Hennessy (CnaG)	William Kent (FF)	Edmond Carey (CnaG)	Martin Corry (FF)
7th	1932	John Daly (CnaG)	William Broderick (CnaG)	Brook Brasier (Ind.)	Patrick Murphy (FF)	Martin Corry (FF)
8th	1933	Patrick Daly (CnaG)	William Broderick (CnaG)	William Kent (NCP)	Patrick Murphy (FF)	Martin Corry (FF)
9th	1937	Constituency abolished				

Dáil	Election	Deputy (Party)	Deputy (Party)	Deputy (Party)
13th	1948	Martin Corry (FF)	Patrick O'Gorman (FG)	Seán Keane (Lab)
14th	1951	Martin Corry (FF)	Patrick O'Gorman (FG)	Seán Keane (Lab)
14th	1953 by-election	Martin Corry (FF)	Patrick O'Gorman (FG)	Richard Barry (FG)
15th	1954	Martin Corry (FF)	John Moher (FF)	Richard Barry (FG)
16th	1957	Martin Corry (FF)	John Moher (FF)	Richard Barry (FG)
17th	1961	Constituency abolished		

Dáil	Election	Deputy (Party)	Deputy (Party)	Deputy (Party)	Deputy (Party)
22nd	1981	Carey Joyce (FF)	Myra Barry (FG)	Patrick Hegarty (FG)	Joe Sherlock (SF–WP)
23rd	1982 (Feb)	Michael Ahern (FF)	Myra Barry (FG)	Patrick Hegarty (FG)	Joe Sherlock (SF–WP)
24th	1982 (Nov)	Michael Ahern (FF)	Myra Barry (FG)	Patrick Hegarty (FG)	Ned O'Keeffe (FF)
25th	1987	Michael Ahern (FF)	Joe Sherlock (WP)	Patrick Hegarty (FG)	Ned O'Keeffe (FF)
26th	1989	Michael Ahern (FF)	Joe Sherlock (WP)	Paul Bradford (FG)	Ned O'Keeffe (FF)
27th	1992	Michael Ahern (FF)	John Mulvihill (Lab)	Paul Bradford (FG)	Ned O'Keeffe (FF)
28th	1997	Michael Ahern (FF)	David Stanton (FG)	Paul Bradford (FG)	Ned O'Keeffe (FF)
29th	2002	Michael Ahern (FF)	David Stanton (FG)	Joe Sherlock (Lab)	Ned O'Keeffe (FF)
30th	2007	Michael Ahern (FF)	David Stanton (FG)	Seán Sherlock (Lab)	Ned O'Keeffe (FF)
31st	2011	Sandra McLellan (SF)	David Stanton (FG)	Seán Sherlock (Lab)	Tom Barry (FG)
32nd	2016	Pat Buckley (SF)	David Stanton (FG)	Seán Sherlock (Lab)	Kevin O'Keeffe (FF)
33rd	2020	Pat Buckley (SF)	David Stanton (FG)	Seán Sherlock (Lab)	James O'Connor (FF)
34th	2024	Pat Buckley (SF)	Noel McCarthy (FG)	Liam Quaide (SD)	James O'Connor (FF)
