= Patrick Murphy (Irish politician) =

Irish politician (1889–1968)

Teachta Dála
- In office February 1932 – July 1937
- Constituency: Cork East

Personal details
- Born: 13 May 1889 County Cork, Ireland
- Died: 1 May 1968 (aged 78) County Cork, Ireland
- Party: Fianna Fáil

Patrick Stephen Murphy (13 May 1889 – 1 May 1968) was an Irish politician and solicitor. He was elected to Dáil Éireann as a Fianna Fáil Teachta Dála (TD) for the Cork East constituency at the 1932 general election. He was re-elected at the 1933 general election but lost his seat at the 1937 general election.

| Dáil | Election | Deputy (Party) | Deputy (Party) | Deputy (Party) | Deputy (Party) | Deputy (Party) |
|---|---|---|---|---|---|---|
| 4th | 1923 | John Daly (Ind.) | Michael Hennessy (CnaG) | David Kent (Rep) | John Dinneen (FP) | Thomas O'Mahony (CnaG) |
| 4th | 1924 by-election | John Daly (Ind.) | Michael Hennessy (CnaG) | David Kent (Rep) | John Dinneen (FP) | Michael K. Noonan (CnaG) |
| 5th | 1927 (Jun) | John Daly (Ind.) | Michael Hennessy (CnaG) | David Kent (SF) | David O'Gorman (FP) | Martin Corry (FF) |
| 6th | 1927 (Sep) | John Daly (CnaG) | Michael Hennessy (CnaG) | William Kent (FF) | Edmond Carey (CnaG) | Martin Corry (FF) |
| 7th | 1932 | John Daly (CnaG) | William Broderick (CnaG) | Brook Brasier (Ind.) | Patrick Murphy (FF) | Martin Corry (FF) |
| 8th | 1933 | Patrick Daly (CnaG) | William Broderick (CnaG) | William Kent (NCP) | Patrick Murphy (FF) | Martin Corry (FF) |
| 9th | 1937 | Constituency abolished | | | | |

| Dáil | Election | Deputy (Party) | Deputy (Party) | Deputy (Party) |
|---|---|---|---|---|
| 13th | 1948 | Martin Corry (FF) | Patrick O'Gorman (FG) | Seán Keane (Lab) |
| 14th | 1951 | Martin Corry (FF) | Patrick O'Gorman (FG) | Seán Keane (Lab) |
| 14th | 1953 by-election | Martin Corry (FF) | Patrick O'Gorman (FG) | Richard Barry (FG) |
| 15th | 1954 | Martin Corry (FF) | John Moher (FF) | Richard Barry (FG) |
| 16th | 1957 | Martin Corry (FF) | John Moher (FF) | Richard Barry (FG) |
| 17th | 1961 | Constituency abolished | | |

| Dáil | Election | Deputy (Party) | Deputy (Party) | Deputy (Party) | Deputy (Party) |
|---|---|---|---|---|---|
| 22nd | 1981 | Carey Joyce (FF) | Myra Barry (FG) | Patrick Hegarty (FG) | Joe Sherlock (SF–WP) |
| 23rd | 1982 (Feb) | Michael Ahern (FF) | Myra Barry (FG) | Patrick Hegarty (FG) | Joe Sherlock (SF–WP) |
| 24th | 1982 (Nov) | Michael Ahern (FF) | Myra Barry (FG) | Patrick Hegarty (FG) | Ned O'Keeffe (FF) |
| 25th | 1987 | Michael Ahern (FF) | Joe Sherlock (WP) | Patrick Hegarty (FG) | Ned O'Keeffe (FF) |
| 26th | 1989 | Michael Ahern (FF) | Joe Sherlock (WP) | Paul Bradford (FG) | Ned O'Keeffe (FF) |
| 27th | 1992 | Michael Ahern (FF) | John Mulvihill (Lab) | Paul Bradford (FG) | Ned O'Keeffe (FF) |
| 28th | 1997 | Michael Ahern (FF) | David Stanton (FG) | Paul Bradford (FG) | Ned O'Keeffe (FF) |
| 29th | 2002 | Michael Ahern (FF) | David Stanton (FG) | Joe Sherlock (Lab) | Ned O'Keeffe (FF) |
| 30th | 2007 | Michael Ahern (FF) | David Stanton (FG) | Seán Sherlock (Lab) | Ned O'Keeffe (FF) |
| 31st | 2011 | Sandra McLellan (SF) | David Stanton (FG) | Seán Sherlock (Lab) | Tom Barry (FG) |
| 32nd | 2016 | Pat Buckley (SF) | David Stanton (FG) | Seán Sherlock (Lab) | Kevin O'Keeffe (FF) |
| 33rd | 2020 | Pat Buckley (SF) | David Stanton (FG) | Seán Sherlock (Lab) | James O'Connor (FF) |
| 34th | 2024 | Pat Buckley (SF) | Noel McCarthy (FG) | Liam Quaide (SD) | James O'Connor (FF) |
