= Jose Ospina =

- Occupation: Social entrepreneur
- Years active: 1973 - present
- Known for: Voluntary housing and environmental work.
- Awards: Social Entrepreneurs Ireland Award (2007)

Jose Ospina is an architect, housing development consultant and author.

== Life ==
Originally from Colombia, he moved to the United Kingdom in 1969, before moving to Ireland in 1996. Starting off as a film student, he changed career paths in 1976. Ospina contributed to the Oxford Companion on Film (1976) from a Latin American perspective. The Guardian has credited him as "the brainchild" of London's first self-build housing co-operative by African-Caribbean Londoners in the 1990s. Ospina began working in housing in 1973 with Bristol Self- Help Housing Association. Ospina has worked with self-build organisations in South America, developed cooperative housing projects for CHISEL, a Secondary Housing Cooperative in south east London (two of these projects won the RIBA/DoE/NHBC design award), and worked for the South London Family Housing Association, and for Novas-Ouvertures Group in Ireland, among many others, according to cultivate.ie. In a 1999 book adaptation of Grand Designs, Ospina is described in an entry on the South London Family Housing Association as an "evangelical visionary figure".

He was a co-founder of Cork based charities Carbery Housing Association (CHA) in 2001 and Green Skibbereen in 2019. The Southern Star has credited him with saving homes from repossession. He has served as CHA's secretary and on its board of directors. Ospina is also known for his research on self-help housing projects. He has been Project Manager for various EU Projects under various programmes, involving eco-design of housing, digital manufacture of computers and energy efficiency retrofitting of existing low income homes. He has also been Expert Evaluator for the European Commission on the energy, environmental and urban innovation funding programmes. He was involved in Baile Dulra, a West Cork eco-hamlet project and worked with CECOP, the European Workers’ Co-operative Council. He received the Social Entrepreneurs Ireland Award in 2007. In 2011, he claimed that various attempts to develop social housing for rent by Carbery Housing Association were scuppered by lack of support from the local authority and from local politicians, who "have blocked planning approvals and land transfers to our association."

Ospina was one of the Directors part of Green Skibbereen’s 2021 Climate Action Plan which included a proposed Centre of Excellence for Climate Action Sustainability in West Cork.

He is the author of the book Housing Ourselves (1987), which has been used as a reference by the Australian Government and in books such as Matthew Thompson's Reconstructing Public Housing: Liverpool's Hidden History of Collective Alternatives, Community Architecture: How People Are Creating Their Own Environment by Nick Wates and Charles Knevitt and From Conflict to Inclusion in Housing: Interaction of Communities and Residents and Activists, edited by Graham Cairns, Georgios Artopoulos, and Kirsten Day of UCL Press.

He was a candidate for the Irish Labour Party for Skibbereen Town Council in 2004, but was not elected. He contested the Bantry County Council LEA in 2009, but was not elected.

As of 2021, he was Chair of Carbery Housing Association.

== Bibliography ==
- Housing Ourselves (Hilary Shipman, 1987)
