= 2019 Cork County Council election =

Part of the 2019 Irish local elections

- 24 May 2019

All 55 seats on Cork County Council 28 seats needed for a majority
	First party	Second party	Third party
Party	Fine Gael	Fianna Fáil	Sinn Féin
Seats won	20	18	2
Seat change	▲4	▲1	▼8
	Fourth party	Fifth party	Sixth party
Party	Labour	Green	Social Democrats
Seats won	2	2	1
Seat change	Steady	▲2	▲1
	Seventh party
Party	Independent
Seats won	10
Seat change	Steady
- Results by Local Electoral Area
Council control before election
Fine Gael
Council control after election
Fine Gael

An election to all 55 seats on Cork County Council was held on 24 May 2019 as part of the 2019 Irish local elections. County Cork was divided into 10 local electoral areas (LEAs) to elect councillors for a five-year term of office on the electoral system of proportional representation by means of the single transferable vote (PR-STV).

== Administrative changes ==
The election coincided with a transfer of land around Cork city from the administration of the County Council to that of Cork City Council. Several outgoing county councillors, based in areas transferred to the city, stood in the city council election. Compared to the previous election in 2014, the total number of councillors is unchanged, but following the recommendation of the 2018 Boundary Committee, there were significant changes to the LEAs, taking account of the transfer of land to the city, a maximum of 7 seats per LEA in its terms of reference, and population shifts revealed by the 2016 census.

== Analysis ==
Compared with the 2014 election, Fianna Fáil increased its seat number by 1 to 18 and also polled more votes than Fine Gael. However, Fine Gael gained an additional 4 seats to emerge as the largest party with 20 seats. Both parties benefitted from the collapse of Sinn Féin who only returned with 2 seats, a loss of 8. However, there had been many defections within the party in the years since 2014 and several councillors did not seek re-election. Independents won 10 seats, the same total as in 2014. The Green Party gained 2 seats in the Cobh and Midleton LEAs. After a recount, Holly Cairns won a seat in Bantry–West Cork for the Social Democrats.

== Results by party ==
Party	Seats	±	1st pref	FPv%	±%
Fine Gael	20	▲4	42,656	31.88	▲4.21
Fianna Fáil	18	▲1	45,143	33.74	▲5.09
Sinn Féin	2	▼8	7,273	5.44	▼9.08
Labour	2	Steady	4,368	3.26	▼3.95
Green	2	▲2	3,863	2.89	▲1.76
Social Democrats	1	▲1	3,369	2.52	New
Aontú	0	Steady	2,394	1.79	New
Inds. 4 Change	0	Steady	827	0.62	New
People Before Profit	0	Steady	188	0.14	▼0.97
Independent	10	Steady	23,719	17.73	▼1.63
Total	55	Steady	133,800	100.00	

== Results by local electoral area ==
*: Outgoing councillor elected in 2014.
†: Outgoing councillor coopted subsequent to the 2014 election.

=== Bandon–Kinsale ===
Bandon–Kinsale: 6 Seats
Party	Candidate	FPv%	Count								
Party	Candidate	FPv%	1	2	3	4	5	6	7	8	9
Fianna Fáil	Gillian Coughlan	18.65%	2,762								
Independent	Alan Coleman	15.87%	2,350								
Fine Gael	Kevin Murphy	11.95%	1,769	1,845	1,861	1,930	1,973	2,007	2,077	2,277	
Fine Gael	John O'Sullivan	11.00%	1,629	1,665	1,666	1,681	1,693	1,710	1,790	1,812	2,075
Fine Gael	Marie O'Sullivan	9.07%	1,343	1,386	1,397	1,426	1,449	1,491	1,528	1,753	1,984
Fianna Fáil	Sean O'Donovan	6.77%	1,002	1,197	1,201	1,233	1,265	1,301	1,594	1,658	1,931
Fine Gael	Gerard Seaman	5.91%	875	980	981	995	1,006	1,038	1,073	1,089	
Green	Gordon Reid	5.90%	873	895	902	914	993	1,067	1,089	1,275	1,318
Independent	Pat O'Regan	5.36%	793	810	839	865	927	1,048	1,084		
Fianna Fáil	Dermot Brennan	3.26%	483	601	603	623	643	673			
Aontú	Mairéad Ruane	2.94%	435	451	468	478	524				
Sinn Féin	Noel Harrington	2.54%	376	389	409	416					
Independent	Cormac Hayes	0.78%	116	121							
Electorate: 28,220 Valid: 14,806 Spoilt: 192 Quota: 2,116 Turnout: 14,998 (53.15%)

=== Bantry–West Cork ===
Bantry–West Cork: 4 Seats
Party	Candidate	FPv%	Count							
Party	Candidate	FPv%	1	2	3	4	5	6	7	8
Independent	Danny Collins	27.29%	3,148							
Fianna Fáil	Patrick Gerard Murphy	12.80%	1,477	1,652	1,682	1,830	2,293	2,782		
Social Democrats	Holly Cairns (Note: See change below.)	11.06%	1,276	1,361	1,460	1,510	1,584	1,777	1,843	1,866
Fianna Fáil	George Gill	9.92%	1,145	1,239	1,288	1,462	1,508			
Fine Gael	Katie Murphy	9.85%	1,136	1,272	1,319	1,539	1,917	2,292	2,376	
Independent	Finbarr Harrington	9.53%	1,100	1,233	1,300	1,439	1,624	1,777	1,852	1,865
Fine Gael	Noel Harrington	8.91%	1,028	1,073	1,084	1,291				
Fine Gael	John Dinneen	7.62%	879	987	1,007					
Sinn Féin	Donnchadh Ó Seaghdha	1.82%	210	236						
Aontú	Lorraine Deane-Ross	1.20%	138	176						
Electorate: 20,290 Valid: 11,537 (56.86%) Spoilt: 135 Quota: 2,308 Turnout: 11,672 (57.53%)

=== Carrigaline ===
Carrigaline: 6 Seats
Party	Candidate	FPv%	Count						
Party	Candidate	FPv%	1	2	3	4	5	6	7
Fianna Fáil	Séamus McGrath	32.48%	4,247						
Independent	Marcia D'Alton	15.98%	2,089						
Fine Gael	Aidan Lombard	14.49%	1,894						
Independent	Ben Dalton O'Sullivan	6.26%	818	1,032	1,054	1,198	1,234	1,272	1,447
Fine Gael	Liam O'Connor	6.00%	785	1,303	1,321	1,354	1,407	1,728	1,779
Green	Catriona Reid	5.56%	727	881	929	1,000	1,040	1,121	1,282
Fianna Fáil	Audrey Buckley	5.31%	694	1,282	1,293	1,346	1,622	1,817	1,913
Fine Gael	Michael Paul Murtagh	4.52%	591	771	794	815	851		
Sinn Féin	Michael Frick Murphy	4.44%	580	762	818	841	914	932	
Aontú	John Weldon	3.27%	427	520	530				
Fianna Fáil	Michael Corcoran	1.70%	222	672	705	729			
Electorate: 27,772 Valid: 13,074 Spoilt: 154 Quota: 1,868 Turnout: 13,098 (47.16%)

=== Cobh ===
Cobh: 6 Seats
Party	Candidate	FPv%	Count							
Party	Candidate	FPv%	1	2	3	4	5	6	7	8
Fianna Fáil	Pádraig O'Sullivan	21.82%	2,608							
Fine Gael	Anthony Barry	16.80%	2,009							
Labour	Cathal Rasmussen	12.97%	1,550	1,593	1,605	1,653	1,667	1,747		
Fine Gael	Sinéad Sheppard	11.46%	1,370	1,619	1,796					
Independent	Sean O'Connor	10.08%	1,205	1,229	1,239	1,256	1,267	1,392	1,501	1,662
Green	Alan O'Connor	7.39%	883	983	1,032	1,084	1,110	1,153	1,242	1,358
Inds. 4 Change	Karen Doyle	6.92%	827	844	853	903	912	972	1,138	1,252
Sinn Féin	Louise Murphy	4.29%	513	543	556	577	581	618		
Independent	Peter Kidney	3.34%	399	412	415	440	444			
Fianna Fáil	John Paul Reilly	2.93%	350	759	777	788	810	845	901	
Social Democrats	Ken Curtin	2.02%	241	256	266					
Electorate: 26,045 Valid: 11,955 Spoilt: 252 Quota: 1,708 Turnout: 12,207 (46.87%)

=== Fermoy ===
Fermoy: 6 Seats
Party	Candidate	FPv%	Count							
Party	Candidate	FPv%	1	2	3	4	5	6	7	8
Fine Gael	Noel McCarthy	21.80%	3,228							
Fianna Fáil	Frank O'Flynn	19.55%	2,895							
Fianna Fáil	Deirdre O'Brien	15.02%	2,225							
Fianna Fáil	William O'Leary	14.94%	2,212							
Fine Gael	Kay Dawson	10.31%	1,527	2,095	2,412					
Independent	Frank Roche	6.07%	899	1,014	1,231	1,278	1,315	1,515	1,560	1,780
Social Democrats	June Murphy	4.56%	676	777	857	896	923	1,116	1,137	1,456
Sinn Féin	Helen White	4.17%	617	696	769	790	818			
Labour	David Kenneally	3.59%	531	780	872	931	948	1,056	1,086	
Electorate: 29,888 Valid: 14,810 Spoilt: 259 Quota: 2,116 Turnout: 15,069 (50.42%)

=== Kanturk ===
Kanturk: 4 Seats
Party	Candidate	FPv%	Count	
Party	Candidate	FPv%	1	2
Fianna Fáil	Bernard Moynihan	26.15%	2,843	
Fianna Fáil	Ian Doyle	21.39%	2,325	
Fine Gael	John Paul O'Shea	21.29%	2,314	
Fine Gael	Gerard Murphy	18.26%	1,985	2,336
Aontú	Paddy Scully	4.56%	496	637
Sinn Féin	Lillian Meade	4.23%	460	570
Green	Ted Bradley	3.28%	356	397
Independent	Ado Mazombe	0.84%	91	116
Electorate: 21,110 Valid: 10,870 Spoilt: 204 Quota: 2,175 Turnout: 11,074 (52.46%)

=== Macroom ===
Macroom: 6 Seats
Party	Candidate	FPv%	Count										
Party	Candidate	FPv%	1	2	3	4	5	6	7	8	9	10	11
Fine Gael	Michael Creed	17.06%	2,954										
Fianna Fáil	Gobnait Moynihan	15.39%	2,665										
Fianna Fáil	Michael Looney	12.91%	2,234	2,250	2,259	2,300	2,351	2,633					
Fine Gael	Eileen Lynch	10.22%	1,770	1,857	1,870	1,880	1,898	1,947	1,972	2,046	2,282	2,422	2,473
Independent	Martin Coughlan	9.62%	1,666	1,759	1,834	1,879	1,954	2,005	2,043	2,195	2,432	2,787	
Fine Gael	Ted Lucey	8.39%	1,452	1,590	1,610	1,622	1,629	1,658	1,670	1,712	1,758	1,811	1,855
Fine Gael	Áine Collins	7.73%	1,338	1,410	1,420	1,434	1,450	1,513	1,535	1,568	1,608	1,687	1,725
Social Democrats	Síle Ní Dhubhghaill	4.14%	716	732	779	790	896	910	926	970	1,038		
Aontú	P.J. Feeney	3.48%	602	610	635	639	686	698	705				
Independent	Nigel Dennehy	3.37%	584	597	627	634	699	720	736	838			
Fianna Fáil	Jason Fitzgerald	3.04%	526	540	552	594	616						
Sinn Féin	Ronnie Morley	2.96%	512	517	537	542							
Independent	Mary O'Callaghan-Hallissey	1.69%	292	310									
Electorate: 30,607 Valid: 17,311 Spoilt: 288 Quota: 2,474 Turnout: 17,599 (57.5%)

=== Mallow ===
Mallow: 5 Seats
Party	Candidate	FPv%	Count				
Party	Candidate	FPv%	1	2	3	4	5
Fianna Fáil	Pat Hayes	17.30%	1,806				
Fianna Fáil	Gearóid Murphy	17.18%	1,794				
Labour	James Kennedy	17.17%	1,793				
Fine Gael	Tony O'Shea	16.18%	1,689	1,703	1,720	1,730	1,915
Fine Gael	Liam Madden	15.88%	1,658	1,682	1,697	1,711	1,916
Sinn Féin	Melissa Mullane	11.45%	1,196	1,214	1,229	1,249	1,301
Fine Gael	Cian Moriarty	4.85%	506	515	521	529	
Electorate: 21,949 Valid: 10,442 Spoilt: 254 Quota: 1,741 Turnout: 10,696 (48.73%)

=== Midleton ===
Midleton: 7 Seats
Party	Candidate	FPv%	Count									
Party	Candidate	FPv%	1	2	3	4	5	6	7	8	9	10
Independent	Mary Linehan Foley	17.80%	2,699									
Independent	Noel Collins	15.64%	2,371									
Fine Gael	Michael Hegarty	14.20%	2,154									
Fianna Fáil	James O'Connor	10.12%	1,535	1,777	1,824	1,874	1,892	1,947				
Sinn Féin	Danielle Twomey	9.91%	1,503	1,557	1,642	1,660	1,713	1,946				
Fine Gael	Susan McCarthy	8.31%	1,260	1,289	1,404	1,519	1,561	1,565	1,704	1,940		
Green	Liam Quaide	6.75%	1,024	1,065	1,104	1,113	1,163	1,185	1,362	1,483	1,495	1,536
Fianna Fáil	Rosarii Griffin	6.67%	1,012	1,058	1,144	1,173	1,201	1,210	1,308	1,410	1,420	1,429
Labour	Eric Nolan	3.26%	494	515	550	559	597	610				
Fine Gael	John Phillips	3.24%	492	751	762	781	788	818	854			
Sinn Féin	Shane Neville	2.14%	324	397	411	414	425					
Independent	Martin Murray	1.95%	296	334	377	383						
Electorate: 33,436 Valid: 15,164 Spoilt: 234 Quota: 1,896 Turnout: 15,398 (46.05%)

=== Skibbereen–West Cork ===
Skibbereen–West Cork:— 5 Seats
Party	Candidate	FPv%	Count									
Party	Candidate	FPv%	1	2	3	4	5	6	7	8	9	10
Fianna Fáil	Christopher O'Sullivan	19.54%	2,703									
Fianna Fáil	Joe Carroll	16.51%	2,284	2,364								
Independent	Declan Hurley	11.82%	1,635	1,666	1,679	1,742	1,787	1,850	2,017	2,181	2,861	
Fine Gael	Karen Coakley	8.84%	1,222	1,236	1,248	1,260	1,296	1,426	1,691	1,821	1,903	1,958
Fianna Fáil	Deirdre Kelly	7.91%	1,094	1,138	1,140	1,150	1,163	1,181	1,263	1,304		
Fine Gael	J.J. Walsh	7.55%	1,044	1,105	1,109	1,137	1,174	1,189	1,339	1,463	1,536	1,611
Sinn Féin	Paul Hayes	7.10%	982	1,060	1,086	1,143	1,226	1,353	1,396	1,610	1,707	1,814
Fine Gael	Yvonne Cahalane	5.46%	755	769	773	783	819	843				
Independent	Yousuf Janab Ali	4.32%	597	631	662	696	823	1,005	1,052			
Independent	Brendan McCormack	4.13%	571	579	599	612	700					
Social Democrats	Evie Nevin	3.33%	460	477	533	552						
Aontú	Séan Creedon	2.14%	296	307	313							
People Before Profit	Vanessa O'Sullivan	1.36%	188	193								
Electorate: 25,355 Valid: 13,831 Spoilt: 155 Quota: 2,306 Turnout: 13,986 (55.16%)

== Changes ==
=== Co-options ===
Party	Outgoing	LEA	Reason	Date	Co-optee
Fianna Fáil	Pádraig O'Sullivan	Cobh	Elected to 32nd Dáil at the 2019 Cork North-Central by-election	24 February 2020	Sheila O'Callaghan
Fianna Fáil	James O'Connor	Midleton	Elected to 33rd Dáil for Cork East at the 2020 general election	24 February 2020	Ann Marie Ahern
Social Democrats	Holly Cairns	Bantry–West Cork	Elected to 33rd Dáil for Cork South-West at the 2020 general election	24 February 2020	Ross O'Connell
Fianna Fáil	Christopher O'Sullivan	Skibbereen–West Cork	Elected to 33rd Dáil for Cork South-West at the 2020 general election	24 February 2020	Deirdre Kelly
Fine Gael	Aidan Lombard	Carrigaline	Job commitments	26 June 2021	Michael Paul Murtagh
Fine Gael	Liam O'Connor	Carrigaline	Work commitments	22 November 2021	Jack White
Fine Gael	Katie Murphy	Bantry–West Cork	Work commitments	15 November 2021	Caroline Cronin O'Driscoll
Independent	Noel Collins	Midleton	Death.	13 July 2022	John Healy
Fine Gael	Michael Paul Murtagh	Carrigaline	Resignation.	24 October 2023	Úna McCarthy
Social Democrats	Ross O'Connell	Bantry–West Cork	Resigned	January 2024	Chris Heinhold
Labour	James Kennedy	Mallow	Resigned	February 2024	Eoghan Kenny
Fine Gael	Gerard Murphy	Kanturk	Death of councillor	April 2024	Vacant

=== Changes in affiliation ===
Name	LEA	Elected as	New affiliation	Date
Paul Hayes	Skibbereen–West Cork	Sinn Féin	Independent	May 2020
Karen Coakley	Skibbereen–West Cork	Fine Gael	Independent	April 2022
Liam Quaide	Midleton	Green	Independent	April 2023
Liam Quaide	Midleton	Independent	Social Democrats	November 2023
Danielle Twomey	Midleton	Sinn Féin	Independent	December 2023
William O'Leary	Fermoy	Fianna Fáil	Independent	March 2024
Danny Collins	Bantry–West Cork	Independent	Independent Ireland	April 2024

== Sources ==
- "Cork County Council - Local Election candidates". RTÉ. 8 May 2019. Archived from the original on 4 June 2021.
- "Local Elections 2019". Cork County Council. Archived from the original on 5 September 2020.
- "Local Elections 2019: Results, Transfer of Votes and Statistics" (PDF). Department of Housing, Planning and Local Government (DHPLG). pp. 77–88. Archived from the original (PDF) on 10 June 2020.
