= 2014 Cork County Council election =

Part of the 2014 Irish local elections

- 23 May 2014

All 55 seats on Cork County Council 28 seats needed for a majority
| | First party | Second party | Third party |
|---|---|---|---|
| Party | Fianna Fáil | Fine Gael | Sinn Féin |
| Seats won | 17 | 16 | 10 |
| Seat change | ▲5 | ▼6 | ▲9 |
| Popular vote | 44,885 | 43,350 | 22,747 |
| Percentage | 28.65% | 27.67% | 14.52% |
| Swing | ▼4.28% | ▼9.52% | ▲8.38% |
| | Fourth party | Fifth party |
| Party | Labour | Independent |
| Seats won | 2 | 10 |
| Seat change | ▼5 | ▲4 |
| Popular vote | 11,298 | 30,336 |
| Percentage | 7.21% | 19.36% |
| Swing | ▼2.98% | ▲11.4% |
Cathaoirleach before election
Noel O'Connor
Fine Gael
Subsequent Cathaoirleach
Alan Coleman
Fianna Fáil

The area governed by Cork County Council

An election to all 55 seats on Cork County Council was held on 23 May 2014 as part of the 2014 Irish local elections, contested by a field of 114 candidates. County Cork was divided into 8 local electoral areas to elect councillors for a five-year term of office on the electoral system of proportional representation by means of the single transferable vote (PR-STV).

Cork County Council was expanded by seven seats to a total of 55 members for the 2014 elections. Fianna Fáil emerged after the local elections as the largest party in Cork for the first time since 1991, having won 17 seats and 5 gains in total. The party won three seats in each of Ballincollig-Carrigaline, Fermoy and West Cork and took two seats in Bandon-Kinsale, Blarney-Macroom and Kanturk-Mallow. Fine Gael lost 6 seats in all to emerge with 16 seats. The party's best results were in Ballincollig-Carrigaline and Bandon-Kinsale where they won 3 seats and Blarney-Macroom, Cobh, East Cork and West Cork where they won 2 seats. Sinn Féin won 10 seats in total, including 9 gains, with the party's best results coming in Ballincollig-Carrigaline and Cobh where they won 2 seats each. Labour had a very bad election losing 5 seats and returning with just 2 seats. Independents gained 4 seats, bringing their total to 10 seats.

== Results by party ==
| Party | Seats | ± | 1st pref | FPv% |
|---|---|---|---|---|
| Fianna Fáil | 17 | ▲5 | 44,885 | 28.65 |
| Fine Gael | 16 | ▼6 | 43,350 | 27.67 |
| Sinn Féin | 10 | ▲9 | 22,747 | 14.52 |
| Labour | 2 | ▼5 | 11,298 | 7.21 |
| Independent | 10 | ▲4 | 30,336 | 19.36 |
| Total | 55 | ▲7 | 156,655 | 100.00 |

== Results by local electoral area ==
*: Outgoing councillor.

=== Ballincollig–Carrigaline ===
Ballincollig–Carrigaline: 10 seats
| Party | Candidate | FPv% | Count | | | | | | | | | | | | | | |
| Party | Candidate | FPv% | 1 | 2 | 3 | 4 | 5 | 6 | 7 | 8 | 9 | 10 | 11 | 12 | 13 | 14 | 15 |
|---|---|---|---|---|---|---|---|---|---|---|---|---|---|---|---|---|---|
| Fianna Fáil | Séamus McGrath | 20.13 | 4,700 | | | | | | | | | | | | | | |
| Sinn Féin | Donnchadh Ó Laoghaire | 10.99 | 2,567 | | | | | | | | | | | | | | |
| Fine Gael | Derry Canty | 6.51 | 1,521 | 1,559 | 1,570 | 1,570 | 1,574 | 1,595 | 1,603 | 1,610 | 1,652 | 1,671 | 1,710 | 1,711 | 1,831 | 1,906 | 1,963 |
| Fine Gael | Deirdre Forde | 6.23 | 1,455 | 1,678 | 1,683 | 1,685 | 1,704 | 1,791 | 1,801 | 1,813 | 1,875 | 1,887 | 1,970 | 1,977 | 2,073 | 2,491 | |
| Fianna Fáil | Daithi O Donnabhain | 6.04 | 1,411 | 1,839 | 1,852 | 1,853 | 1,858 | 1,861 | 1,865 | 1,872 | 1,896 | 1,911 | 1,936 | 1,938 | 2,040 | 2,095 | 2,103 |
| Independent | Marcia D'Alton | 5.74 | 1,341 | 1,557 | 1,566 | 1,582 | 1,630 | 1,640 | 1,723 | 1,806 | 1,860 | 1,997 | 2,220 | | | | |
| Fine Gael | Garret Kelleher | 5.48 | 1,279 | 1,307 | 1,313 | 1,313 | 1,317 | 1,342 | 1,345 | 1,352 | 1,386 | 1,413 | 1,430 | 1,431 | 1,548 | 1,680 | 1,727 |
| Fine Gael | John A. Collins | 5.43 | 1,269 | 1,520 | 1,523 | 1,538 | 1,543 | 1,566 | 1,579 | 1,593 | 1,668 | 1,674 | 1,708 | 1,709 | 1,749 | 1,846 | 1,934 |
| Fine Gael | Shane O'Callaghan | 4.37 | 1,020 | 1,133 | 1,141 | 1,142 | 1,145 | 1,194 | 1,197 | 1,202 | 1,243 | 1,247 | 1,305 | 1,308 | 1,369 | | |
| Fianna Fáil | Mary Rose Desmond | 4.36 | 1,019 | 1,608 | 1,616 | 1,617 | 1,620 | 1,634 | 1,640 | 1,649 | 1,672 | 1,679 | 1,773 | 1,782 | 1,828 | 1,975 | 2,019 |
| Sinn Féin | Michael Murphy | 3.91 | 914 | 1,071 | 1,357 | 1,368 | 1,401 | 1,403 | 1,474 | 1,573 | 1,604 | 1,631 | 1,684 | 1,697 | 1,786 | 1,810 | 1,811 |
| Green | Cormac Manning | 3.81 | 890 | 946 | 962 | 965 | 973 | 998 | 1,010 | 1,056 | 1,134 | 1,199 | 1,237 | 1,245 | | | |
| Independent | David Boyle | 3.48 | 813 | 908 | 923 | 931 | 934 | 943 | 971 | 1,017 | 1,040 | 1,105 | | | | | |
| Independent | Joe Harris | 3.01 | 702 | 784 | 795 | 828 | 834 | 836 | 901 | 955 | 974 | 1,172 | 1,359 | 1,461 | 1,618 | 1,712 | 1,739 |
| Independent | Shirley Griffin | 2.02 | 472 | 494 | 509 | 557 | 559 | 570 | 629 | 699 | 713 | | | | | | |
| People Before Profit | Rob Galligan Long | 1.96 | 458 | 494 | 510 | 524 | 532 | 538 | 579 | | | | | | | | |
| Labour | Liam O'Connor | 1.73 | 403 | 475 | 481 | 485 | 609 | 627 | 635 | 654 | | | | | | | |
| Independent | Elizabeth Hourihane | 1.57 | 366 | 432 | 438 | 471 | 483 | 485 | | | | | | | | | |
| Fine Gael | Farah Deeba | 1.34 | 312 | 333 | 337 | 339 | 344 | | | | | | | | | | |
| Labour | Angela Murphy | 1.10 | 258 | 315 | 316 | 316 | | | | | | | | | | | |
| Independent | Terry Hume | 0.78 | 181 | 208 | 213 | | | | | | | | | | | | |
Electorate: 51,714 Valid: 23,351 (45.15%) Spoilt: 341 Quota: 2,123 Turnout: 23,692 (45.81%)

=== Bandon–Kinsale ===
Bandon-Kinsale: 6 seats
| Party | Candidate | FPv% | Count | | | | | | | |
| Party | Candidate | FPv% | 1 | 2 | 3 | 4 | 5 | 6 | 7 | 8 |
|---|---|---|---|---|---|---|---|---|---|---|
| Sinn Féin | Rachel McCarthy | 14.68 | 2,344 | | | | | | | |
| Fianna Fáil | Alan Coleman | 14.33 | 2,288 | | | | | | | |
| Fine Gael | Tim Lombard | 13.87 | 2,214 | 2,217 | 2,224 | 2,225 | 2,247 | 2,392 | | |
| Fianna Fáil | Margaret Murphy O'Mahony | 12.89 | 2,057 | 2,069 | 2,081 | 2,084 | 2,173 | 2,233 | 2,249 | 2,349 |
| Fine Gael | James O'Donovan | 12.37 | 1,975 | 1,982 | 1,986 | 1,986 | 2,045 | 2,079 | 2,089 | 2,222 |
| Fine Gael | Kevin Murphy | 10.46 | 1,670 | 1,675 | 1,708 | 1,709 | 1,738 | 1,781 | 1,827 | 2,368 |
| Labour | Tomas O'Brien | 6.87 | 1,097 | 1,101 | 1,156 | 1,157 | 1,188 | 1,294 | 1,312 | |
| Independent | Michael Ring | 5.96 | 951 | 963 | 1,009 | 1,010 | 1,208 | 1,339 | 1,352 | 1,532 |
| Green | Liz Dunphy | 3.63 | 579 | 586 | 599 | 599 | 671 | | | |
| Independent | Denis Boyle | 3.47 | 554 | 564 | 596 | | | | | |
| Independent | Cormac Hayes | 1.47 | 235 | 238 | | | | | | |
Electorate: 31,472 Valid: 15,964 (50.72%) Spoilt: 201 Quota: 2,281 Turnout: 16,165 (51.36%)

=== Blarney–Macroom ===
Blarney–Macroom: 6 seats
| Party | Candidate | FPv% | Count | | | | | | | | |
| Party | Candidate | FPv% | 1 | 2 | 3 | 4 | 5 | 6 | 7 | 8 | 9 |
|---|---|---|---|---|---|---|---|---|---|---|---|
| Fianna Fáil | Aindrias Moynihan | 20.19 | 3,816 | | | | | | | | |
| Fine Gael | Michael Creed | 18.02 | 3,406 | | | | | | | | |
| Sinn Féin | Des O'Grady | 13.97 | 2,639 | 2,777 | | | | | | | |
| Fine Gael | Damian Boylan | 8.83 | 1,584 | 1,621 | 1,732 | 1,743 | 1,773 | 1,776 | 1,811 | 1,847 | 2,043 |
| Fianna Fáil | Bob Ryan | 7.99 | 1,509 | 1,961 | 1,989 | 2,011 | 2,036 | 2,062 | 2,110 | 2,214 | 2,336 |
| Independent | Kevin Conway | 7.20 | 1,361 | 1,383 | 1,389 | 1,415 | 1,541 | 1,548 | 1,686 | 2,018 | 2,154 |
| Fine Gael | Ted Lucey | 6.52 | 1,233 | 1,314 | 1,628 | 1,651 | 1,659 | 1,664 | 1,751 | 1,857 | 2,348 |
| Labour | Martin Coughlan | 5.74 | 1,085 | 1,232 | 1,338 | 1,372 | 1,420 | 1,427 | 1,646 | 1,805 | |
| Independent | Connie Foley | 3.84 | 726 | 795 | 835 | 914 | 1,017 | 1,025 | | | |
| Independent | Jerry O'Sullivan | 3.70 | 699 | 805 | 867 | 947 | 1,036 | 1,055 | 1,273 | | |
| Anti-Austerity Alliance | Liz Feehan | 2.77 | 524 | 543 | 549 | 588 | | | | | |
| Independent | Mary O'Callaghan-Hallissey | 1.67 | 315 | 360 | 393 | | | | | | |
Electorate: 34,079 Valid: 18,897 (55.45%) Spoilt: 245 Quota: 2,700 Turnout: 19,142 (56.17%)

=== Cobh ===
Cobh: 7 seats
| Party | Candidate | FPv% | Count | | | | | | | |
| Party | Candidate | FPv% | 1 | 2 | 3 | 4 | 5 | 6 | 7 | 8 |
|---|---|---|---|---|---|---|---|---|---|---|
| Fianna Fáil | Pádraig O'Sullivan | 14.72 | 2,628 | | | | | | | |
| Sinn Féin | Kieran McCarthy | 13.84 | 2,471 | | | | | | | |
| Sinn Féin | Ger Keohane | 12.40 | 2,214 | 2,244 | | | | | | |
| Fine Gael | Anthony Barry | 8.86 | 1,583 | 1,605 | 1,605 | 1,610 | 1,620 | 1,637 | 1,739 | 2,010 |
| Fine Gael | Conor Murphy | 8.04 | 1,436 | 1,465 | 1,466 | 1,469 | 1,488 | 1,496 | 1,618 | 1,701 |
| Fine Gael | Sinead Sheppard | 7.43 | 1,327 | 1,372 | 1,398 | 1,422 | 1,460 | 1,519 | 1,869 | 2,067 |
| Labour | Cathal Rasmussen | 7.08 | 1,264 | 1,272 | 1,309 | 1,352 | 1,366 | 1,485 | 1,718 | 1,869 |
| Labour | Noel Costello | 7.06 | 1,261 | 1,299 | 1,301 | 1,304 | 1,349 | 1,356 | | |
| Fianna Fáil | Michael Ahern | 7.01 | 1,251 | 1,434 | 1,441 | 1,465 | 1,477 | 1,518 | 1,596 | |
| Independent | Claire Cullinane | 6.30 | 947 | 962 | 1,026 | 1,082 | 1,288 | 1,687 | 1,761 | 1,934 |
| Independent | Paddy Histon | 3.53 | 631 | 636 | 700 | 765 | 910 | | | |
| Independent | Seán O'Sullivan | 3.20 | 572 | 590 | 618 | 636 | | | | |
| Independent | Noel Maguire | 1.52 | 272 | 274 | 274 | | | | | |
Electorate: 39,323 Valid: 17,857 (45.41%) Spoilt: 317 Quota: 2,233 Turnout: 18,174 (46.22%)

=== East Cork ===
East Cork: 6 seats
| Party | Candidate | FPv% | Count | | | | | | | | | |
| Party | Candidate | FPv% | 1 | 2 | 3 | 4 | 5 | 6 | 7 | 8 | 9 | 10 |
|---|---|---|---|---|---|---|---|---|---|---|---|---|
| Independent | Noel Collins | 15.66 | 2,267 | | | | | | | | | |
| Sinn Féin | Pat Buckley | 12.11 | 1,753 | 1,755 | 1,797 | 1,828 | 1,889 | 1,991 | 2,019 | 2,173 | | |
| Fine Gael | Michael Hegarty | 10.05 | 1,455 | 1,458 | 1,478 | 1,484 | 1,553 | 1,640 | 1,897 | 2,041 | 2,099 | |
| Fianna Fáil | Aaron O'Sullivan | 9.24 | 1,337 | 1,342 | 1,349 | 1,368 | 1,388 | 1,416 | 1,658 | 2,280 | | |
| Sinn Féin | Michelle Hennessy | 9.33 | 1,350 | 1,354 | 1,365 | 1,416 | 1,457 | 1,516 | 1,578 | 1,622 | 1,662 | 1,690 |
| Fianna Fáil | Niall O'Neill | 8.68 | 1,257 | 1,258 | 1,287 | 1,291 | 1,339 | 1,444 | 1,515 | | | |
| Fine Gael | Barbara Murray | 7.86 | 1,138 | 1,139 | 1,146 | 1,155 | 1,198 | 1,234 | | | | |
| Independent | Mary Linehan-Foley | 7.83 | 1,134 | 1,157 | 1,169 | 1,229 | 1,281 | 1,455 | 1,675 | 1,733 | 1,797 | 1,809 |
| Fine Gael | Susan McCarthy | 7.10 | 1,028 | 1,035 | 1,058 | 1,060 | 1,202 | 1,297 | 1,538 | 1,766 | 1,816 | 1,844 |
| Independent | Wayne Halloran | 5.15 | 745 | 756 | 781 | 848 | 906 | | | | | |
| Labour | Eric Nolan | 2.34 | 338 | 339 | 345 | 348 | | | | | | |
| Green | Natasha Harty | 1.67 | 301 | 305 | 316 | 334 | | | | | | |
| Independent | Paddy Bullman | 1.98 | 287 | 299 | 305 | | | | | | | |
| Independent | Aisling Murray | 0.59 | 85 | | | | | | | | | |
Electorate: 30,579 Valid: 14,475 (47.34%) Spoilt: 190 Quota: 2,068 Turnout: 14,665 (47.96%)

=== Fermoy ===
Fermoy: 6 seats
| Party | Candidate | FPv% | Count | | | | | | | | |
| Party | Candidate | FPv% | 1 | 2 | 3 | 4 | 5 | 6 | 7 | 8 | 9 |
|---|---|---|---|---|---|---|---|---|---|---|---|
| Labour | Noel McCarthy | 20.02 | 3,511 | | | | | | | | |
| Fianna Fáil | Kevin O'Keeffe | 16.67 | 2,923 | | | | | | | | |
| Fianna Fáil | Frank O'Flynn | 14.01 | 2,457 | 2,839 | | | | | | | |
| Fianna Fáil | Ian Doyle | 12.58 | 2,206 | 2,221 | 2,346 | 2,367 | 2,377 | 2,427 | 2,450 | 2,466 | 2,731 |
| Sinn Féin | June Murphy | 9.55 | 1,675 | 1,857 | 1,909 | 1,946 | 1,964 | 2,076 | 2,164 | 2,381 | 2,408 |
| Fine Gael | Kay Dawson | 9.23 | 1,618 | 1,775 | 1,860 | 1,909 | 1,914 | 1,933 | 1,985 | 2,079 | 2,691 |
| Fine Gael | Aileen Browne | 5.63 | 988 | 1,047 | 1,070 | 1,083 | 1,092 | 1,120 | 1,154 | 1,160 | |
| Independent | Frank Roche | 4.24 | 743 | 803 | 859 | 886 | 928 | 1,003 | 1,145 | 1,240 | 1,308 |
| Independent | Tim White | 2.71 | 475 | 516 | 550 | 569 | 578 | 617 | 663 | | |
| People Before Profit | Michael McCarthy | 2.32 | 406 | 446 | 454 | 461 | 470 | | | | |
| Independent | Pat Fouhy | 2.26 | 396 | 448 | 478 | 497 | 534 | 573 | | | |
| Independent | Ross Cannon | 0.79 | 138 | 155 | 159 | 160 | | | | | |
Electorate: 32,812 Valid: 17,536 (53.44%) Spoilt: 284 Quota: 2,506 Turnout: 17,820 (54.31%)

=== Kanturk–Mallow ===
Kanturk-Mallow: 6 seats
| Party | Candidate | FPv% | Count | | | | | | | |
| Party | Candidate | FPv% | 1 | 2 | 3 | 4 | 5 | 6 | 7 | 8 |
|---|---|---|---|---|---|---|---|---|---|---|
| Independent | John Paul O'Shea | 20.53 | 4,374 | | | | | | | |
| Fianna Fáil | Bernard Moynihan | 11.65 | 2,481 | 2,568 | 2,636 | 2,914 | 2,935 | 2,956 | 3,231 | |
| Fianna Fáil | Dan Joe Fitzgerald | 10.66 | 2,271 | 2,510 | 2,546 | 2,915 | 3,240 | | | |
| Sinn Féin | Melissa Mullane | 10.11 | 2,154 | 2,365 | 2,497 | 2,610 | 2,715 | 2,732 | 2,840 | 2,877 |
| Fine Gael | Gerard Murphy | 9.81 | 2,090 | 2,156 | 2,223 | 2,356 | 2,631 | 2,653 | 3,551 | |
| Independent | Timmy Collins | 8.35 | 1,779 | 1,961 | 2,191 | 2,317 | 2,354 | 2,364 | 2,680 | 2,862 |
| Fine Gael | Noel Buckley | 7.70 | 1,641 | 1,694 | 1,709 | 1,742 | 1,935 | 1,949 | | |
| Labour | Ronan Sheehan | 6.25 | 1,332 | 1,499 | 1,537 | 1,583 | 1,954 | 2,066 | 2,136 | 2,346 |
| Fine Gael | Noel O'Connor | 6.11 | 1,302 | 1,442 | 1,458 | 1,474 | | | | |
| Fianna Fáil | Bart Donegan | 5.78 | 1,231 | 1,258 | 1,276 | | | | | |
| Independent | Dennis O'Brien | 2.37 | 505 | 610 | | | | | | |
| Independent | Grzegorz Zalewski | 0.66 | 141 | 194 | | | | | | |
Electorate: 37,129 Valid: 21,301 (57.37%) Spoilt: 303 Quota: 3,044 Turnout: 21,604 (58.19%)

=== West Cork ===
West Cork: 8 seats
| Party | Candidate | FPv% | Count | | | | | | | | | | | |
| Party | Candidate | FPv% | 1 | 2 | 3 | 4 | 5 | 6 | 7 | 8 | 9 | 10 | 11 | 12 |
|---|---|---|---|---|---|---|---|---|---|---|---|---|---|---|
| Independent | Michael Collins | 12.50 | 3,409 | | | | | | | | | | | |
| Fine Gael | Noel O'Donovan | 9.29 | 2,534 | 2,535 | 2,540 | 2,632 | 2,657 | 2,684 | 2,791 | 2,884 | 2,999 | 3,010 | 3,256 | |
| Fianna Fáil | Joe Carroll | 7.46 | 2,035 | 2,038 | 2,063 | 2,117 | 2,120 | 2,158 | 2,395 | 2,486 | 2,596 | 2,780 | 3,272 | |
| Fianna Fáil | Christopher O'Sullivan | 7.03 | 1,916 | 1,916 | 1,923 | 1,953 | 1,957 | 1,989 | 2,183 | 2,216 | 2,780 | 2,833 | 2,929 | 3,006 |
| Fianna Fáil | Patrick Murphy | 6.63 | 1,807 | 1,809 | 1,852 | 1,868 | 2,172 | 2,195 | 2,325 | 2,417 | 2,466 | 2,501 | 2,519 | 2,523 |
| Sinn Féin | Paul Hayes | 5.55 | 1,514 | 1,516 | 1,533 | 1,565 | 1,572 | 1,681 | 1,714 | 1,733 | 1,842 | 2,480 | 2,513 | 2,530 |
| Fine Gael | John O'Sullivan | 5.39 | 1,469 | 1,469 | 1,471 | 1,494 | 1,521 | 1,540 | 1,544 | 1,649 | 1,811 | 1,824 | 1,936 | 1,959 |
| Independent | Declan Hurley | 5.25 | 1,431 | 1,444 | 1,467 | 1,656 | 1,661 | 1,782 | 1,990 | 2,025 | 2,059 | 2,119 | 2,189 | 2,220 |
| Fine Gael | Mary Hegarty | 5.22 | 1,425 | 1,427 | 1,470 | 1,506 | 1,642 | 1,700 | 1,735 | 2,055 | 2,066 | 2,105 | 2,468 | 2,541 |
| Fine Gael | Adrian Healy | 5.14 | 1,401 | 1,403 | 1,418 | 1,434 | 1,458 | 1,501 | 1,511 | 1,655 | 1,678 | 1,779 | | |
| Independent | Finbarr Harrington | 4.49 | 1,225 | 1,241 | 1,289 | 1,313 | 1,502 | 1,645 | 1,696 | 1,788 | 1,794 | 1,863 | 1,910 | 1,926 |
| Fianna Fáil | Donal O'Rourke | 4.37 | 1,192 | 1,194 | 1,197 | 1,208 | 1,208 | 1,224 | 1,305 | 1,311 | | | | |
| Sinn Féin | Donnchadh O Seaghdha | 4.22 | 1,152 | 1,153 | 1,178 | 1,198 | 1,211 | 1,314 | 1,340 | 1,394 | 1,402 | | | |
| Fianna Fáil | Deirdre Kelly | 4.01 | 1,093 | 1,095 | 1,105 | 1,163 | 1,174 | 1,192 | | | | | | |
| Fine Gael | Dermot Sheehan | 3.75 | 1,024 | 1,027 | 1,094 | 1,119 | 1,262 | 1,277 | 1,284 | | | | | |
| Fine Gael | Jerry Sullivan | 3.49 | 953 | 955 | 958 | 968 | | | | | | | | |
| People Before Profit | Ed Harper | 3.23 | 881 | 884 | 920 | 969 | 980 | | | | | | | |
| Labour | Norma Thomson | 2.75 | 749 | 832 | 838 | 871 | 983 | 985 | | | | | | |
| Independent | Michael O'Sullivan | 0.23 | 64 | 64 | 337 | 339 | 344 | | | | | | | |
Electorate: 46,249 Valid: 27,274 (58.97%) Spoilt: 382 Quota: 3,031 Turnout: 27,656 (59.80%)

== Changes ==
=== Co-options ===
| Party | Outgoing | LEA | Reason | Date | Co-optee |
|---|---|---|---|---|---|
| Fianna Fáil | Dan Joe Fitzgerald | Kanturk-Mallow | Death | 8 March 2016 | Daniel Fitzgerald |
| Fianna Fáil | Daniel Fitzgerald | Kanturk-Mallow | Work Commitments | 2016 | Gearóid Murphy |
| Sinn Féin | Donnchadh Ó Laoghaire | Ballincollig-Carrigaline | Elected to the 32nd Dáil at the 2016 general election. | 26 February 2016 | Eoghan Jeffers |
| Fianna Fáil | Margaret Murphy O'Mahony | Bandon-Kinsale | Elected to the 32nd Dáil at the 2016 general election. | 26 February 2016 | Gillian Coughlan |
| Fianna Fáil | Aindrias Moynihan | Blarney-Macroom | Elected to the 32nd Dáil at the 2016 general election. | 26 February 2016 | Gobnait Moynihan |
| Sinn Féin | Pat Buckley | East Cork | Elected to the 32nd Dáil at the 2016 general election. | 26 February 2016 | Danielle Twomey |
| Fianna Fáil | Kevin O'Keeffe | Fermoy | Elected to the 32nd Dáil at the 2016 general election. | 26 February 2016 | Deirdre O'Brien |
| Independent | Michael Collins | West Cork | Elected to the 32nd Dáil at the 2016 general election. | 26 February 2016 | Danny Collins |
| Fine Gael | Tim Lombard | Bandon-Kinsale | Elected to 25th Seanad at the 2016 Seanad election. | 26 February 2016 | Aidan Lombard |
| Independent | Claire Cullinane | Cobh | Death | 14 December 2016 | Diarmaid Ó'Cadhla |
| Fine Gael | Noel O'Donovan | West Cork | Resigned seat to join An Garda Síochána | January 2017 | John O'Sullivan |
| Fianna Fáil | Aaron O'Sullivan | East Cork | Work Commitments | 24 November 2017 | Michael Ahern |

=== Changes in affiliation ===
| Name | LEA | Elected as | New affiliation | Date |
|---|---|---|---|---|
| Kieran McCarthy | Cobh | Sinn Féin | Independent | 22 June 2015 |
| Melissa Mullane | Kanturk-Mallow | Sinn Féin | Independent | 22 June 2015 |
| Alan Coleman | Bandon-Kinsale | Fianna Fáil | Independent | 25 June 2015 |
| Melissa Mullane | Kanturk-Mallow | Independent | Sinn Féin | September 2015 |
| June Murphy | Fermoy | Sinn Féin | Independent | 24 September 2015 |
| Noel McCarthy | Fermoy | Labour | Independent | 7 October 2015 |
| Ger Keohane | Cobh | Sinn Féin | Independent | 13 November 2015 |
| Noel McCarthy | Fermoy | Independent | Fine Gael | 27 November 2015 |
| Joe Harris | Ballincollig-Carrigaline | Independent | Social Democrats | 1 March 2017 |
| June Murphy | Fermoy | Independent | Social Democrats | 20 February 2018 |
| John Paul O'Shea | Kanturk-Mallow | Independent | Fine Gael | 27 February 2018 |
