= Batt O'Keeffe =

Irish former politician (born 1945)

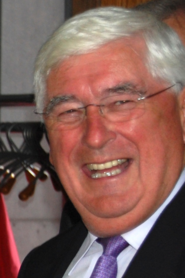

Minister for Enterprise, Trade and Innovation
- In office 23 March 2010 – 20 January 2011
- Taoiseach: Brian Cowen
- Preceded by: Mary Coughlan
- Succeeded by: Mary Hanafin

Minister for Education and Science
- In office 7 May 2008 – 23 March 2010
- Taoiseach: Brian Cowen
- Preceded by: Mary Hanafin
- Succeeded by: Mary Coughlan

Minister of State
- 2004–2008: Environment, Heritage and Local Government

Teachta Dála
- In office May 2007 – February 2011
- Constituency: Cork North-West
- In office November 1992 – May 2007
- In office February 1987 – June 1989
- Constituency: Cork South-Central

Senator
- In office 1 November 1989 – 25 November 1992
- Constituency: Labour Panel

Personal details
- Born: Bartholomew O'Keeffe; 2 April 1945 (age 81) Cullen, County Cork, Ireland
- Party: Fianna Fáil
- Spouse: Mary Murphy (m. 1982)
- Children: 4
- Education: University College Cork

Bartholomew O'Keeffe (born 2 April 1945) is an Irish former Fianna Fáil politician who served as Minister for Enterprise, Trade and Innovation from 2010 to 2011, Minister for Education and Science from 2008 to 2010 and a Minister of State from 2004 to 2008. He served as a Teachta Dála (TD) from 1987 to 1989 and from 1992 to 2011. He was a Senator for the Labour Panel from 1989 to 1992.

== Early life and education ==
O'Keeffe was born in Cullen, County Cork on 2 April 1945. He was educated at St. Brendan's College, Killarney and at University College Cork, where he received a Bachelor of Arts. O'Keeffe worked as a lecturer in the Cork Institute of Technology before becoming involved in politics. He also had a sporting career, being the holder of three Munster football Gaelic Athletic Association medals with Cork GAA at Under 21, Junior and Senior level. He was also a Cork Intermediate Handball Champion. In 1985, he was elected to Cork County Council. He was formerly chairman of the Southern Health Board. He is married to Mary Murphy; they have three daughters and one son.

== Political career ==
O'Keeffe was first elected to the Dáil at the 1987 general election as a Fianna Fáil TD for the Cork South-Central constituency. He lost his seat to Micheál Martin at the 1989 general election, but he was subsequently elected to Seanad Éireann on the Labour Panel where he was Fianna Fáil Spokesperson for Finance. At the 1992 general election, O'Keeffe was re-elected to the Dáil and was re-elected at each subsequent election until his retirement in 2011. Between 1995 and 1997, O'Keeffe was Opposition Spokesperson on Transport and Communications. He has also served on a number of committees including the Joint Oireachtas Committee on Health and Children, the Public Accounts Committee and the Sustainable Development Committee. In a 2004 reshuffle, Bertie Ahern appointed O'Keeffe as Minister of State at the Department of the Environment, Heritage and Local Government with special responsibility for Environmental Protection.

In 2006, O'Keeffe was selected unopposed to contest the 2007 general election in the re-drawn Cork North-West constituency, along with Michael Moynihan and Donal Moynihan. O'Keeffe was elected, although his party colleague Donal Moynihan lost his seat. In 2007, O'Keeffe was appointed as Minister of State at the Department of the Environment, Heritage and Local Government with special responsibility for Housing and Urban Renewal. When Brian Cowen became Taoiseach in 2008, O'Keeffe was appointed as Minister for Education and Science. In this role, in 2010 he initiated a process of dissolving the National University of Ireland, a move that was later reversed in 2011 by the Fine Gael/Labour coalition.

== Budget 2009 ==
On 14 October 2008, as part of Budget 2009, O'Keeffe announced cutbacks and the imposition of increased charges to pay for the running of the Department of Education and Science throughout 2009, including the increase of the primary school teacher:pupil ratio 1:27 to 1:28 and the increase of the post-primary school teacher:pupil ratio from 1:18 to 1:19, although the capital allocation of €889m was increased by €80m.

On 29 October 2008, approximately 12,000 teachers and parents demonstrated against the education cuts announced in Budget 2009. The rally outside Leinster House coincided with a Dáil debate on a Labour Party motion calling for the increase in class sizes to be reversed. INTO General Secretary John Carr described the budget as an act of educational sabotage. Ferdia Kelly, representing most second-level school managers, said school principals and deputy principals "are saying loudly and clearly that they are not available to supervise classes where teachers are absent. Failure to act now on this proposal will lead to an unwelcome disruption of school life in January." The cutbacks removed substitution cover for uncertified sick leave, and for teachers on school business at second level, from 7 January 2009.

The education cutbacks were supported in the Dáil on 30 October 2008 by Fianna Fáil and the Green Party. O'Keeffe accused the opposition parties of whipping up "hysteria" and said they were being dishonest with the Irish people.

The minority Protestant population in the Republic was outraged by cuts announced by the Minister for Education to grants previously available to the 21 Protestant denomination secondary schools. This breached a forty-year-old agreement that had been made when free secondary education was introduced by the then Minister for Education Donogh O'Malley. It was claimed that the cuts would disproportionately affect Protestant schools. Protestant parents claimed that they would have to accept fewer teachers per child, and that their schools would not be funded to employ non-academic staff in the way that their Roman Catholic neighbours are.

== Proposed re-introduction of third-level fees ==
On 11 August 2008, O'Keeffe proposed the re-introduction of third-level fees which had been abolished in Ireland since 1995. While originally indicating that high earners would be hit, it was later announced that this scheme would raise far short of the €500 million in the original report compiled by UCC economist, Dr. Noel Woods. O'Keeffe stated that he wanted to increase third-level participation, and claimed that the "free fees" scheme had not accomplished this. After putting forward a range of options to the cabinet in July 2009, O'Keeffe set a deadline of 15 September 2009 for his colleagues to decide on the issue. The range of options was then discussed in a new programme for government. It was later announced in the new programme for government, brokered by both Fianna Fáil and the Green Party, that third-level fees would not be introduced in the lifetime of the government, although O'Keeffe had stated his support for their introduction and had stated that existing registration fees, commonly described as "fees by another name", faced an increase. His stance on fees was supported by former education ministers Noel Dempsey and Mary Hanafin.

== Resignation and retirement ==
O'Keeffe resigned his position as Minister for Enterprise, Trade and Innovation on 20 January 2011. He retired from politics at the 2011 general election.

Political offices
Preceded by Noel Ahern; Pat "the Cope" Gallagher	Minister of State at the Department of the Environment, Heritage and Local Government; 2004–2008; With: Noel Ahern (2004–2007); Tony Killeen (2007–2008); Máire Hoctor (2007–2008)	Succeeded by Michael Finneran; Máire Hoctor; Michael Kitt
Preceded by Mary Hanafin	Minister for Education and Science; 2008–2010	Succeeded by Mary Coughlan as Minister for Education and Skills
Preceded by Mary Coughlan as Minister for Enterprise, Trade and Employment	Minister for Enterprise, Trade and Innovation; 2010–2011	Succeeded by Mary Hanafin

Dáil	Election	Deputy (Party)	Deputy (Party)	Deputy (Party)	Deputy (Party)	Deputy (Party)
22nd	1981	Eileen Desmond (Lab)	Gene Fitzgerald (FF)	Pearse Wyse (FF)	Hugh Coveney (FG)	Peter Barry (FG)
23rd	1982 (Feb)	Eileen Desmond (Lab)	Gene Fitzgerald (FF)	Pearse Wyse (FF)	Jim Corr (FG)	Peter Barry (FG)
24th	1982 (Nov)	Eileen Desmond (Lab)	Gene Fitzgerald (FF)	Pearse Wyse (FF)	Hugh Coveney (FG)	Peter Barry (FG)
25th	1987	Toddy O'Sullivan (Lab)	John Dennehy (FF)	Batt O'Keeffe (FF)	Pearse Wyse (PDs)	Peter Barry (FG)
26th	1989	Toddy O'Sullivan (Lab)	John Dennehy (FF)	Micheál Martin (FF)	Pearse Wyse (PDs)	Peter Barry (FG)
27th	1992	Toddy O'Sullivan (Lab)	Batt O'Keeffe (FF)	Micheál Martin (FF)	Pat Cox (PDs)	Peter Barry (FG)
27th	1994 by-election	Toddy O'Sullivan (Lab)	Batt O'Keeffe (FF)	Micheál Martin (FF)	Hugh Coveney (FG)	Peter Barry (FG)
28th	1997	John Dennehy (FF)	Batt O'Keeffe (FF)	Micheál Martin (FF)	Hugh Coveney (FG)	Deirdre Clune (FG)
28th	1998 by-election	John Dennehy (FF)	Batt O'Keeffe (FF)	Micheál Martin (FF)	Simon Coveney (FG)	Deirdre Clune (FG)
29th	2002	John Dennehy (FF)	Batt O'Keeffe (FF)	Micheál Martin (FF)	Simon Coveney (FG)	Dan Boyle (GP)
30th	2007	Ciarán Lynch (Lab)	Michael McGrath (FF)	Micheál Martin (FF)	Simon Coveney (FG)	Deirdre Clune (FG)
31st	2011	Ciarán Lynch (Lab)	Michael McGrath (FF)	Micheál Martin (FF)	Simon Coveney (FG)	Jerry Buttimer (FG)
32nd	2016	Donnchadh Ó Laoghaire (SF)	Michael McGrath (FF)	Micheál Martin (FF)	Simon Coveney (FG)	4 seats 2016–2024
33rd	2020	Donnchadh Ó Laoghaire (SF)	Michael McGrath (FF)	Micheál Martin (FF)	Simon Coveney (FG)	4 seats 2016–2024
34th	2024	Donnchadh Ó Laoghaire (SF)	Séamus McGrath (FF)	Micheál Martin (FF)	Jerry Buttimer (FG)	Pádraig Rice (SD)

Dáil	Election	Deputy (Party)	Deputy (Party)	Deputy (Party)
22nd	1981	Thomas Meaney (FF)	Frank Crowley (FG)	Donal Creed (FG)
23rd	1982 (Feb)	Thomas Meaney (FF)	Frank Crowley (FG)	Donal Creed (FG)
24th	1982 (Nov)	Donal Moynihan (FF)	Frank Crowley (FG)	Donal Creed (FG)
25th	1987	Donal Moynihan (FF)	Frank Crowley (FG)	Donal Creed (FG)
26th	1989	Laurence Kelly (FF)	Frank Crowley (FG)	Michael Creed (FG)
27th	1992	Donal Moynihan (FF)	Frank Crowley (FG)	Michael Creed (FG)
28th	1997	Donal Moynihan (FF)	Michael Moynihan (FF)	Michael Creed (FG)
29th	2002	Donal Moynihan (FF)	Michael Moynihan (FF)	Gerard Murphy (FG)
30th	2007	Batt O'Keeffe (FF)	Michael Moynihan (FF)	Michael Creed (FG)
31st	2011	Áine Collins (FG)	Michael Moynihan (FF)	Michael Creed (FG)
32nd	2016	Aindrias Moynihan (FF)	Michael Moynihan (FF)	Michael Creed (FG)
33rd	2020	Aindrias Moynihan (FF)	Michael Moynihan (FF)	Michael Creed (FG)
34th	2024	Aindrias Moynihan (FF)	Michael Moynihan (FF)	John Paul O'Shea (FG)
