= Michael Moynihan (Cork politician) =

Irish politician (born 1968)

Michael Moynihan TD
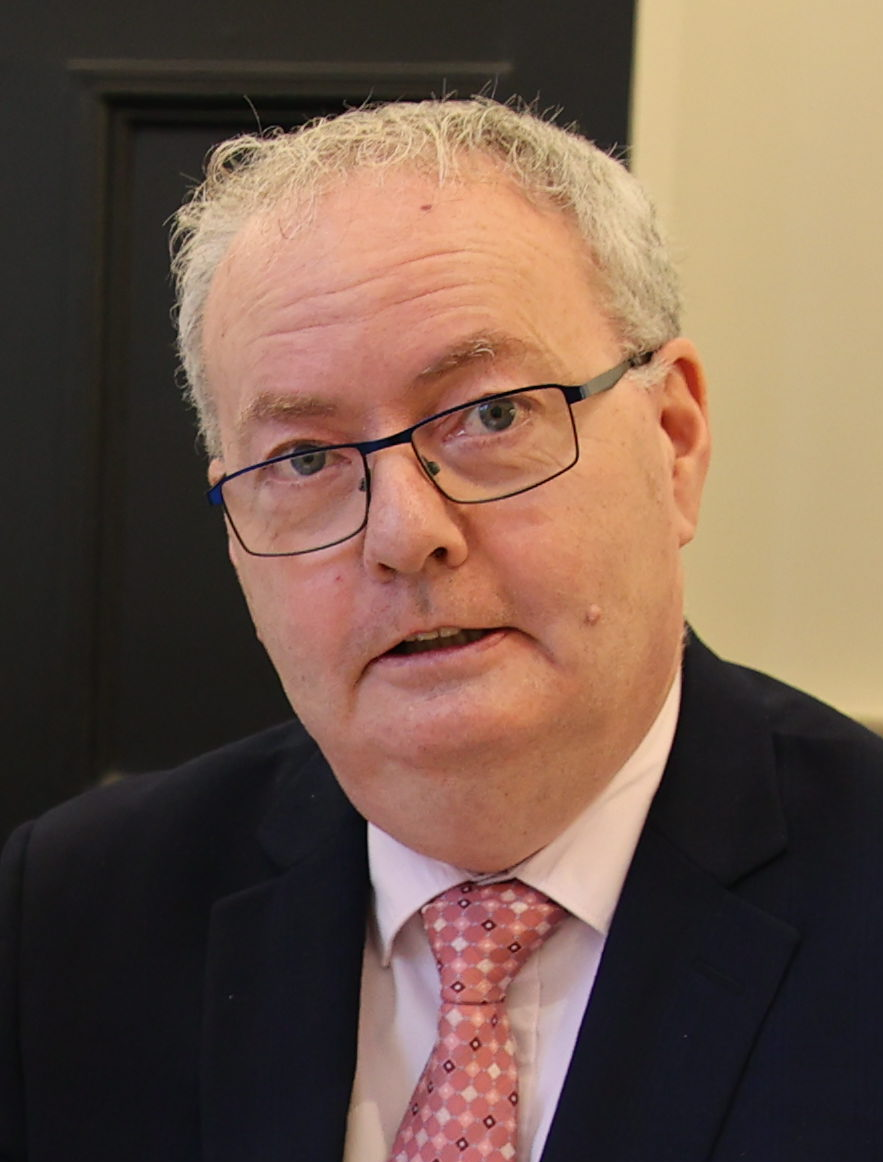
- Moynihan in 2024

Minister of State
- 2025–: Education and Youth

Teachta Dála
- Incumbent
- Assumed office June 1997
- Constituency: Cork North-West

Personal details
- Born: 12 January 1968 (age 58) Cork, Ireland
- Party: Fianna Fáil
- Spouse: Bríd O'Sullivan (m. 1999)
- Children: 2
- Education: Cork Institute of Technology

Michael Moynihan (born 12 January 1968) is an Irish Fianna Fáil politician who has served as Minister of State at the Department of Education and Youth since January 2025 and a Teachta Dála (TD) for the Cork North-West constituency since the 1997 general election.

== Personal life ==
Moynihan was born in Cork in 1968, but is a native of Kiskeam, County Cork. He was educated locally at Boherbue Comprehensive School. He is not related to his constituency and party colleagues Donal Moynihan and Aindrias Moynihan, who were father and son.

== Political career ==
A dairy farmer by profession, he first became involved in national politics in 1997, when he was elected at the 1997 general election to Dáil Éireann as a Fianna Fáil TD. Moynihan's election caused somewhat of a shock because he succeeded in unseating sitting Fine Gael TD Frank Crowley, in what had been one of Fine Gael's strongest constituencies, where they had held more seats than Fianna Fáil. At the 1997 general election, another candidate, Donal Howard, gained votes in the Kanturk, Banteer, and Kilcorney areas of the constituency; this reduced the share of votes obtained by Frank Crowley, and contributed to his loss of his seat.

Moynihan was chair of the Oireachtas Joint Committee on Education and Science from 2004 to 2007. He served as chair of Ógra Fianna Fáil, the youth wing of the party, until 2005. He topped the poll at the 2002 general election and was re-elected at the 2007, 2011, 2016 and 2020 general elections.

He has served as the Fianna Fáil spokesperson on Agriculture and Food from 2011 to 2012, spokesperson on Communications, Energy and Natural Resources from 2012 to 2016 and Opposition Chief Whip from 2016 to 2020.

At the 2024 general election, Moynihan was re-elected to the Dáil. On 29 January 2025, he was appointed as Minister of State at the Department of Education and Youth.

Political offices
Preceded by Hildegarde Naughton	Minister of State at the Department of Education and Youth; 2025–present	Incumbent

Dáil	Election	Deputy (Party)	Deputy (Party)	Deputy (Party)
22nd	1981	Thomas Meaney (FF)	Frank Crowley (FG)	Donal Creed (FG)
23rd	1982 (Feb)	Thomas Meaney (FF)	Frank Crowley (FG)	Donal Creed (FG)
24th	1982 (Nov)	Donal Moynihan (FF)	Frank Crowley (FG)	Donal Creed (FG)
25th	1987	Donal Moynihan (FF)	Frank Crowley (FG)	Donal Creed (FG)
26th	1989	Laurence Kelly (FF)	Frank Crowley (FG)	Michael Creed (FG)
27th	1992	Donal Moynihan (FF)	Frank Crowley (FG)	Michael Creed (FG)
28th	1997	Donal Moynihan (FF)	Michael Moynihan (FF)	Michael Creed (FG)
29th	2002	Donal Moynihan (FF)	Michael Moynihan (FF)	Gerard Murphy (FG)
30th	2007	Batt O'Keeffe (FF)	Michael Moynihan (FF)	Michael Creed (FG)
31st	2011	Áine Collins (FG)	Michael Moynihan (FF)	Michael Creed (FG)
32nd	2016	Aindrias Moynihan (FF)	Michael Moynihan (FF)	Michael Creed (FG)
33rd	2020	Aindrias Moynihan (FF)	Michael Moynihan (FF)	Michael Creed (FG)
34th	2024	Aindrias Moynihan (FF)	Michael Moynihan (FF)	John Paul O'Shea (FG)
