= Áine Collins =

Irish former politician (born 1969)

Teachta Dála
- In office February 2011 – February 2016
- Constituency: Cork North-West

Personal details
- Born: 9 September 1969 (age 56) Banteer, County Cork, Ireland
- Party: Fine Gael
- Spouse: Paul Cassidy (m. 2006)
- Children: 3
- Education: University of East London

Áine Collins (born 9 September 1969) is an Irish former Fine Gael politician who served as a Teachta Dála (TD) for the Cork North-West constituency from 2011 to 2016.

== Early life and business ventures ==
Born in Banteer, County Cork, Collins was raised on a farm in north County Cork. She credits this as her inspiration, saying: "I grew up on a small farm where my father used to grow cabbage and sell it. I think from an early age I was part of that practice where you were involved in producing something." She bought a small-town pub and became involved in the restaurant trade. Collins is a certified accountant. In 2019, EFM Ireland appointed Collins as Business Development Director. Collins now lives in the Millstreet area.

Collins gave birth to her first child when she was 20 years old. Her daughter, Ciara, was born in London to her and her father Dermot, Collins' then boyfriend. Collins worked in finance and studied at night and then became unexpectedly pregnant. Ciara was seven when her dad Dermot died aged 31.

Collins credits her father for her interest in politics, who was chairperson of the local branch of Fine Gael. Her intention when she left school was to get into car sales, so she embarked on a year-long course in automobile engineering at CIT.

== Political career ==
One of three Fine Gael candidates including Michael Creed and Derry Canty, she received 17.2% of first preference votes and was elected on the sixth count without reaching the quota at the 2011 general election. She was a member of the Public Accounts Committee.

In July 2013, Collins was involved in the "Lapgate" controversy, which gained worldwide notoriety. Collins became noted as the centre of the incident, after her party colleague Tom Barry hauled her onto his lap during a late night debate on the abortion legislation.

She lost her seat at the 2016 general election. In 2018, she ruled out contesting the then next general election. In 2019, she failed in a bid to be elected as a Cork County Councillor for the Macroom local electoral area. She was an unsuccessful candidate at the 2020 Seanad election.

Dáil	Election	Deputy (Party)	Deputy (Party)	Deputy (Party)
22nd	1981	Thomas Meaney (FF)	Frank Crowley (FG)	Donal Creed (FG)
23rd	1982 (Feb)	Thomas Meaney (FF)	Frank Crowley (FG)	Donal Creed (FG)
24th	1982 (Nov)	Donal Moynihan (FF)	Frank Crowley (FG)	Donal Creed (FG)
25th	1987	Donal Moynihan (FF)	Frank Crowley (FG)	Donal Creed (FG)
26th	1989	Laurence Kelly (FF)	Frank Crowley (FG)	Michael Creed (FG)
27th	1992	Donal Moynihan (FF)	Frank Crowley (FG)	Michael Creed (FG)
28th	1997	Donal Moynihan (FF)	Michael Moynihan (FF)	Michael Creed (FG)
29th	2002	Donal Moynihan (FF)	Michael Moynihan (FF)	Gerard Murphy (FG)
30th	2007	Batt O'Keeffe (FF)	Michael Moynihan (FF)	Michael Creed (FG)
31st	2011	Áine Collins (FG)	Michael Moynihan (FF)	Michael Creed (FG)
32nd	2016	Aindrias Moynihan (FF)	Michael Moynihan (FF)	Michael Creed (FG)
33rd	2020	Aindrias Moynihan (FF)	Michael Moynihan (FF)	Michael Creed (FG)
34th	2024	Aindrias Moynihan (FF)	Michael Moynihan (FF)	John Paul O'Shea (FG)
