= Cork North-West =

Dáil constituency (1981–present)

- Dáil constituency
- Location of Cork North-West within Ireland
- Interactive map of constituency boundaries since the 2024 general election
- Major settlements: Buttevant; Charleville; Doneraile; Kanturk; Millstreet; Macroom

Current constituency
- Created: 1981
- Seats: 3
- TDs: Aindrias Moynihan (FF); Michael Moynihan (FF); John Paul O'Shea (FG)
- Local government area: County Cork
- EP constituency: South

Cork North-West is a parliamentary constituency represented in Dáil Éireann, the lower house of the Irish parliament or Oireachtas. The constituency elects three deputies (Teachtaí Dála, commonly known as TDs) on the system of proportional representation by means of the single transferable vote (PR-STV).

== History and boundaries ==
The constituency was created by the Electoral (Amendment) Act 1980 and first used at the 1981 general election. It is a large rural three-seat constituency. Due to its size and landscape it is considered one of the most difficult constituencies to canvass in Ireland. The constituency encompasses the western part of Ireland's largest county of Cork. It runs from Charleville and Rockchapel in the north to Ballingeary, Crookstown and Crossbarry in the south, and also takes in parts of the Mallow and Fermoy electoral areas.

The Constituency Review Report 2023 of the Electoral Commission recommended that at the next general election, Cork North-West be altered with the transfer of territory from Cork East and Cork North-Central and the transfer of territory (in the Ballincollig area) to Cork North-Central.

For the 2024 general election, the Electoral (Amendment) Act 2023 defines the constituency as:

"In the county of Cork, the electoral divisions of:

Ballygroman, Ballymurphy, Bengour, Brinny, Kilbonane, Knockavilly, Moviddy, Murragh, Teadies, Templemartin, in the former Rural District of Bandon;
Dripsey, in the former Rural District of Cork;
and that part that is contained within the county of Cork of the electoral division of: Ovens, in the former Rural District of Cork;
Aultagh, Bealock, Béal Átha an Ghaorthaidh, Carrigboy, Castletown, Coolmountain, Garrown, Kinneigh, Manch, Teerelton, in the former Rural District of Dunmanway;
Allow, Ballyhoolahan, Banteer, Barleyhill, Barnacurra, Bawncross, Boherboy, Castlecor, Castlemagner, Clonfert East, Clonfert West, Clonmeen, Coolclogh, Dromina, Glenlara, Gortmore, Greenane, Kanturk, Kilbrin, Kilmeen, Knockatooan, Knocktemple, Meens, Milford, Nad, Newmarket, Newtown, Roskeen, Rosnalee, Rowls, Tincoora, Tullylease, Williamstown, in the former Rural District of Kanturk;
Aghinagh, Aglish, An Sliabh Riabhach, Béal Átha an Ghaorthaidh, Cannaway, Ceann Droma, Cill na Martra, Claonráth, Clondrohid, Clonmoyle, Doire Fhínín, Gort na Tiobratan, Gowlane, Greenville, Inchigeelagh, Kilberrihert, Kilcullen, Macloneigh, Magourney, Mashanaglass, Mountrivers, Na hUláin, Rahalisk, Warrenscourt, in the former Rural District of Macroom;
Ardskeagh, Ballyclogh, Buttevant, Caherduggan, Churchtown, Doneraile, Dromore, Imphrick, Kilmaclenine, Kilshannig, Liscarroll, Milltown, Rathluirc, Springfort, Streamhill, Templemary, in the former Rural District of Mallow;
Caherbarnagh, Coomlogane, Crinnaloo, Cullen, Derragh, Doonasleen, Drishane, Keale, Kilcorney, Knocknagree, Rathcool, Skagh, in the former Rural District of Millstreet;
and Macroom Urban;

and in the City of Cork, that part that is contained within the City of Cork of the electoral division of: Ovens."

Changes to the Cork North-West constituency
| Years | TDs | Boundaries | Notes |
|---|---|---|---|
| 1981–1992 | 3 | The county of Cork, except the parts in the constituencies of Cork East, Cork North-Central, Cork South-Central and Cork South-West. | |
| 1992–1997 | 3 | The county of Cork, except the parts in the constituencies of Cork East, Cork North-Central, Cork South-Central and Cork South-West. | DEDs of Dripsey, Firmount and Matehy transferred from Cork North-Central. |
| 1997–2002 | 3 | The county of Cork, except the parts in the constituencies of Cork East, Cork North-Central, Cork South-Central and Cork South-West. | DEDs of Ahil and Douce transferred to Cork South-West. |
| 2002–2007 | 3 | The county of Cork, except the parts in the constituencies of Cork East, Cork North-Central, Cork South-Central and Cork South-West. | ED of Carrigrohane Beg transferred from Cork North-Central and the electoral division of Ovens transferred from Cork South-Central |
| 2007–2011 | 3 | In the county of Cork the electoral divisions of: Ballygroman, Ballymurphy, Bengour, Brinny, Kilbonane, Knockavilly, Moviddy, Murragh, Teadies, Templemartin, in the former Rural District of Bandon; Ballincollig, Ovens, in the former Rural District of Cork; Aultagh, Bealock, Béal Átha an Ghaorthaidh, Carrigboy, Castletown, Coolmountain, Garrown, Kinneigh, Manch, Teerelton, in the former Rural District of Dunmanway; Allow, Ballyhoolahan, Banteer, Barleyhill, Barnacurra, Bawncross, Boherboy, Castlecor, Castlemagner, Clonfert East, Clonfert West, Clonmeen, Coolclogh, Dromina, Glenlara, Gortmore, Greenane, Kanturk, Kilbrin, Kilmeen, Knockatooan, Knocktemple, Meens, Milford, Nad, Newmarket, Newtown, Roskeen, Rosnalee, Rowls, Tincoora, Tullylease, Williamstown, in the former Rural District of Kanturk; Aghinagh, An Sliabh Riabhach, Aglish, Béal Átha an Ghaorthaidh, Cannaway, Ceann Droma, Cill na Martra, Claonráth, Clondrohid, Clonmoyle, Doire Fhínín, Gort na Tiobratan, Greenville, Inchigeelagh, Kilberrihert, Kilcullen, Macloneigh, Magourney, Mashanaglass, Mountrivers, Na hUláin, Rahalisk, Warrenscourt, in the former Rural District of Macroom; Ardskeagh, Churchtown, Dromore, Imphrick, Kilshannig, Liscarroll, Milltown, Rathluirc, Springfort, Streamhill, Templemary, in the former Rural District of Mallow; Caherbarnagh, Coomlogane, Crinnaloo, Cullen, Derragh, Doonasleen, Drishane, Keale, Kilcorney, Knocknagree, Rathcool, Skagh, in the former Rural District of Millstreet; and the town of Macroom. | ED of Ballincollig transferred from Cork South-Central. |
| 2011–2016 | 3 | In the county of Cork the electoral divisions of: Ballygroman, Ballymurphy, Bengour, Brinny, Kilbonane, Knockavilly, Moviddy, Murragh, Teadies, Templemartin, in the former Rural District of Bandon; Ballincollig, Ovens, in the former Rural District of Cork; Aultagh, Bealock, Béal Átha an Ghaorthaidh, Carrigboy, Castletown, Coolmountain, Garrown, Kinneigh, Manch, Teerelton, in the former Rural District of Dunmanway; Allow, Ballyhoolahan, Banteer, Barleyhill, Barnacurra, Bawncross, Boherboy, Castlecor, Castlemagner, Clonfert East, Clonfert West, Clonmeen, Coolclogh, Dromina, Glenlara, Gortmore, Greenane, Kanturk, Kilbrin, Kilmeen, Knockatooan, Knocktemple, Meens, Milford, Nad, Newmarket, Newtown, Roskeen, Rosnalee, Rowls, Tincoora, Tullylease, Williamstown, in the former Rural District of Kanturk; Aghinagh, An Sliabh Riabhach, Aglish, Béal Átha an Ghaorthaidh, Cannaway, Ceann Droma, Cill na Martra, Claonráth, Clondrohid, Clonmoyle, Doire Fhínín, Gort na Tiobratan, Greenville, Inchigeelagh, Kilberrihert, Macloneigh, Magourney, Mashanaglass, Na hUláin, Rahalisk, Warrenscourt, in the former Rural District of Macroom; Ardskeagh, Churchtown, Imphrick, Liscarroll, Milltown, Rathluirc, Springfort, Streamhill, Templemary, in the former Rural District of Mallow; Caherbarnagh, Coomlogane, Crinnaloo, Cullen, Derragh, Doonasleen, Drishane, Keale, Kilcorney, Knocknagree, Rathcool, Skagh; and the town of Macroom. | EDs of Kilcullen, Mountrivers, Dromore and Kilshannig transferred to Cork North-Central. |
| 2016– | 3 | In the county of Cork the electoral divisions of: Ballygroman, Ballymurphy, Bengour, Brinny, Kilbonane, Knockavilly, Moviddy, Murragh, Teadies, Templemartin, in the former Rural District of Bandon; Ballincollig, Ovens, in the former Rural District of Cork; Aultagh, Bealock, Béal Átha an Ghaorthaidh, Carrigboy, Castletown, Coolmountain, Garrown, Kinneigh, Manch, Teerelton, in the former Rural District of Dunmanway; Allow, Ballyhoolahan, Banteer, Barleyhill, Barnacurra, Bawncross, Boherboy, Castlecor, Castlemagner, Clonfert East, Clonfert West, Clonmeen, Coolclogh, Dromina, Glenlara, Gortmore, Greenane, Kanturk, Kilbrin, Kilmeen, Knockatooan, Knocktemple, Meens, Milford, Nad, Newmarket, Newtown, Roskeen, Rosnalee, Rowls, Tincoora, Tullylease, Williamstown, in the former Rural District of Kanturk; Aghinagh, An Sliabh Riabhach, Aglish, Béal Átha an Ghaorthaidh, Cannaway, Ceann Droma, Cill na Martra, Claonráth, Clondrohid, Clonmoyle, Doire Fhínín, Gort na Tiobratan, Greenville, Inchigeelagh, Kilberrihert, Kilcullen, Macloneigh, Magourney, Mashanaglass, Mountrivers, Na hUláin, Rahalisk, Warrenscourt, in the former Rural District of Macroom; Ardskeagh, Churchtown, Dromore, Imphrick, Kilshannig, Liscarroll, Milltown, Rathluirc, Springfort, Streamhill, Templemary, in the former Rural District of Mallow; Caherbarnagh, Coomlogane, Crinnaloo, Cullen, Derragh, Doonasleen, Drishane, Keale, Kilcorney, Knocknagree, Rathcool, Skagh, in the former Rural District of Millstreet; and Macroom Urban. | EDs of Kilcullen, Mountrivers, Dromore and Kilshannig transferred from Cork North-Central. |

== TDs ==
Teachtaí Dála (TDs) for Cork North-West 1981–
Key to parties: FF = Fianna Fáil; FG = Fine Gael
| Dáil | Election | Deputy (Party) | Deputy (Party) | Deputy (Party) |
| 22nd | 1981 | Thomas Meaney (FF) | Frank Crowley (FG) | Donal Creed (FG) |
| 23rd | 1982 (Feb) | Thomas Meaney (FF) | Frank Crowley (FG) | Donal Creed (FG) |
| 24th | 1982 (Nov) | Donal Moynihan (FF) | Frank Crowley (FG) | Donal Creed (FG) |
| 25th | 1987 | Donal Moynihan (FF) | Frank Crowley (FG) | Donal Creed (FG) |
| 26th | 1989 | Laurence Kelly (FF) | Frank Crowley (FG) | Michael Creed (FG) |
| 27th | 1992 | Donal Moynihan (FF) | Frank Crowley (FG) | Michael Creed (FG) |
| 28th | 1997 | Donal Moynihan (FF) | Michael Moynihan (FF) | Michael Creed (FG) |
| 29th | 2002 | Donal Moynihan (FF) | Michael Moynihan (FF) | Gerard Murphy (FG) |
| 30th | 2007 | Batt O'Keeffe (FF) | Michael Moynihan (FF) | Michael Creed (FG) |
| 31st | 2011 | Áine Collins (FG) | Michael Moynihan (FF) | Michael Creed (FG) |
| 32nd | 2016 | Aindrias Moynihan (FF) | Michael Moynihan (FF) | Michael Creed (FG) |
| 33rd | 2020 | Aindrias Moynihan (FF) | Michael Moynihan (FF) | Michael Creed (FG) |
| 34th | 2024 | Aindrias Moynihan (FF) | Michael Moynihan (FF) | John Paul O'Shea (FG) |

Note: The columns in this table are used only for presentational purposes, and no significance should be attached to the order of columns. For details of the order in which seats were won at each election, see the detailed results of that election.

== Elections ==
*: Outgoing TD

=== 2024 general election ===
2024 general election: Cork North-West
| Party | Candidate | FPv% | Count | | | | | |
| Party | Candidate | FPv% | 1 | 2 | 3 | 4 | 5 | 6 |
|---|---|---|---|---|---|---|---|---|
| Fianna Fáil | Aindrias Moynihan | 18.8 | 8,047 | 8,070 | 8,115 | 8,478 | 9,020 | 10,094 |
| Fianna Fáil | Michael Moynihan | 17.9 | 7,678 | 7,728 | 7,744 | 7,847 | 8,321 | 9,057 |
| Fine Gael | John Paul O'Shea | 17.7 | 7,603 | 7,678 | 7,714 | 7,918 | 8,451 | 9,351 |
| Fine Gael | Michael Creed | 17.1 | 7,321 | 7,341 | 7,365 | 7,696 | 8,020 | 8,692 |
| Sinn Féin | Nicole Ryan | 12.7 | 5,452 | 5,518 | 5,896 | 6,383 | 7,530 | |
| Aontú | Becky Kealy | 7.8 | 3,364 | 3,459 | 3,536 | 4,054 | | |
| Green | Colette Finn | 2.5 | 1,052 | 1,069 | 1,241 | | | |
| Independent Ireland | Ellen Barry | 2.2 | 949 | 1,072 | 1,139 | | | |
| PBP–Solidarity | Joe Moore (Note: Moore is a member of People Before Profit.) | 2.0 | 838 | 876 | | | | |
| Independent | Walter Ryan-Purcell | 1.0 | 430 | | | | | |
| Independent | John O'Leary | 0.3 | 110 | | | | | |
Electorate: 67,255 Valid: 42,844 Spoilt: 266 Quota: 10,712 Turnout: 64.1%

=== 2020 general election ===
2020 general election: Cork North-West
| Party | Candidate | FPv% | Count | | | | |
| Party | Candidate | FPv% | 1 | 2 | 3 | 4 | 5 |
|---|---|---|---|---|---|---|---|
| Fianna Fáil | Aindrias Moynihan | 20.8 | 9,628 | 9,700 | 10,019 | 10,679 | 11,173 |
| Fianna Fáil | Michael Moynihan | 18.7 | 8,651 | 8,698 | 8,817 | 9,269 | 11,240 |
| Fine Gael | Michael Creed | 18.0 | 8,338 | 8,376 | 8,772 | 9,099 | 13,060 |
| Fine Gael | John Paul O'Shea | 15.2 | 7,065 | 7,120 | 7,352 | 7,816 | |
| Aontú | Becky Kealy | 8.4 | 3,877 | 4,354 | 5,066 | | |
| Social Democrats | Ciarán McCarthy | 8.3 | 3,845 | 4,241 | 5,918 | 8,079 | 8,588 |
| Green | Colette Finn | 7.5 | 3,495 | 3,694 | | | |
| Irish Freedom | Tara Nic Domhnaill | 2.1 | 956 | | | | |
| Independent | Seán O'Leary | 1.1 | 515 | | | | |
Electorate: 71,685 Valid: 46,370 Spoilt: 486 Quota: 11,593 Turnout: 46,856 (65.4%)

=== 2016 general election ===
2016 general election: Cork North-West
| Party | Candidate | FPv% | Count | | | | | | | | |
| Party | Candidate | FPv% | 1 | 2 | 3 | 4 | 5 | 6 | 7 | 8 | 9 |
|---|---|---|---|---|---|---|---|---|---|---|---|
| Fianna Fáil | Aindrias Moynihan | 18.8 | 8,924 | 9,004 | 9,201 | 9,367 | 9,678 | 9,956 | 10,755 | 11,141 | 11,959 |
| Fine Gael | Michael Creed | 18.7 | 8,869 | 9,024 | 9,174 | 9,327 | 9,566 | 9,747 | 10,078 | 14,957 | |
| Fianna Fáil | Michael Moynihan | 15.5 | 7,332 | 7,344 | 7,374 | 7,519 | 7,758 | 8,144 | 8,388 | 9,228 | 9,929 |
| Fine Gael | Áine Collins | 13.2 | 6,237 | 6,297 | 6,495 | 6,685 | 6,944 | 7,191 | 7,388 | | |
| Independent | John Paul O'Shea | 10.2 | 4,814 | 4,919 | 5,033 | 5,444 | 5,723 | 6,687 | 7,897 | 8,549 | 9,680 |
| Sinn Féin | Nigel Dennehy | 6.8 | 3,238 | 3,334 | 3,485 | 3,633 | 3,783 | 4,256 | | | |
| Independent | Diarmuid O'Flynn | 4.6 | 2,159 | 2,317 | 2,499 | 2,727 | 2,930 | | | | |
| Renua | Jason Fitzgerald | 3.3 | 1,568 | 1,633 | 1,760 | 1,880 | | | | | |
| Independent | Steven O'Riordan | 2.9 | 1,361 | 1,530 | 1,728 | | | | | | |
| Green | Cormac Manning | 2.8 | 1,354 | 1,501 | | | | | | | |
| Independent | Jerry O'Sullivan | 1.0 | 478 | | | | | | | | |
| Independent | Shirley Griffin | 0.9 | 439 | | | | | | | | |
| Communist | Michael O'Donnell | 0.3 | 185 | | | | | | | | |
Electorate: 67,589 Valid: 46,958 Spoilt: 395 Quota: 11,740 Turnout: 47,353 (70.1%)

=== 2011 general election ===
2011 general election: Cork North-West
| Party | Candidate | FPv% | Count | | | | | |
| Party | Candidate | FPv% | 1 | 2 | 3 | 4 | 5 | 6 |
|---|---|---|---|---|---|---|---|---|
| Fine Gael | Michael Creed | 22.1 | 10,112 | 10,264 | 10,426 | 10,797 | 12,415 | |
| Fianna Fáil | Michael Moynihan | 19.3 | 8,845 | 9,009 | 10,699 | 11,108 | 11,362 | 11,423 |
| Fine Gael | Áine Collins | 17.2 | 7,884 | 8,223 | 8,345 | 8,738 | 10,534 | 11,242 |
| Labour | Martin Coughlan | 14.0 | 6,421 | 7,066 | 7,255 | 8,952 | 9,918 | 10,128 |
| Fine Gael | Derry Canty | 9.5 | 4,325 | 4,470 | 4,704 | 5,092 | | |
| Sinn Féin | Des O'Grady | 7.4 | 3,405 | 3,916 | 4,052 | | | |
| Fianna Fáil | Daithí Ó Donnabháin | 5.6 | 2,545 | 2,633 | | | | |
| People Before Profit | Anne Foley (Note: Foley campaigned as a member of the United Left Alliance.) | 3.4 | 1,552 | | | | | |
| Green | Mark Collins | 1.4 | 651 | | | | | |
Electorate: 62,129 Valid: 45,740 Spoilt: 454 (1.0%) Quota: 11,436 Turnout: 46,194 (74.4%)

=== 2007 general election ===
2007 general election: Cork North-West
| Party | Candidate | FPv% | Count | | | | |
| Party | Candidate | FPv% | 1 | 2 | 3 | 4 | 5 |
|---|---|---|---|---|---|---|---|
| Fine Gael | Michael Creed | 22.6 | 10,516 | 10,878 | 12,420 | | |
| Fianna Fáil | Michael Moynihan | 21.7 | 10,146 | 10,243 | 10,384 | 14,001 | |
| Fianna Fáil | Batt O'Keeffe | 17.3 | 8,040 | 8,213 | 8,498 | 10,668 | 12,665 |
| Fine Gael | Gerard Murphy | 15.8 | 7,397 | 7,545 | 7,970 | 8,309 | 8,657 |
| Fianna Fáil | Donal Moynihan | 14.1 | 6,546 | 6,638 | 6,919 | | |
| Labour | Martin Coughlan | 4.9 | 2,288 | 2,980 | | | |
| Green | Caroline Robinson | 3.6 | 1,687 | | | | |
Electorate: 64,085 Valid: 46,620 Spoilt: 401 (0.8%) Quota: 11,656 Turnout: 47,021 (73.3%)

=== 2002 general election ===
2002 general election: Cork North-West
| Party | Candidate | FPv% | Count | | | |
| Party | Candidate | FPv% | 1 | 2 | 3 | 4 |
|---|---|---|---|---|---|---|
| Fianna Fáil | Michael Moynihan | 27.2 | 10,540 | | | |
| Fianna Fáil | Donal Moynihan | 22.9 | 8,893 | 9,485 | 10,154 | |
| Fine Gael | Gerard Murphy | 22.0 | 8,548 | 8,729 | 9,417 | 9,507 |
| Fine Gael | Michael Creed | 20.1 | 7,787 | 7,817 | 9,157 | 9,460 |
| Labour | Martin Coughlan | 6.8 | 2,668 | 2,694 | | |
| Christian Solidarity | Gerry Duffy | 1.0 | 383 | 389 | | |
Electorate: 53,699 Valid: 38,819 Spoilt: 574 (1.5%) Quota: 9,705 Turnout: 39,393 (73.3%)

=== 1997 general election ===
1997 general election: Cork North-West
| Party | Candidate | FPv% | Count | | |
| Party | Candidate | FPv% | 1 | 2 | 3 |
|---|---|---|---|---|---|
| Fianna Fáil | Michael Moynihan | 23.9 | 8,299 | 9,249 | |
| Fine Gael | Michael Creed | 23.1 | 8,041 | 9,367 | |
| Fianna Fáil | Donal Moynihan | 22.6 | 7,867 | 8,433 | 8,541 |
| Fine Gael | Frank Crowley | 18.0 | 6,253 | 7,345 | 7,913 |
| Labour | Bill Cashin | 7.4 | 2,574 | | |
| Independent | Donie Howard | 5.0 | 1,729 | | |
Electorate: 47,119 Valid: 34,763 Spoilt: 401 (1.1%) Quota: 8,691 Turnout: 35,164 (74.6%)

=== 1992 general election ===
1992 general election: Cork North-West
| Party | Candidate | FPv% | Count | | | |
| Party | Candidate | FPv% | 1 | 2 | 3 | 4 |
|---|---|---|---|---|---|---|
| Fine Gael | Michael Creed | 24.1 | 8,034 | 8,061 | 8,330 | 10,041 |
| Fine Gael | Frank Crowley | 19.9 | 6,642 | 6,655 | 6,867 | 8,263 |
| Fianna Fáil | Donal Moynihan | 19.1 | 6,375 | 6,390 | 7,880 | 8,425 |
| Labour | Bill Cashin | 14.2 | 4,729 | 4,786 | 4,990 | |
| Fianna Fáil | Laurence Kelly | 12.6 | 4,201 | 4,222 | 5,134 | 5,724 |
| Fianna Fáil | Daniel Fleming | 9.5 | 3,176 | 3,194 | | |
| Independent | Barbara Hyland | 0.5 | 180 | | | |
Electorate: 44,848 Valid: 33,337 Spoilt: 566 (1.7%) Quota: 8,335 Turnout: 33,903 (75.6%)

=== 1989 general election ===
1989 general election: Cork North-West
| Party | Candidate | FPv% | Count | | | |
| Party | Candidate | FPv% | 1 | 2 | 3 | 4 |
|---|---|---|---|---|---|---|
| Fine Gael | Michael Creed | 27.9 | 9,059 | | | |
| Fine Gael | Frank Crowley | 26.6 | 8,632 | | | |
| Fianna Fáil | Laurence Kelly | 23.2 | 7,523 | 7,710 | 7,994 | 8,095 |
| Fianna Fáil | Donal Moynihan | 21.4 | 6,953 | 7,552 | 7,703 | 7,789 |
| Independent | William Fitzsimon | 0.8 | 260 | 426 | 516 | |
Electorate: 41,098 Valid: 32,427 Quota: 8,107 Turnout: 78.9%

=== 1987 general election ===
1987 general election: Cork North-West
| Party | Candidate | FPv% | Count | | |
| Party | Candidate | FPv% | 1 | 2 | 3 |
|---|---|---|---|---|---|
| Fianna Fáil | Donal Moynihan | 23.3 | 7,777 | 8,343 | 8,355 |
| Fine Gael | Frank Crowley | 22.3 | 7,431 | 8,518 | |
| Fianna Fáil | Jack Roche | 22.0 | 7,343 | 7,907 | 7,931 |
| Fine Gael | Donal Creed | 21.1 | 7,057 | 8,349 | 8,479 |
| Progressive Democrats | Seán O'Riordan | 11.4 | 3,796 | | |
Electorate: 41,441 Valid: 33,404 Quota: 8,352 Turnout: 80.6%

=== November 1982 general election ===
November 1982 general election: Cork North-West
| Party | Candidate | FPv% | Count | | | |
| Party | Candidate | FPv% | 1 | 2 | 3 | 4 |
|---|---|---|---|---|---|---|
| Fine Gael | Donal Creed | 26.7 | 8,882 | | | |
| Fine Gael | Frank Crowley | 22.2 | 7,381 | 7,876 | 9,172 | |
| Fianna Fáil | Jack Roche | 18.9 | 6,272 | 6,277 | 6,483 | 6,483 |
| Fianna Fáil | Donal Moynihan | 16.3 | 5,417 | 5,444 | 5,758 | 8,324 |
| Fianna Fáil | James Long | 9.3 | 3,086 | 3,101 | 3,286 | |
| Labour | Martin McCarthy | 6.6 | 2,199 | | | |
Electorate: 40,562 Valid: 33,237 Quota: 8,310 Turnout: 81.9%

=== February 1982 general election ===
February 1982 general election: Cork North-West
| Party | Candidate | FPv% | Count | | | |
| Party | Candidate | FPv% | 1 | 2 | 3 | 4 |
|---|---|---|---|---|---|---|
| Fine Gael | Donal Creed | 21.8 | 7,305 | 8,038 | 8,115 | 8,142 |
| Fine Gael | Frank Crowley | 21.6 | 7,240 | 8,342 | 8,754 | |
| Fianna Fáil | Thomas Meaney | 20.9 | 7,025 | 7,433 | 10,037 | |
| Fianna Fáil | Donal Moynihan | 15.3 | 5,137 | 5,356 | 6,095 | 7,731 |
| Fianna Fáil | Michael Donegan | 11.1 | 3,726 | 3,953 | | |
| Labour | Michael Smith | 9.2 | 3,061 | | | |
Electorate: 40,156 Valid: 33,494 Spoilt: 237 (0.7%) Quota: 8,374 Turnout: 33,731 (83.9%)

=== 1981 general election ===
1981 general election: Cork North-West
| Party | Candidate | FPv% | Count | | | |
| Party | Candidate | FPv% | 1 | 2 | 3 | 4 |
|---|---|---|---|---|---|---|
| Fianna Fáil | Thomas Meaney | 28.7 | 9,756 | | | |
| Fine Gael | Donal Creed | 23.9 | 8,104 | 9,335 | | |
| Fine Gael | Frank Crowley | 18.2 | 6,174 | 7,971 | 8,113 | 8,869 |
| Fianna Fáil | Donal Moynihan | 17.3 | 5,865 | 6,510 | 7,637 | 7,729 |
| Labour | Michael Smith | 11.9 | 4,048 | | | |
Electorate: 40,156 Valid: 33,947 Quota: 8,487 Turnout: 84.5%

== See also ==
- Elections in the Republic of Ireland
- Politics of the Republic of Ireland
- List of Dáil by-elections
- List of political parties in the Republic of Ireland
