= Frank Crowley (politician) =

Irish politician (1939–2022)

Teachta Dála
- In office June 1981 – June 1997
- Constituency: Cork North-West

Personal details
- Born: 29 May 1939 Banteer, County Cork, Ireland
- Died: 16 August 2022 (aged 83) Cork, Ireland
- Party: Fine Gael
- Spouse: Winifrid McCarthy (m. 1967)
- Children: 2

Frank Crowley (29 May 1939 – 16 August 2022) was an Irish Fine Gael politician who served as a Teachta Dála (TD) for the Cork North-West constituency from 1981 to 1997.

Crowley first stood for election in the Cork Mid constituency at the 1977 general election. However, in the landslide victory for Fianna Fáil which saw Jack Lynch returned as Taoiseach with a 20-seat majority, Fianna Fáil took three of the five seats in Cork Mid, and Crowley was unsuccessful.

He stood again at the 1981 general election and was elected to the 22nd Dáil for the new constituency of Cork North-West. He was re-elected at five further general elections until he lost his seat at the 1997 general election.

In 1991, he topped the poll in elections to Cork County Council as a councillor for the Kanturk local electoral area; he was re-elected in 1999, but did not contest the 2004 local elections.

Conway died in Cork on 16 August 2022, at the age of 83.

Dáil	Election	Deputy (Party)	Deputy (Party)	Deputy (Party)
22nd	1981	Thomas Meaney (FF)	Frank Crowley (FG)	Donal Creed (FG)
23rd	1982 (Feb)	Thomas Meaney (FF)	Frank Crowley (FG)	Donal Creed (FG)
24th	1982 (Nov)	Donal Moynihan (FF)	Frank Crowley (FG)	Donal Creed (FG)
25th	1987	Donal Moynihan (FF)	Frank Crowley (FG)	Donal Creed (FG)
26th	1989	Laurence Kelly (FF)	Frank Crowley (FG)	Michael Creed (FG)
27th	1992	Donal Moynihan (FF)	Frank Crowley (FG)	Michael Creed (FG)
28th	1997	Donal Moynihan (FF)	Michael Moynihan (FF)	Michael Creed (FG)
29th	2002	Donal Moynihan (FF)	Michael Moynihan (FF)	Gerard Murphy (FG)
30th	2007	Batt O'Keeffe (FF)	Michael Moynihan (FF)	Michael Creed (FG)
31st	2011	Áine Collins (FG)	Michael Moynihan (FF)	Michael Creed (FG)
32nd	2016	Aindrias Moynihan (FF)	Michael Moynihan (FF)	Michael Creed (FG)
33rd	2020	Aindrias Moynihan (FF)	Michael Moynihan (FF)	Michael Creed (FG)
34th	2024	Aindrias Moynihan (FF)	Michael Moynihan (FF)	John Paul O'Shea (FG)
