= Michael Creed =

Irish politician (born 1963)

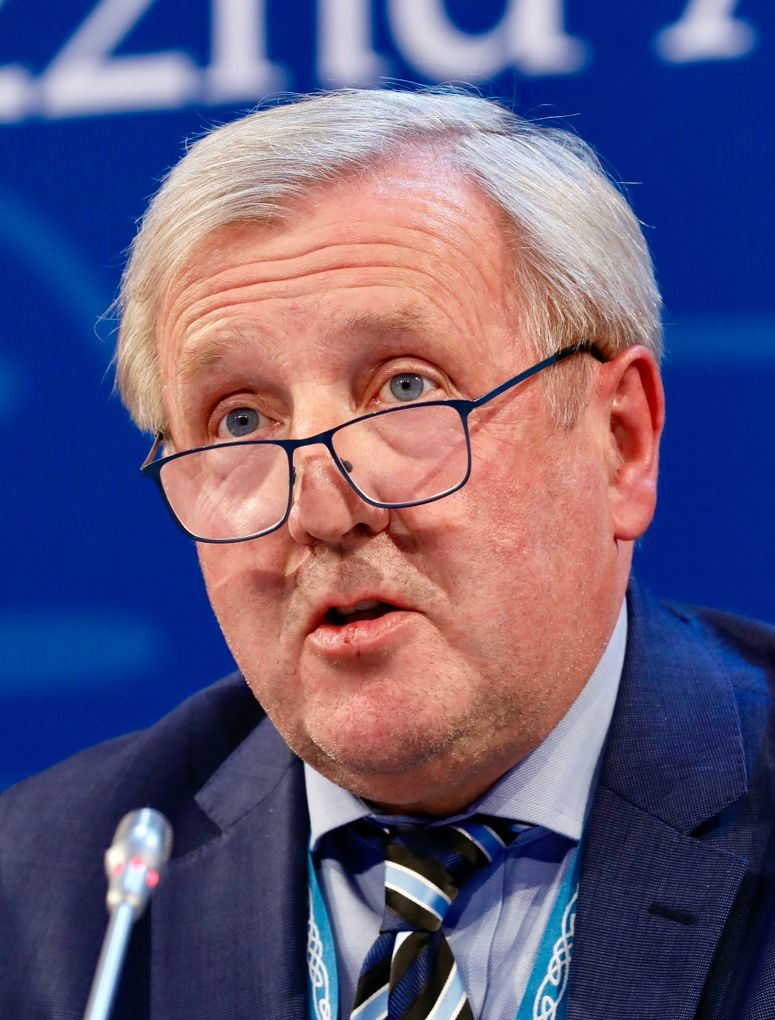
- Creed in 2024

Minister for Agriculture, Food and the Marine
- In office 6 May 2016 – 27 June 2020
- Taoiseach: Enda Kenny; Leo Varadkar
- Preceded by: Simon Coveney
- Succeeded by: Barry Cowen

Teachta Dála
- In office May 2007 – November 2024
- In office June 1989 – May 2002
- Constituency: Cork North-West

Personal details
- Born: 29 June 1963 (age 63) Macroom, County Cork, Ireland
- Party: Fine Gael
- Spouse: Sinéad Creed (m. 1999)
- Children: 3
- Parent: Donal Creed (father)
- Education: University College Cork; Dublin Institute of Technology
- Website: michaelcreed.ie

Michael Creed (born 29 June 1963) is an Irish former Fine Gael politician who served as a Teachta Dála (TD) for the Cork North-West constituency from 2007 to 2024, and previously from 1989 to 2002. He served as Minister for Agriculture, Food and the Marine from 2016 to 2020.

== Early and personal life ==
He is the son of the former TD and Minister of State, Donal Creed. Born in Macroom, County Cork, in 1963. Creed was educated at St. Colman's College, Fermoy and De La Salle College, in Macroom. He went on to third level at University College Cork and the College of Commerce, Rathmines. His qualifications are a Bachelor of Arts, Higher Diploma of Education and a Diploma in Legal Studies.

== Political career ==
Creed was elected Cork County Council in 1985 for the local electoral area of Bandon. He served on that authority until 2007. He was Chairman of Cork County Council from 2005 to 2006. He was first elected to Dáil Éireann at the 1989 general election and retained his seat at each election until losing it at the 2002 general election, to his Fine Gael running mate Gerard Murphy. He was Chairman of the Dáil Small Business and Services Committee from 1995 to 1997. He was party Spokesperson on Education, Arts, Culture and the Gaeltacht in 1994, Health 1989 to 1993, Youth and Sport 1993 to 1994. After regaining his Dáil seat at the 2007 general election, at the expense of Gerard Murphy, he was party Spokesperson on Agriculture, Fisheries and Food from 2007 to 2010. At the 2011 general election he held his seat after topping the poll in the first preference vote.

In June 2010, he supported Richard Bruton's leadership challenge to Enda Kenny. Following Kenny's victory in a motion of confidence, Creed was not re-appointed to the front bench.

After Fine Gael formed a coalition government with the Labour Party in March 2011, to the surprise of many Creed remained as a backbench TD. He remained as a backbencher during the entire duration of the 31st Dáil.

He was again elected to the Dáil at the 2016 general election. Following the formation of a Fine Gael minority government in May 2016, Creed was appointed to the cabinet as Minister for Agriculture, Food and the Marine. He was re-appointed when Leo Varadkar became Taoiseach in June 2017. He stayed in office until the formation of a coalition government in 2020 of Fianna Fáil, Fine Gael and the Green Party in June 2020, when he was not appointed to cabinet.

In April 2023, Creed announced that he would not contest the next general election.

Political offices
Preceded by Simon Coveney	Minister for Agriculture, Food and the Marine; 2016–2020	Succeeded by Barry Cowen

Dáil	Election	Deputy (Party)	Deputy (Party)	Deputy (Party)
22nd	1981	Thomas Meaney (FF)	Frank Crowley (FG)	Donal Creed (FG)
23rd	1982 (Feb)	Thomas Meaney (FF)	Frank Crowley (FG)	Donal Creed (FG)
24th	1982 (Nov)	Donal Moynihan (FF)	Frank Crowley (FG)	Donal Creed (FG)
25th	1987	Donal Moynihan (FF)	Frank Crowley (FG)	Donal Creed (FG)
26th	1989	Laurence Kelly (FF)	Frank Crowley (FG)	Michael Creed (FG)
27th	1992	Donal Moynihan (FF)	Frank Crowley (FG)	Michael Creed (FG)
28th	1997	Donal Moynihan (FF)	Michael Moynihan (FF)	Michael Creed (FG)
29th	2002	Donal Moynihan (FF)	Michael Moynihan (FF)	Gerard Murphy (FG)
30th	2007	Batt O'Keeffe (FF)	Michael Moynihan (FF)	Michael Creed (FG)
31st	2011	Áine Collins (FG)	Michael Moynihan (FF)	Michael Creed (FG)
32nd	2016	Aindrias Moynihan (FF)	Michael Moynihan (FF)	Michael Creed (FG)
33rd	2020	Aindrias Moynihan (FF)	Michael Moynihan (FF)	Michael Creed (FG)
34th	2024	Aindrias Moynihan (FF)	Michael Moynihan (FF)	John Paul O'Shea (FG)
