= Laurence Kelly (politician) =

Irish former politician (born 1946)

Teachta Dála
- In office June 1989 – November 1992
- Constituency: Cork North-West

Personal details
- Born: 1 December 1946 (age 79) County Cork, Ireland
- Party: Fianna Fáil

Laurence Kelly (born 1 December 1946) is an Irish former Fianna Fáil politician who served as a Teachta Dála (TD) for the Cork North-West constituency from 1989 to 1992.

He lost his seat at the 1992 general election.

Dáil	Election	Deputy (Party)	Deputy (Party)	Deputy (Party)
22nd	1981	Thomas Meaney (FF)	Frank Crowley (FG)	Donal Creed (FG)
23rd	1982 (Feb)	Thomas Meaney (FF)	Frank Crowley (FG)	Donal Creed (FG)
24th	1982 (Nov)	Donal Moynihan (FF)	Frank Crowley (FG)	Donal Creed (FG)
25th	1987	Donal Moynihan (FF)	Frank Crowley (FG)	Donal Creed (FG)
26th	1989	Laurence Kelly (FF)	Frank Crowley (FG)	Michael Creed (FG)
27th	1992	Donal Moynihan (FF)	Frank Crowley (FG)	Michael Creed (FG)
28th	1997	Donal Moynihan (FF)	Michael Moynihan (FF)	Michael Creed (FG)
29th	2002	Donal Moynihan (FF)	Michael Moynihan (FF)	Gerard Murphy (FG)
30th	2007	Batt O'Keeffe (FF)	Michael Moynihan (FF)	Michael Creed (FG)
31st	2011	Áine Collins (FG)	Michael Moynihan (FF)	Michael Creed (FG)
32nd	2016	Aindrias Moynihan (FF)	Michael Moynihan (FF)	Michael Creed (FG)
33rd	2020	Aindrias Moynihan (FF)	Michael Moynihan (FF)	Michael Creed (FG)
34th	2024	Aindrias Moynihan (FF)	Michael Moynihan (FF)	John Paul O'Shea (FG)
