= Aindrias Moynihan =

Irish politician (born 1973)

Aindrias Moynihan TD
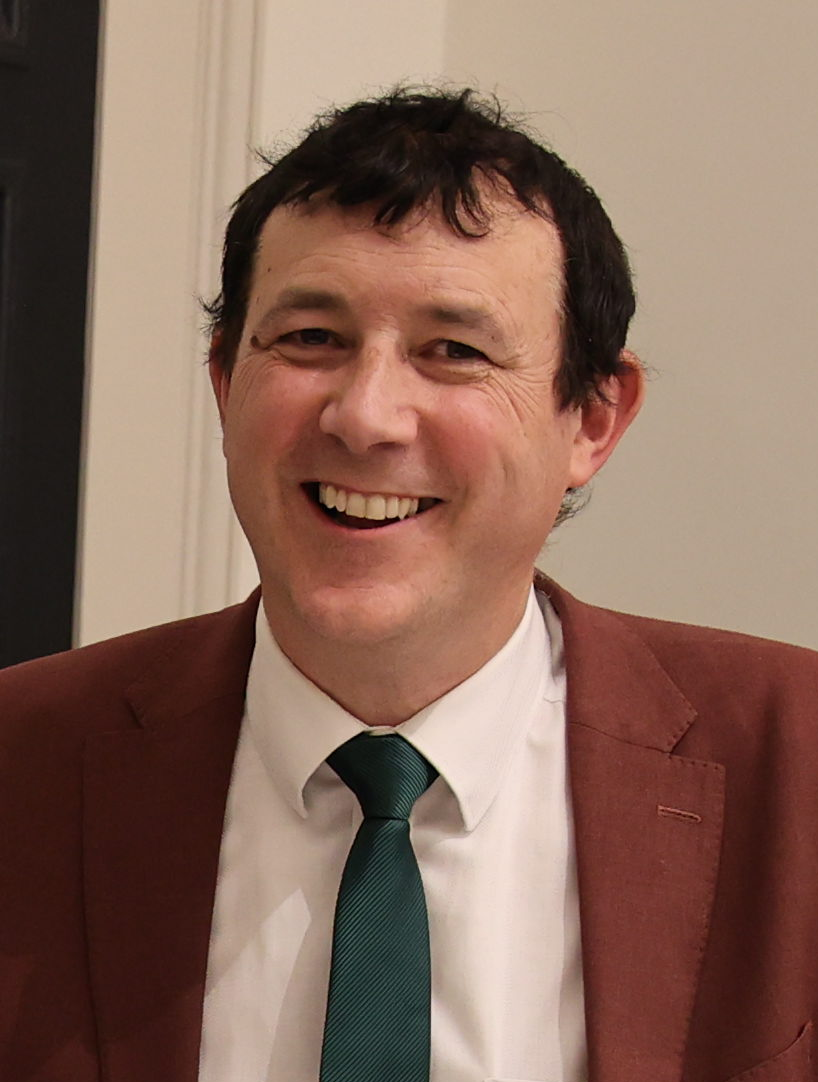
- Moynihan in 2024

Teachta Dála
- Incumbent
- Assumed office February 2016
- Constituency: Cork North-West

Personal details
- Born: 21 July 1973 (age 52) Macroom, County Cork, Ireland
- Party: Fianna Fáil
- Spouse: Lisa Moynihan
- Children: 4
- Parent: Donal Moynihan (father)
- Education: Cork Institute of Technology; University College Cork
- Website: aindriasmoynihan.ie

Aindrias Moynihan (born 21 July 1973) is an Irish Fianna Fáil politician who has been a Teachta Dála (TD) for the Cork North-West constituency since the 2016 general election.

== Cork County Council ==
He was a member of Cork County Council for the Blarney-Macroom local electoral area from 2003 to 2016.

== Dáil Éireann ==
Moynihan was elected been as a Teachta Dála (TD) for the Cork North-West constituency in the 2016 general election.

At the 2024 general election, Moynihan was re-elected to the Dáil. He was subsequently appointed Cathaoirleach of the Committee on Agriculture and Food.

He is the son of Donal Moynihan who was also a TD.

Dáil	Election	Deputy (Party)	Deputy (Party)	Deputy (Party)
22nd	1981	Thomas Meaney (FF)	Frank Crowley (FG)	Donal Creed (FG)
23rd	1982 (Feb)	Thomas Meaney (FF)	Frank Crowley (FG)	Donal Creed (FG)
24th	1982 (Nov)	Donal Moynihan (FF)	Frank Crowley (FG)	Donal Creed (FG)
25th	1987	Donal Moynihan (FF)	Frank Crowley (FG)	Donal Creed (FG)
26th	1989	Laurence Kelly (FF)	Frank Crowley (FG)	Michael Creed (FG)
27th	1992	Donal Moynihan (FF)	Frank Crowley (FG)	Michael Creed (FG)
28th	1997	Donal Moynihan (FF)	Michael Moynihan (FF)	Michael Creed (FG)
29th	2002	Donal Moynihan (FF)	Michael Moynihan (FF)	Gerard Murphy (FG)
30th	2007	Batt O'Keeffe (FF)	Michael Moynihan (FF)	Michael Creed (FG)
31st	2011	Áine Collins (FG)	Michael Moynihan (FF)	Michael Creed (FG)
32nd	2016	Aindrias Moynihan (FF)	Michael Moynihan (FF)	Michael Creed (FG)
33rd	2020	Aindrias Moynihan (FF)	Michael Moynihan (FF)	Michael Creed (FG)
34th	2024	Aindrias Moynihan (FF)	Michael Moynihan (FF)	John Paul O'Shea (FG)
