= Gerard Murphy (politician) =

Irish politician (1951–2024)

Cork County Councillor
- In office May 2009 – April 2024
- In office June 1991 – May 2002
- Constituency: Kanturk

Teachta Dála
- In office May 2002 – May 2007
- Constituency: Cork North-West

Personal details
- Born: 25 March 1951 Kanturk, County Cork, Ireland
- Died: 15 April 2024 (aged 73) Cork, Ireland
- Party: Fine Gael
- Spouse: Marian Murphy
- Children: 2

Gerard Murphy (25 March 1951 – 15 April 2024) was an Irish Fine Gael politician who served as a Teachta Dála (TD) for the Cork North-West constituency from 2002 to 2007. He also served as a member of Cork County Council from 1991 to 2002, and again from 2009 to 2024.

Murphy was elected to the 29th Dail at the 2002 general election, ousting his Fine Gael running-mate, three-term TD Michael Creed. He was Fine Gael's deputy spokesperson on Justice. He was previously a member of Cork County Council, to which he was elected in 1991. He lost his seat at the 2007 general election to his running-mate Michael Creed.

Following his defeat, he ran for election to Seanad Éireann but was defeated. He was re-elected to Cork County Council for the Kanturk local electoral area at the 2009 local elections. He was returned again to Cork County Council at the 2014 local elections and the 2019 local elections.

Murphy died on 15 April 2024, at the age of 73.

Dáil	Election	Deputy (Party)	Deputy (Party)	Deputy (Party)
22nd	1981	Thomas Meaney (FF)	Frank Crowley (FG)	Donal Creed (FG)
23rd	1982 (Feb)	Thomas Meaney (FF)	Frank Crowley (FG)	Donal Creed (FG)
24th	1982 (Nov)	Donal Moynihan (FF)	Frank Crowley (FG)	Donal Creed (FG)
25th	1987	Donal Moynihan (FF)	Frank Crowley (FG)	Donal Creed (FG)
26th	1989	Laurence Kelly (FF)	Frank Crowley (FG)	Michael Creed (FG)
27th	1992	Donal Moynihan (FF)	Frank Crowley (FG)	Michael Creed (FG)
28th	1997	Donal Moynihan (FF)	Michael Moynihan (FF)	Michael Creed (FG)
29th	2002	Donal Moynihan (FF)	Michael Moynihan (FF)	Gerard Murphy (FG)
30th	2007	Batt O'Keeffe (FF)	Michael Moynihan (FF)	Michael Creed (FG)
31st	2011	Áine Collins (FG)	Michael Moynihan (FF)	Michael Creed (FG)
32nd	2016	Aindrias Moynihan (FF)	Michael Moynihan (FF)	Michael Creed (FG)
33rd	2020	Aindrias Moynihan (FF)	Michael Moynihan (FF)	Michael Creed (FG)
34th	2024	Aindrias Moynihan (FF)	Michael Moynihan (FF)	John Paul O'Shea (FG)
