= John Paul O'Shea =

Irish politician

John Paul O'Shea TD
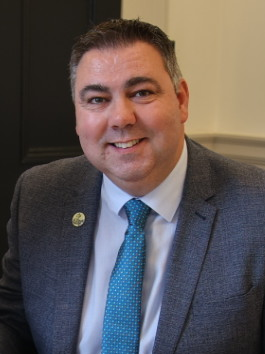
- O'Shea in 2024

Teachta Dála
- Incumbent
- Assumed office November 2024
- Constituency: Cork North-West

Personal details
- Born: 1982/1983 (age 42–43)
- Party: Fine Gael
- Other political affiliations: Independent (2009–2018)

John Paul O'Shea (born 1982/1983) is an Irish Fine Gael politician who has been a Teachta Dála (TD) for the Cork North-West constituency since the 2024 general election.

He was a member of Cork County Council from the Kanturk area from 2009 to 2024. He was elected to Cork County Council in 2009, as an independent and was re-elected in 2014. In 2016, he ran for the Dáil, as an independent but was eliminated on the ninth count. In 2018, he joined Fine Gael and was elected for that party at the 2019 and 2024 local elections.

O'Shea was elected on the 6th count in the 2024 election. He was subsequently appointed Cathaoirleach of the Committee on Social Protection, Rural and Community Development.

Dáil	Election	Deputy (Party)	Deputy (Party)	Deputy (Party)
22nd	1981	Thomas Meaney (FF)	Frank Crowley (FG)	Donal Creed (FG)
23rd	1982 (Feb)	Thomas Meaney (FF)	Frank Crowley (FG)	Donal Creed (FG)
24th	1982 (Nov)	Donal Moynihan (FF)	Frank Crowley (FG)	Donal Creed (FG)
25th	1987	Donal Moynihan (FF)	Frank Crowley (FG)	Donal Creed (FG)
26th	1989	Laurence Kelly (FF)	Frank Crowley (FG)	Michael Creed (FG)
27th	1992	Donal Moynihan (FF)	Frank Crowley (FG)	Michael Creed (FG)
28th	1997	Donal Moynihan (FF)	Michael Moynihan (FF)	Michael Creed (FG)
29th	2002	Donal Moynihan (FF)	Michael Moynihan (FF)	Gerard Murphy (FG)
30th	2007	Batt O'Keeffe (FF)	Michael Moynihan (FF)	Michael Creed (FG)
31st	2011	Áine Collins (FG)	Michael Moynihan (FF)	Michael Creed (FG)
32nd	2016	Aindrias Moynihan (FF)	Michael Moynihan (FF)	Michael Creed (FG)
33rd	2020	Aindrias Moynihan (FF)	Michael Moynihan (FF)	Michael Creed (FG)
34th	2024	Aindrias Moynihan (FF)	Michael Moynihan (FF)	John Paul O'Shea (FG)
