= Séamus McGrath =

Irish politician

Séamus McGrath TD
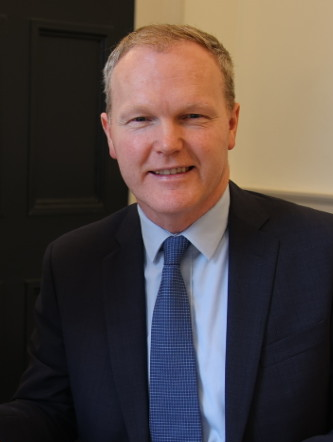
- McGrath in 2024

Teachta Dála
- Incumbent
- Assumed office November 2024
- Constituency: Cork South-Central

Personal details
- Born: 1973/1974 (age 51–52) Cork, Ireland
- Party: Fianna Fáil
- Spouse: Gayle McGrath
- Children: 3
- Relatives: Michael McGrath (brother)
- Education: University College Cork

Séamus McGrath (born 1973/1974) is an Irish Fianna Fáil politician who has been a Teachta Dála (TD) for the Cork South-Central constituency since the 2024 general election.

He was a member of Cork County Council from 2007 to 2024 for the Carrigaline area.

== Personal life ==
His brother is European Commissioner Michael McGrath.

A commerce graduate of University College Cork, McGrath worked in business before joining the Garda Síochána and serving as a probationer garda in Fermoy, leaving to manage his brother's 2007 election campaign. He lives in Carrigaline with his wife Gayle and three daughters.

Dáil	Election	Deputy (Party)	Deputy (Party)	Deputy (Party)	Deputy (Party)	Deputy (Party)
22nd	1981	Eileen Desmond (Lab)	Gene Fitzgerald (FF)	Pearse Wyse (FF)	Hugh Coveney (FG)	Peter Barry (FG)
23rd	1982 (Feb)	Eileen Desmond (Lab)	Gene Fitzgerald (FF)	Pearse Wyse (FF)	Jim Corr (FG)	Peter Barry (FG)
24th	1982 (Nov)	Eileen Desmond (Lab)	Gene Fitzgerald (FF)	Pearse Wyse (FF)	Hugh Coveney (FG)	Peter Barry (FG)
25th	1987	Toddy O'Sullivan (Lab)	John Dennehy (FF)	Batt O'Keeffe (FF)	Pearse Wyse (PDs)	Peter Barry (FG)
26th	1989	Toddy O'Sullivan (Lab)	John Dennehy (FF)	Micheál Martin (FF)	Pearse Wyse (PDs)	Peter Barry (FG)
27th	1992	Toddy O'Sullivan (Lab)	Batt O'Keeffe (FF)	Micheál Martin (FF)	Pat Cox (PDs)	Peter Barry (FG)
27th	1994 by-election	Toddy O'Sullivan (Lab)	Batt O'Keeffe (FF)	Micheál Martin (FF)	Hugh Coveney (FG)	Peter Barry (FG)
28th	1997	John Dennehy (FF)	Batt O'Keeffe (FF)	Micheál Martin (FF)	Hugh Coveney (FG)	Deirdre Clune (FG)
28th	1998 by-election	John Dennehy (FF)	Batt O'Keeffe (FF)	Micheál Martin (FF)	Simon Coveney (FG)	Deirdre Clune (FG)
29th	2002	John Dennehy (FF)	Batt O'Keeffe (FF)	Micheál Martin (FF)	Simon Coveney (FG)	Dan Boyle (GP)
30th	2007	Ciarán Lynch (Lab)	Michael McGrath (FF)	Micheál Martin (FF)	Simon Coveney (FG)	Deirdre Clune (FG)
31st	2011	Ciarán Lynch (Lab)	Michael McGrath (FF)	Micheál Martin (FF)	Simon Coveney (FG)	Jerry Buttimer (FG)
32nd	2016	Donnchadh Ó Laoghaire (SF)	Michael McGrath (FF)	Micheál Martin (FF)	Simon Coveney (FG)	4 seats 2016–2024
33rd	2020	Donnchadh Ó Laoghaire (SF)	Michael McGrath (FF)	Micheál Martin (FF)	Simon Coveney (FG)	4 seats 2016–2024
34th	2024	Donnchadh Ó Laoghaire (SF)	Séamus McGrath (FF)	Micheál Martin (FF)	Jerry Buttimer (FG)	Pádraig Rice (SD)
