= Cork County Council =

Local authority for County Cork in Ireland

Cork County Council Comhairle Contae Chorcaí

Type
- Type: County council

History
- Founded: 1 April 1899

Leadership
- Mayor: Bernard Moynihan, FF

Structure
- Seats: 55
- Political groups: Fine Gael (19) Fianna Fáil (18) Independent Ireland (4) Social Democrats (3) Labour (2) Sinn Féin (1) Aontú (1) Independent (7)

Elections
- Last election: 7 June 2024

Meeting place
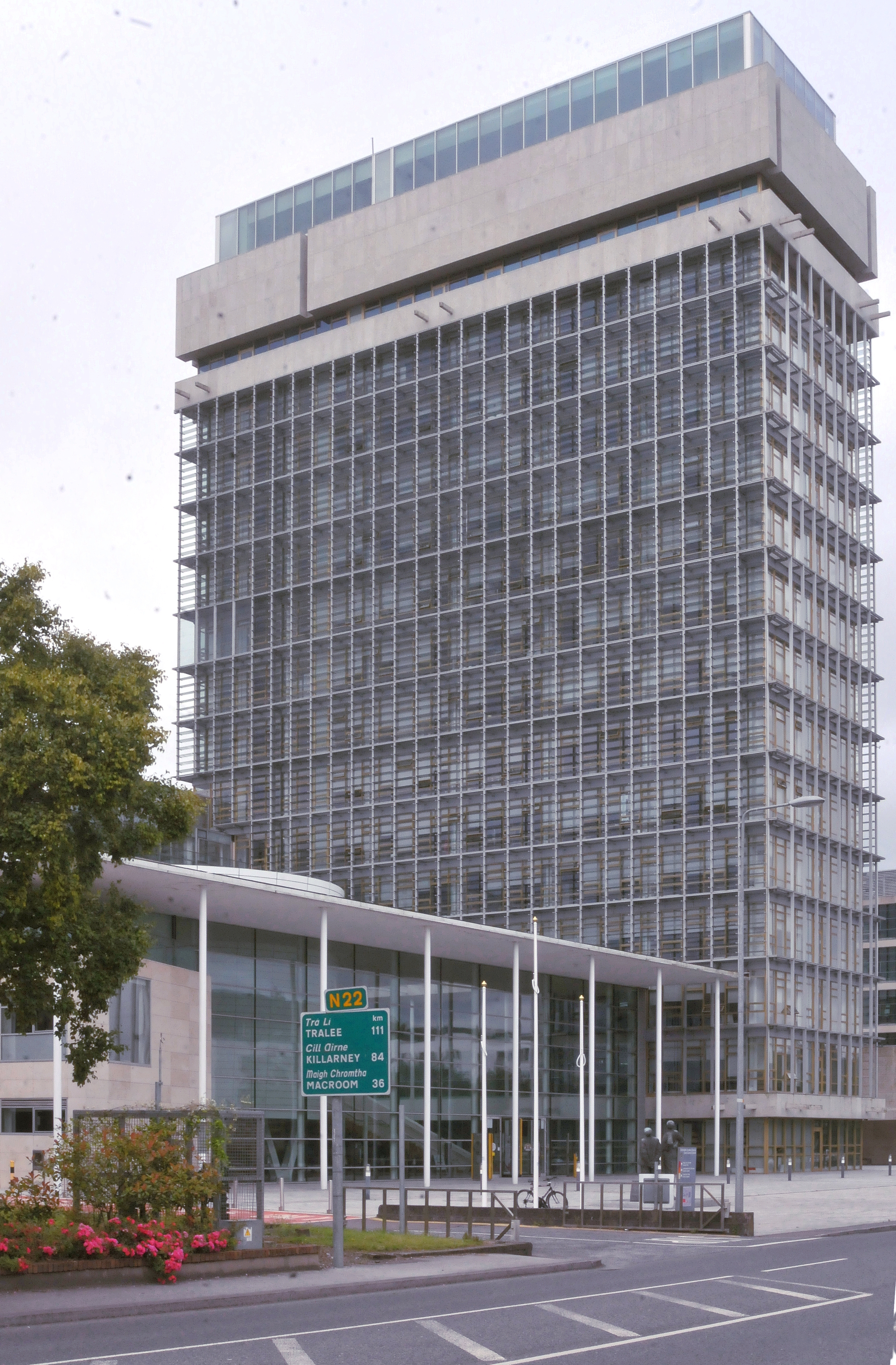
- County Hall, Cork

Website
- Official website

The area governed by the council

Cork County Council (Irish: Comhairle Contae Chorcaí) is the local authority of County Cork, Ireland. As a county council, it is governed by the Local Government Act 2001, as amended. The council is responsible for housing and community, roads and transportation, urban planning and development, amenity and culture, and environment. The council has 55 elected members. Elections are held every five years and are by single transferable vote. The head of the council has the title of Mayor. The county administration is headed by a chief executive, Moira Murrell. The county seat is Cork.

== History ==
Cork County Council was established on 1 April 1899 under the Local Government (Ireland) Act 1898 for the administrative county of County Cork. Before 1925, the chair of each rural district council sat as an ex officio member of the council. Under the Local Government Act 1925, rural district councils in Ireland were abolished and their functions transferred to the county councils. In County Cork, these were the districts of Bandon, Bantry, Castletown, Clonaklity, Cork, Dunmanway, Fermoy, Kanturk, Kinsale, Macroom, Mallow, Middleton, Millstreet, Michelstown No. 1, Skibbereen, Skull, and Youghal No. 1.

Originally meetings of Cork County Council were held in the back portion of the top floor of Cork Courthouse. By the 1950s these premises were becoming inadequate and County Hall opened in April 1968.

The area under the administration of Cork County Council was reduced in 1840, in 1955 and in 1965, ceding area to the city of Cork. The 2015 Cork Local Government Review recommended merging Cork City Council and Cork County Council into a single "super council"; however, a minority report opposed the merger, with a subsequent report published by an expert advisory group in 2017 recommending a city boundary extension. The area under the administration of Cork County Council was reduced on 31 May 2019, ceding territory to Cork City Council. This implemented changes under the Local Government Act 2019.

== Regional Assembly ==
Cork County Council has five representatives on the Southern Regional Assembly who are part of the South-West Strategic Planning Area Committee.

== Elections ==
Members of Cork County Council are elected for a five-year term of office on the electoral system of proportional representation by means of the single transferable vote (PR-STV) from multi-member local electoral areas (LEAs).

Year	FG	FF	SF	Lab	GP	SD	PDs	WP	II	Ind.	Total
2024	19	18	1	2	0	3	—N/a	0	4	8	55
2019	20	18	2	2	2	1	—N/a	0	—N/a	10	55
2014	16	17	10	2	0	—N/a	—N/a	0	—N/a	10	55
2009	22	12	1	7	0	—N/a	—N/a	0	—N/a	6	48
2004	24	16	1	5	0	—N/a	0	0	—N/a	2	48
1999	21	19	0	4	0	—N/a	1	0	—N/a	3	48
1991	20	19	0	4	0	—N/a	1	1	—N/a	3	48
1985	19	24	0	2	0	—N/a	—N/a	1	—N/a	2	48

== Local electoral areas and municipal districts ==
County Cork is divided into the municipal districts and local electoral areas, defined by electoral divisions.

Municipal District	LEA	Definition	Seats
Bandon–Kinsale		Abbeymahon, Ballinadee, Ballinspittle, Ballyfeard, Ballymackean, Ballymartle, Ballymodan, Ballymurphy, Bandon, Baurleigh, Boulteen, Brinny, Butlerstown, Cashel, Coolmain, Courtmacsherry, Cullen (in the former Rural District of Kinsale), Inishannon, Kilbrittain, Kilbrogan, Kilmaloda East, Kilmaloda West, Kilmonoge, Kinsale Rural, Kinsale Urban, Kinure, Knockavilly, Knockroe, Laherne, Leighmoney, Murragh, Nohaval, Rathclarin, Templemartin, Templemichael, Templeomalus and Timoleague.	6
Carrigaline		Ballyfoyle, Carrigaline (in the former rural district of Kinsale), Dunderrow, Farranbrien, Kilpatrick, Liscleary, Monkstown Urban, Templebreedy; and those parts of the electoral divisions of Ballygarvan, Carrigaline (in the former rural district of Cork), Douglas, Inishkenny, and Monkstown Rural that are not contained within the City of Cork.	6
Cobh		Ballynaglogh, Carrignavar, Carrigtohill, Cobh Rural, Cobh Urban, Killeagh (in the former Rural District of Cork), Knockraha, Watergrasshill; and those parts of the electoral divisions of Caherlag, Rathcooney (part), Riverstown and Whitechurch that are not contained within the City of Cork.	6
East Cork	Midleton	Ardagh, Ballintemple, Ballycottin, Ballyspillane, Castlemartyr, Clonmult, Clonpriest, Cloyne, Corkbeg, Dangan, Dungourney, Garryvoe, Ightermurragh, Inch, Kilcronat, Killeagh (in the former Rural District of Youghal No.1), Kilmacdonogh, Lisgoold, Midleton Rural, Midleton Urban, Mogeely, Rostellan, Templebodan, Templenacarriga, Youghal Rural (part) and Youghal Urban.	7
Fermoy		Aghern, Ballyarthur, Ballyhooly, Ballynoe, Carrig (in the former Rural District of Fermoy), Castle Hyde, Castlecooke, Castlelyons, Castletownroche, Clenor, Coole, Curraglass, Derryvillane, Doneraile, Farahy, Fermoy Rural, Fermoy Urban, Glanworth East, Glanworth West, Glenville, Gortnaskehy, Gortroe, Kilcor, Kilcummer, Kildinan, Kildorrery, Kilgullane, Killathy, Kilphelan, Kilworth, Knockmourne, Leitrim, Marshalstown, Mitchelstown, Monanimy, Rathcormack, Shanballymore, Skahanagh, Streamhill, Templemolaga and Wallstown.	6
Kanturk–Mallow	Kanturk	Allow, Ardskeagh, Ballyhoolahan, Banteer, Barleyhill, Barnacurra, Bawncross, Boherboy, Castlemagner, Clonfert East, Clonfert West, Clonmeen, Coolclogh, Crinnaloo, Cullen (in the former Rural District of Millstreet), Derragh, Doonasleen, Dromina, Glenlara, Greenane, Kanturk, Keale, Kilbrin, Kilcorney, Kilmeen, Knockatooan, Knocknagree, Knocktemple, Meens, Milford, Milltown, Newmarket, Newtown, Rathcool, Rathluirc, Rosnalee, Rowls, Skagh, Springfort, Tullylease and Williamstown.	4
Kanturk–Mallow	Mallow	Ballyclogh, Ballynamona, Blackpool, Buttevant, Caherduggan, Carrig (in the former rural District of Mallow), Castlecor, Churchtown, Dromore, Gortmore, Imphrick, Kilmaclenine, Kilshannig, Knockantota, Liscarroll, Mallow North Urban, Mallow Rural, Mallow South Urban, Nad, Rahan, Roskeen, Templemary and Tincoora.	5
Macroom		Aghinagh, Aglish, An Sliabh Riabhach, Ballygroman, Béal Átha an Ghaorthaidh (Maigh Chromta) (in the former Rural District of Macroom), Béal Átha an Ghaorthaidh (Dún Mánmhaí) (in the former Rural District of Dunmanway), Bealock, Caherbarnagh, Cannaway, Carrigboy, Ceann Droma, Cill na Martra, Claonráth, Clondrohid, Clonmoyle, Coomlogane, Doire Fhínín, Dripsey, Drishane, Firmount, Gort na Tiobratan, Gowlane, Greenfort, Greenville, Inchigeelagh, Kilberrihert, Kilbonane, Kilcullen, Macloneigh, Macroom Urban, Magourney, Mashanaglass, Mountrivers, Moviddy, Na hUláin, Rahalisk, Teerelton, Warrenscourt; and those parts of the electoral divisions of Ballincollig, Blarney, Carrigrohanebeg, Matehy and Ovens that are not contained within the City of Cork.	6
West Cork	Bantry–West Cork	Adrigole, Aghadown North, Aghadown South, Ahil, Ballybane, Ballydehob, Bantry Rural, Bantry Urban, Bear, Bredagh, Caheragh, Cloghdonnell, Coolagh, Coulagh, Crookhaven, Curryglass, Douce, Dromdaleague North, Dromdaleague South, Dunbeacon, Dunmanus, Durrus East, Durrus West, Garranes, Garrown, Glanlough, Glengarriff, Goleen, Gortnascreeny, Kealkill, Kilcaskan, Kilcatherine, Kilcoe, Killaconenagh, Killeenleagh, Kilnamanagh, Lowertown, Mealagh, Milane, Scart, Seefin, Sheepshead, Skull, Toormore and Whiddy.	4
West Cork	Skibbereen–West Cork	Ardfield, Argideen, Aultagh, Ballingurteen, Ballymoney, Bengour, Cahermore, Carrigbaun, Castlehaven North, Castlehaven South, Castletown, Castleventry, Cléire, Clonakilty Rural, Clonakilty Urban, Cloonkeen, Coolcraheen, Coolmountain, Derry, Drinagh (in the former Rural District of Dunmanway), Drinagh (in the former Rural District of Skibbereen), Dunmanway North, Dunmanway South, Kilfaughnabeg, Kilkerranmore, Kilmoylerane, Kilnagross, Kinneigh, Knocks, Knockskagh, Manch, Myross, Rathbarry, Rosscarbery, Rossmore, Shreelane, Skibbereen Rural, Skibbereen Urban, Teadies, Tullagh and Woodfort	5

== Councillors ==
The following were elected at the 2024 Cork County Council election.

=== 2024 seats summary ===
Party	Seats
Fianna Fáil	19
Fine Gael	18
Independent Ireland	4
Social Democrats	3
Labour	2
Sinn Féin	1
Independent	8

=== Councillors by electoral area ===
This list reflects the order in which councillors were elected on 7 June 2024.

Council members from 2024 election
Local electoral area	Name	Party
Bandon–Kinsale	Alan Coleman	Independent
Bandon–Kinsale	John Collins	Independent Ireland
Bandon–Kinsale	John Michael Foley	Fine Gael
Bandon–Kinsale	Ann Bambury	Social Democrats
Bandon–Kinsale	Gillian Coughlan	Fianna Fáil
Bandon–Kinsale	Marie O'Sullivan	Fine Gael
Bantry–West Cork	Danny Collins	Independent Ireland
Bantry–West Cork	Finbarr Harrington	Independent
Bantry–West Cork	Caroline Cronin	Fine Gael
Bantry–West Cork	Patrick Gerard Murphy (Note: Replaced during term, see table below for details.)	Fianna Fáil
Carrigaline	Séamus McGrath	Fianna Fáil
Carrigaline	Ben Dalton O'Sullivan	Independent
Carrigaline	Jack White	Fine Gael
Carrigaline	Audrey Buckley	Fianna Fáil
Carrigaline	Úna McCarthy	Fine Gael
Carrigaline	Eoghan Fahy	Sinn Féin
Cobh	Sheila O'Callaghan	Fianna Fáil
Cobh	Anthony Barry	Fine Gael
Cobh	Sinéad Sheppard	Fine Gael
Cobh	Cathal Rasmussen	Labour
Cobh	Ger Curley	Independent Ireland
Cobh	Dominic Finn	Fianna Fáil
Fermoy	William O'Leary	Independent
Fermoy	Noel McCarthy	Fine Gael
Fermoy	Frank O'Flynn	Fianna Fáil
Fermoy	Deirdre O'Brien	Fianna Fáil
Fermoy	Nelius Cotter	Fianna Fáil
Fermoy	Peter O'Donoghue (Note: Changed party, see table for details.)	Independent
Kanturk	Bernard Moynihan	Fianna Fáil
Kanturk	John Paul O'Shea	Fine Gael
Kanturk	Trish Murphy	Fine Gael
Kanturk	Ian Doyle	Fianna Fáil
Macroom	Gobnait Moynihan	Fianna Fáil
Macroom	Michael Creed	Fine Gael
Macroom	Michael Looney	Fianna Fáil
Macroom	Eileen Lynch	Fine Gael
Macroom	Ted Lucey	Fine Gael
Macroom	Martin Coughlan	Independent
Mallow	Tony O'Shea	Fine Gael
Mallow	Liam Madden	Fine Gael
Mallow	Eoghan Kenny	Labour
Mallow	Gearóid Murphy	Fianna Fáil
Mallow	Pat Hayes	Fianna Fáil
Midleton	Mary Linehan Foley	Independent
Midleton	Michael Hegarty	Fine Gael
Midleton	Liam Quaide	Social Democrats
Midleton	Patrick Mulcahy	Fianna Fáil
Midleton	Rory Cocking	Fine Gael
Midleton	Ann Marie Ahern	Fianna Fáil
Midleton	John Buckley	Independent
Skibbereen–West Cork	Noel O'Donovan	Fine Gael
Skibbereen–West Cork	Joe Carroll	Fianna Fáil
Skibbereen–West Cork	Deirdre Kelly	Fianna Fáil
Skibbereen–West Cork	Daniel Sexton	Independent Ireland
Skibbereen–West Cork	Isobel Towse	Social Democrats

==== Co-options ====
Party	Outgoing	LEA	Reason	Date	Co-optee
Labour	Eoghan Kenny	Mallow	Elected to 34th Dáil at the 2024 general election	20 December 2024	Ronan Sheehan
Fianna Fáil	Séamus McGrath	Carrigaline	Elected to 34th Dáil at the 2024 general election	20 December 2024	Patrick Donovan
Fine Gael	Noel McCarthy	Fermoy	Elected to 34th Dáil at the 2024 general election	20 December 2024	Kay Dawson
Fine Gael	John Paul O'Shea	Kanturk	Elected to 34th Dáil at the 2024 general election	20 December 2024	Aileen Browne
Social Democrats	Liam Quaide	Midleton	Elected to 34th Dáil at the 2024 general election	20 December 2024	Eamonn Horgan
Fine Gael	Eileen Lynch	Macroom	Elected to the 27th Seanad at the 2025 Seanad election	21 April 2025	Kate Lynch
Fine Gael	Noel O'Donovan	Skibbereen–West Cork	Nominated to the 27th Seanad	21 April 2025	Brendan McCarthy
Fianna Fáil	Patrick Gerard Murphy	Bantry–West Cork	Death of councillor	13 September 2025	George Gill
Fine Gael	Michael Creed	Macroom	Death of councillor	3 June 2026	Gerry Healy
Fianna Fáil	Joe Carroll	Skibbereen–West Cork	Death of Councillor	3 June 2026	Alan Dromey

==== Changes in affiliation ====
Name	LEA	Elected as	New affiliation	Date
Peter O'Donoghue	Fermoy	Independent	Aontú	14 January 2026
