= 1985 Cork County Council election =

Part of the 1985 Irish local elections

← 1979	20 June 1985	1991 →

All 48 seats on Cork County Council
	First party	Second party	Third party
Party	Fianna Fáil	Fine Gael	Labour
Seats won	24	19	2
Seat change	+3	0	-1
	Fourth party	Fifth party
Party	Workers' Party	Independent
Seats won	1	2
Seat change	0	0
- Map showing the area of Cork County Council
Council control after election
TBD

An election to Cork County Council took place on 20 June 1985 as part of that year's Irish local elections. 48 councillors were elected from eight local electoral areas (LEAs) for a five-year term of office on the electoral system of proportional representation by means of the single transferable vote (PR-STV). This term was extended for a further year, to 1991.

== Results by party ==
Party	Seats	±	First Pref. votes	FPv%	±%
Fianna Fáil	24	+3	54,692	46.97	
Fine Gael	19	0	44,924	38.58	
Labour	2	-1	5,431	4.66	
Workers' Party	1	0	4,370	3.75	
Independent	2	0	6,388	5.49	
Totals	48	+2	116,444	100.00	—

== Results by local electoral area ==
=== Bandon ===
Bandon: 7 seats
Party	Candidate	FPv%	Count							
Party	Candidate	FPv%	1	2	3	4	5	6	7	8
Fine Gael	Michael Creed TD*		3,521							
Fianna Fáil	Peter Callanan*		3,007							
Fianna Fáil	Donal Moynihan TD*		2,921							
Fine Gael	Eddie Lucey*		2,448							
Fine Gael	Denis O'Reilly*		1,952	2,015	2,123	2,134	2,167	2,332	2,363	2,557
Fine Gael	John Kelleher*		1,947	2,592						
Fianna Fáil	Jim Long*		1,619	1,694	2,005	2,350	2,407	2,419		
Independent	Dermot Ryan		1,105	1,122	1,139	1,150	1,200	1,201	1,203	1,508
Fianna Fáil	Michael Ring		884	901	1,013	1,145	1,164	1,165	1,167	
Independent	Maurice Hurley		166	187	233	242				
Electorate: 28,858 Valid: 19,300 (67.67%) Spoilt: 229 Quota: 2,413 Turnout: 19,529

=== Cork North ===
Cork North: 4 seats
Party	Candidate	FPv%	Count		
Party	Candidate	FPv%	1	2	3
Fianna Fáil	Denis Lyons TD*		2,107		
Fine Gael	Tomas Ryan*		1,622	1,669	
Fianna Fáil	Donal O'Connell*		1,363	1,539	1,685
Fine Gael	George Osborne*		1,240	1,258	1,626
Fianna Fáil	Michael Granitch		980	1,171	1,307
Labour	Helen Sheehan		543	565	
Workers' Party	Patrick Corbett		345	357	
Electorate: 17,134 Valid: 8,200 (48.32%) Spoilt: 80 Quota: 1,641 Turnout: 8,280

=== Cork South ===
Cork South: 6 seats
Party	Candidate	FPv%	Count						
Party	Candidate	FPv%	1	2	3	4	5	6	7
Fianna Fáil	Barry Cogan*		2,177						
Fianna Fáil	Batt O'Keeffe		1,855						
Fianna Fáil	John Coleman		1,389	1,678	1,750				
Fine Gael	Phil Brown		985	1,008	1,009	1,019	1,075	1,286	1,710
Fianna Fáil	Joe O'Reilly		978	1,032	1,071	1,133	1,268	1,441	1,468
Fine Gael	Connell Fanning		926	930	955	1,024	1,056	1,148	
Fine Gael	Braham Brennan		924	961	962	983	1,018	1,195	1,591
Labour	Paula Desmond		840	891	896	1,172	1,319	1,397	1,541
Fine Gael	Jim Daly		695	701	702	709	781		
Independent	Mark Hanley		625	638	641	655			
Labour	Gus Desmond		444	452	468				
Electorate: 33,220 Valid: 14,021 (42.2%) Spoilt: 99 Quota: 2,004 Turnout: 14,120 (42.5%)

=== Kanturk ===
Kanturk: 6 seats
Party	Candidate	FPv%	Count						
Party	Candidate	FPv%	1	2	3	4	5	6	7
Fine Gael	Frank Crowley TD*		2,477						
Fianna Fáil	Jack Roche*		2,301						
Fianna Fáil	Mike Donegan*		1,842	1,886	1,899	2,124	2,154	2,183	2,186
Fine Gael	Charles Barry*		1,606	1,752	1,843	1,881	2,281		
Fianna Fáil	J.B. Murphy		1,590	1,655	1,664	1,995	2,227		
Fine Gael	Richard Green		1,360	1,466	1,507	1,525	1,909	1,913	1,965
Fianna Fáil	Laurence Kelly		1,356	1,468	1,494	1,892	1,952	1,995	1,996
Fine Gael	Noel Buckley		1,140	1,283	1,323	1,390			
Labour	Michael J. Howard*		1,137	1,185	1,217				
Labour	Danny Buckley	0.6%	760						
Electorate: 22,109 Valid: 15,569 (71.09%) Spoilt: 132 Quota: 2,225 Turnout: 15,701

=== Mallow ===
Mallow: 7 seats
Party	Candidate	FPv%	Count							
Party	Candidate	FPv%	1	2	3	4	5	6	7	8
Workers' Party	Joe Sherlock*		3,447							
Fianna Fáil	Ned O'Keeffe TD		3,112							
Fianna Fáil	Carey Joyce*		2,728							
Fine Gael	Jim Sarsfield*		1,711	1,764	1,790	1,821	1,837	1,874	1,889	1,997
Fine Gael	Dick Fitzgerald*		1,675	1,748	1,804	1,814	1,847	1,867	1,884	2,097
Fine Gael	Paul Bradford		1,347	1,439	1,453	1,456	1,614	1,687	1,749	2,487
Fianna Fáil	Gerry Sheedy		1,298	1,454	1,737	1,866	1,887	2,025	2,234	2,313
Fine Gael	Michael Broderick*		1,247	1,298	1,316	1,319	1,366	1,483	1,679	
Fianna Fáil	Ted O'Riordan		1,071	1,204	1,310	1,338	1,469	1,561	2,134	2,230
Fianna Fáil	Gerry Fitzpatrick*		1,050	1,143	1,234	1,257	1,308	1,450		
Independent	John O'Keeffe		689	787	815	833	881			
Labour	Tadhg Curtis		463	681	691	694				
Electorate: 30,365 Valid: 19,838 (65.81%) Spoilt: 144 Quota: 2,480 Turnout: 19,982

=== Midleton ===
Midleton: 6 seats
Party	Candidate	FPv%	Count								
Party	Candidate	FPv%	1	2	3	4	5	6	7	8	9
Fine Gael	Michael Hegarty		2,296	2,327							
Independent	Noel Collins*		2,059	2,170	2,367						
Fianna Fáil	Maurice Ahern*		1,885	1,901	1,970	1,973	1,985	2,022	2,067	2,080	2,485
Fine Gael	Matt Ahern*		1,824	1,841	1,885	1,886	1,886	1,988	2,005	2,205	2,273
Fianna Fáil	John Brosnan*		1,794	1,807	1,827	1,828	1,828	2,051	2,106	2,119	2,262
Fianna Fáil	Kevin Foster*		1,703	1,736	1,756	1,757	1,757	1,773	1,950	2,226	2,373
Fine Gael	Nuala Murphy*		1,055	1,087	1,157	1,160	1,169	1,191	1,224	1,419	1,477
Fianna Fáil	Micheal Lombard		808	821	852	852	858	869	884	888	
Fine Gael	Stella Meade		657	686	697	702	705	739	858		
Labour	Thomas O Conaill		584	607	613	614	618				
Workers' Party	Leo Owens		578	617	629	630	632	702			
Independent	Donal Wall		505	526							
Green	Sean Bell		355								
Electorate: 26,391 Valid: 16,150 (62.02%) Spoilt: 218 Quota: 2,220 Turnout: 16,368

=== Skibbereen ===
Skibbereen: 7 seats
Party	Candidate	FPv%	Count						
Party	Candidate	FPv%	1	2	3	4	5	6	7
Fianna Fáil	Joe Walsh TD*		3,569						
Fine Gael	John Cal McCarthy*		2,349						
Fianna Fáil	D.F. O'Sullivan*		2,049						
Fine Gael	John L. O'Sullivan*		1,682	2,056					
Labour	Michael Calnan		1,393	1,470	1,529	1,582	1,590	1,616	2,035
Fianna Fáil	Tom O'Neill*		1,233	1,866	1,892	1,969			
Fine Gael	Mary Burke*		1,089	1,125	1,246	1,277	1,290	1,311	1,860
Fine Gael	Michael Collins		1,039	1,077	1,234	1,248	1,251	1,264	
Fianna Fáil	Jim Kingston		888	1,306	1,328	1,443	1,510	1,548	1,604
Sinn Féin	Donnchadh O Sé		371	406	412				
Electorate: 22,043 Valid: 15,662 (71.5%) Spoilt: 154 Quota: 1,958 Turnout: 15,816

=== Schull ===
Schull: 5 seats
Party	Candidate	FPv%	Count					
Party	Candidate	FPv%	1	2	3	4	5	6
Fianna Fáil	Denis O'Donovan		1,875					
Fine Gael	P.J. Sheehan TD*		1,638	1,718				
Fine Gael	Michael Harrington*		1,325	1,330	1,338	1,382	1,801	
Independent	Michael Pat Murphy*		1,192	1,227	1,272	1,420	1,478	1,532
Fine Gael	James Crowley		1,150	1,165	1,179	1,254	1,273	1,302
Fianna Fáil	Vivian O'Callaghan*		1,125	1,216	1,260	1,345	1,845	
Fianna Fáil	Dan Harrington*		995	1,031	1,060	1,077		
Labour	Corney Murphy*		404	414	437			
Sinn Féin	Thomas Coghlan		183	188				
Electorate: 13,403 Valid: 9,887 (70%) Spoilt: 74 Quota: 1,648 Turnout: 9,961
