= 1991 Cork County Council election =

Part of the 1991 Irish local elections

← 1985	27 June 1991	1999 →

All 48 seats on Cork County Council
	First party	Second party	Third party
Party	Fine Gael	Fianna Fáil	Labour
Seats won	20	19	4
Seat change	+1	-5	+2
	Fourth party	Fifth party	Sixth party
Party	Progressive Democrats	Workers' Party	Independent
Seats won	1	1	3
Seat change	+1	0	+1
- Map showing the area of Cork County Council
Council control after election
TBD

An election to Cork County Council took place on 27 June 1991 as part of that year's Irish local elections. 48 councillors were elected from eight local electoral areas (LEAs) for a five-year term of office on the electoral system of proportional representation by means of the single transferable vote (PR-STV). This term was extended twice, first to 1998, then to 1999.

== Results by party ==
Party	Seats	±	First Pref. votes	FPv%	±%
Fine Gael	20	+1	41,742	35.4	
Fianna Fáil	19	-5	43,211	36.7	
Labour	4	+2	7,246	6.2	
Progressive Democrats	1	+1	6,463	5.5	
Workers' Party	1	0	5,097	4.3	
Independent	3	+1	11,205	9.5	
Totals	48	0	117,899	100.0	—

== Results by local electoral area ==
=== Bandon ===
Bandon - 7 seats
Party	Candidate	FPv%	Count											
Party	Candidate	FPv%	1	2	3	4	5	6	7	8	9	10	11	12
Fine Gael	Michael Creed TD*	17.1%	3,267											
Fianna Fáil	Peter Callanan*	14.6%	2,797											
Fianna Fáil	Donal Moynihan*	13.2%	2,519											
Fine Gael	Eddie Lucey*	12.3%	2,347	2,489										
Fine Gael	Kevin Murphy*	12%	2,301	2,327	2,376	2,377	2,433							
Fine Gael	Frank Metcalfe	7.1%	1,366	1,730	1,735	1,739	1,748	1,778	1,842	1,917	2,088	2,438		
Fianna Fáil	Jim Long*	5.2%	1,004	1,061	1,150	1,228	1,231	1,261	1,286	1,301	1,401	1,587	1,588	1,607
Fianna Fáil	Alan Coleman	4.8%	916	923	1,091	1,106	1,121	1,244	1,248	1,403	1,497	1,585	1,596	1,614
Green	Paula Giles	3.6%	695	724	759	763	787	858	864	964				
Progressive Democrats	Jerry Kelleher	3.5%	672	905	910	932	936	951	965	1,123	1,294			
Progressive Democrats	John Kevin Coleman*	3.2%	605	613	648	650	661	712	718					
Independent	Dermot Ryan	2.4%	468	473	481	482	499							
Independent	Frank Collins	0.9%	170	175	187	188								
Electorate: 30,218 Valid: 19,127 (63.3%) Spoilt: 172 Quota: 2,391 Turnout: 19,289 (63.8%)

=== Cork North ===
Cork North - 4 seats
Party	Candidate	FPv%	Count					
Party	Candidate	FPv%	1	2	3	4	5	6
Fine Gael	Tomas Ryan*	16.9%	1,569	1,604	1,698	1,741	2,554	
Fianna Fáil	Dan Fleming*	13.5%	1,253	1,285	1,357	1,676	1,759	1,860
Fianna Fáil	Annette McNamara	12.3%	1,137	1,202	1,297	1,469	1,516	1,576
Fianna Fáil	Tom Joyce	10.5%	975	1,007	1,153	1,482	1,524	1,563
Fianna Fáil	Donal O'Connell*	10.5%	968	986	1,086			
Fine Gael	George Osborne*	10.3%	953	990	1,143	1,223		
Labour	Sheila O'Sullivan	9.8%	912	1,155	1,378	1,454	1,591	1,856
Progressive Democrats	Michael Burns	9.5%	884	972				
Workers' Party	Patrick Corbett	3.8%	353					
Green	Thomas Hyland	2.8%	257					
Electorate: 19,771 Valid: 9,261 (46.8%) Spoilt: 64 Quota: 1,853 Turnout: 9,325 (47.2%)

=== Cork South ===
Cork South - 6 seats
Party	Candidate	FPv%	Count										
Party	Candidate	FPv%	1	2	3	4	5	6	7	8	9	10	11
Fianna Fáil	Senator Batt O'Keeffe*	22%	3,081										
Fianna Fáil	Barry Cogan*	11.5%	1,614	1,906	1,918	1,935	1,965	2,001	2,400				
Labour	Paula Desmond*	8.5%	1,195	1,230	1,238	1,488	1,700	1,773	1,842	1,873	1,979	2,427	
Fine Gael	Sylvester Cotter	6.9%	968	982	1,033	1,043	1,061	1,203	1,257	1,267	1,608	1,665	1,707
Independent	Kevin Meaney	6.9%	966	996	1,010	1,024	1,174	1,204	1,290	1,320	1,367		
Fine Gael	Braham Brennan*	6.8%	953	967	1,019	1,027	1,055	1,100	1,161	1,177	1,423	1,639	1,718
Fine Gael	Barry O'Mahony	5.9%	827	877	1,003	1,026	1,048	1,065	1,074	1,077			
Fianna Fáil	Mary Buwalda-Wagner	5.6%	785	915	920	928	943	967					
Progressive Democrats	Derry Canty	5.4%	757	931	1,029	1,184	1,213	1,562	1,616	1,625	1,748	1,867	1,918
Progressive Democrats	Peter Kelly	5.2%	725	740	749	759	808						
Fianna Fáil	Mary Connole	4.7%	656	850	854	860	922	981	1,158	1,378	1,426	1,513	1,538
Workers' Party	Con O'Mahony	4.4%	613	633	647	691							
Labour	Tony Lancaster	3.4%	475	524	578								
Fine Gael	Liam Ward	2.9%	406	466									
Electorate: 33,220 Valid: 14,021 (42.2%) Spoilt: 99 Quota: 2,004 Turnout: 14,120 (42.5%)

=== Kanturk ===
Kanturk - 6 seats
Party	Candidate	FPv%	Count						
Party	Candidate	FPv%	1	2	3	4	5	6	7
Fine Gael	Frank Crowley TD*	16.7%	2,610						
Fianna Fáil	Jack Roche*	13.2%	2,067	2,071	2,096	2,162	2,307		
Fianna Fáil	Laurence Kelly TD*	10.8%	1,689	1,693	1,729	1,762	1,811	2,417	
Fine Gael	Billy Biggane	10.6%	1,652	1,662	1,715	1,735	2,068	2,371	
Fianna Fáil	J.B. Murphy*	10%	1,555	1,557	1,568	1,749	1,828	2,058	2,222
Fine Gael	Gerard Murphy	9.5%	1,480	1,480	1,543	1,673	2,153	2,198	2,212
Fianna Fáil	Mike Donegan*	8.8%	1,377	1,395	1,405	1,418	1,439		
Labour	Bill Cashin	8.5%	1,327	1,358	1,414	1,495	1,623	1,724	1,733
Fine Gael	Charles Barry*	7.5%	1,168	1,173	1,284	1,325			
Progressive Democrats	Sean O'Riordan	3.8%	593	601	616				
Workers' Party	Dan Curtin	0.6%	89						
Electorate: 22,012 Valid: 15,604 (70.9%) Spoilt: 89 Quota: 2,230 Turnout: 15,693 (71.3%)

=== Mallow ===
Mallow - 7 seats
Party	Candidate	FPv%	Count														
Party	Candidate	FPv%	1	2	3	4	5	6	7	8	9	10	11	12	13	14	15
Fianna Fáil	Ned O'Keeffe TD*	17.5%	3,419														
Fine Gael	Paul Bradford TD*	14.1%	2,761														
Workers' Party	Joe Sherlock TD*	13.6%	2,650														
Fianna Fáil	Carey Joyce*	8.4%	1,633	2,041	2,052	2,058	2,142	2,158	2,218	2,247	2,266	2,393	2,517				
Fine Gael	Conor O'Callaghan	6.7%	1,313	1,430	1,473	1,479	1,507	1,522	1,543	1,685	1,748	1,885	1,908	2,086	2,089	2,159	2,262
Fine Gael	Aileen Pyne	6.7%	1,306	1,335	1,388	1,396	1,461	1,490	1,604	1,612	1,650	1,740	1,956	2,519			
Fianna Fáil	Ted O'Riordan	4.1%	806	943	968	989	994	1,038	1,051	1,058	1,085	1,177	1,191	1,201	1,212	1,214	1,492
Fine Gael	Michael Lane	4.1%	794	813	876	878	886	892	912	915	988	1,023	1,035				
Fianna Fáil	Brendan Kelleher	4%	780	867	877	886	895	906	911	915	1,108	1,165	1,171	1,189	1,197	1,198	1,288
Independent	Tom Conroy	3.4%	667	684	711	741	748	863	919	930	981	1,045	1,110	1,127	1,132	1,135	
Independent	Michael Broderick	3.4%	655	676	710	725	731	752	780	785							
Progressive Democrats	Naoise Leamy	3.1%	603	638	653	664	752	772	803	821	886						
Workers' Party	Tadhg O'Donovan	2.9%	557	569	571	601	615	636	687	900	910	928					
Workers' Party	John Fitzgerald	2.3%	453	508	510	535	540	563	590								
Green	Jim Bartley	2.1%	410	423	429	435	468	511									
Labour	Tadhg Curtis	1.9%	372	381	404	439	442										
Progressive Democrats	John Guinevan	1.9%	372	378	383	385											
Electorate: 31,117 Valid: 19,540 (62.8%) Spoilt: 118 Quota: 2,443 Turnout: 19,658 (63.2%)

=== Midleton ===
Midleton - 6 seats
Party	Candidate	FPv%	Count												
Party	Candidate	FPv%	1	2	3	4	5	6	7	8	9	10	11	12	13
Independent	Paddy Hegarty	16.4%	2,552												
Independent	Noel Collins*	13.3%	2,059	2,113	2,120	2,171	2,182	2,201	2,288						
Fianna Fáil	Maurice Ahern*	10.5%	1,639	1,660	1,665	1,692	1,697	1,701	1,734	1,754	1,765	1,817	1,865	1,922	2,267
Fine Gael	Matt Ahern*	10%	1,559	1,618	1,624	1,632	1,634	1,638	1,669	1,675	1,733	1,773	1,825	2,106	2,167
Fine Gael	Michael Hegarty*	9%	1,402	1,449	1,454	1,465	1,469	1,477	1,525	1,533	1,542	1,576	1,640	1,950	2,005
Fianna Fáil	John Brosnan*	7.3%	1,131	1,159	1,165	1,165	1,169	1,170	1,197	1,200	1,298	1,341	1,393	1,408	1,637
Fianna Fáil	Kevin Foster*	6.8%	1,062	1,072	1,105	1,107	1,125	1,175	1,183	1,184	1,188	1,200	1,326	1,338	
Labour	John Mulvihill*	6.5%	1,003	1,025	1,052	1,068	1,147	1,272	1,300	1,304	1,351	1,450	1,554	1,592	1,958
Fine Gael	George Jeffrey	4.9%	768	797	805	806	810	815	850	855	858	860	915		
Independent	William Kidney	2.8%	441	453	473	478	483	508	515	518	541				
Independent	Bob Bickerdike	2.4%	371	385	387	391	401	434	441	442					
Progressive Democrats	Michael Joy	2.3%	362	372	383	391	396	400							
Green	Sean Bell	2.3%	350	361	370	375	394	411	460	468	560	603			
Independent	Maurice Quinlan	1.9%	288	293	314	315	351								
Workers' Party	Leo Owens	1.3%	196	199	202	239									
Workers' Party	Tom Cashman	1.2%	186	189	189										
Independent	Jack Twomey	1.1%	167	171											
Electorate: 28,321 Valid: 15,536 (54.9%) Spoilt: 128 Quota: 2,220 Turnout: 15,664 (55.3%)

=== Skibbereen ===
Skibbereen - 7 seats
Party	Candidate	FPv%	Count									
Party	Candidate	FPv%	1	2	3	4	5	6	7	8	9	10
Fine Gael	John Cal McCarthy*	15.3%	2,346									
Fianna Fáil	Donal O'Rourke*	11.6%	1,768	1,803	1,836	1,855	1,865	2,094				
Fianna Fáil	D.F. O'Sullivan*	11%	1,688	1,703	1,780	1,806	1,943					
Fine Gael	Jim O'Sullivan	9.4%	1,440	1,577	1,610	1,621	1,641	1,889	1,890	1,973		
Labour	Michael Calnan*	9.1%	1,387	1,411	1,443	1,549	1,592	1,636	1,638	1,651	1,655	1,982
Fianna Fáil	Tom O'Neill*	8%	1,231	1,247	1,272	1,360	1,378	1,440	1,446	1,480	1,492	1,682
Fine Gael	Tadhg O'Donovan	7.7%	1,179	1,227	1,240	1,260	1,379	1,485	1,496	1,506	1,512	1,991
Fine Gael	Michael Collins	6.9%	1,058	1,123	1,131	1,250	1,268	1,308	1,308	1,312	1,313	
Progressive Democrats	Ray O'Neill	5.9%	901	952	977	1,013	1,067					
Green	Mary O'Donnell	5.4%	828	845	917	959	1,119	1,302	1,311	1,344	1,358	1,424
Independent	John Collins	3.6%	544	549	618	636						
Independent	Donal Lehane	3.2%	497	508	522							
Sinn Féin	Donnchadh O Sé	1.9%	294	301								
Sinn Féin	Seamus de Burca	0.9%	144	145								
Electorate: 22,677 Valid: 15,305 (67.5%) Spoilt: 120 Quota: 1,914 Turnout: 15,425 (68%)

=== Schull ===
Schull - 5 seats
Party	Candidate	FPv%	Count				
Party	Candidate	FPv%	1	2	3	4	5
Fine Gael	P.J. Sheehan TD*	19.4%	1,840				
Fianna Fáil	Senator Denis O'Donovan*	19.2%	1,827				
Independent	Michael Pat Murphy*	14.3%	1,360	1,452	1,502	1,637	
Fine Gael	Michael Harrington*	13.2%	1,256	1,298	1,305	1,369	1,842
Fianna Fáil	Vivian O'Callaghan*	10.8%	1,022	1,036	1,131	1,245	1,518
Fine Gael	John P. O'Shea	9%	853	935	965	1,151	1,177
Fianna Fáil	Dan Harrington	8.5%	812	817	851	890	
Labour	Matt Kingston	6%	575	589	609		
Electorate: 13,584 Valid: 9,505 (70%) Spoilt: 86 Quota: 1,591 Turnout: 9,591 (70.6%)
