= Cork Mid =

Cork Mid (or Mid Cork) may refer to one of two parliamentary constituencies in County Cork, in the South of Ireland

- Mid Cork (UK Parliament constituency), a single-seat constituency used for the election to the United Kingdom Parliament in 1918, but whose MP took his seat instead as TD in the first Dáil Éireann
- Cork Mid (Dáil constituency), a 4-seat (later 5-seat) constituency represented in Dáil Éireann 1961–1981
