= Daniel Corkery =

Daniel Corkery may refer to:

- Daniel Corkery (author) (1878–1964), author of The Hidden Ireland, teacher, senator 1951–1954
- Daniel Corkery (Irish republican) (1883–1961), Irish politician and old IRA Commandant, TD 1921–1932 and 1933–1937, senator 1938–1948
