= Batt Donegan =

Irish politician (1910–1978)

Senator
- In office 28 November 1963 – 23 June 1965
- Constituency: Agricultural Panel

Teachta Dála
- In office March 1957 – October 1961
- Constituency: Cork North

Personal details
- Born: Bartholomew Donegan; 21 December 1910 County Cork, Ireland
- Died: 26 August 1978 (aged 67) County Cork, Ireland
- Party: Fianna Fáil

Bartholomew Donegan (21 December 1910 – 26 August 1978) was a Fianna Fáil politician from County Cork in Ireland. He was a Teachta Dála (TD) from 1957 to 1961, and a Senator from 1963 to 1965.

A farmer and horse breeder, Donegan stood unsuccessfully as a Fianna Fáil candidate for Dáil Éireann in the Cork North constituency at the 1954 general election, before winning the seat at the 1957 general election. After boundary changes, he was defeated in the new Cork North-East constituency at the 1961 general election, and although he stood again in 1969 in Cork Mid, he never returned to the Dáil.

After the loss of his Dáil seat in 1961, Donegan was elected to the 10th Seanad in a by-election on the Agricultural Panel on 28 November 1963, but was defeated at the 1965 election to the 11th Seanad.

Dáil	Election	Deputy (Party)	Deputy (Party)	Deputy (Party)	Deputy (Party)
4th	1923	Daniel Corkery (Rep)	Daniel Vaughan (FP)	Thomas Nagle (Lab)	3 seats 1923–1937
5th	1927 (Jun)	Daniel Corkery (Ind.)	Daniel Vaughan (FP)	Timothy Quill (Lab)	3 seats 1923–1937
6th	1927 (Sep)	Daniel Corkery (FF)	Daniel Vaughan (FP)	Daniel O'Leary (CnaG)	3 seats 1923–1937
7th	1932	Seán Moylan (FF)	Daniel Vaughan (FP)	Daniel O'Leary (CnaG)	3 seats 1923–1937
8th	1933	Seán Moylan (FF)	Daniel Corkery (FF)	Daniel O'Leary (CnaG)	3 seats 1923–1937
9th	1937	Seán Moylan (FF)	Patrick Daly (FG)	Timothy Linehan (FG)	Con Meaney (FF)
10th	1938	Seán Moylan (FF)	Patrick Daly (FG)	Timothy Linehan (FG)	Con Meaney (FF)
11th	1943	Seán Moylan (FF)	Patrick Halliden (CnaT)	Timothy Linehan (FG)	Leo Skinner (FF)
12th	1944	Seán Moylan (FF)	Patrick Halliden (CnaT)	Patrick McAuliffe (Lab)	Leo Skinner (FF)
13th	1948	Seán Moylan (FF)	Patrick Halliden (CnaT)	Patrick McAuliffe (Lab)	3 seats 1948–1961
14th	1951	Seán Moylan (FF)	Denis O'Sullivan (FG)	Patrick McAuliffe (Lab)	3 seats 1948–1961
15th	1954	Seán Moylan (FF)	Denis O'Sullivan (FG)	Patrick McAuliffe (Lab)	3 seats 1948–1961
16th	1957	Batt Donegan (FF)	Denis O'Sullivan (FG)	Patrick McAuliffe (Lab)	3 seats 1948–1961
17th	1961	Constituency abolished. See Cork North-East and Cork Mid			
