= Cork North (Dáil constituency) =

Dáil constituency (1923–1961)

- Former Dáil constituency

Former constituency
- Created: 1923
- Abolished: 1961
- Seats: 3 (1923–1937); 4 (1937–1948); 3 (1948–1961)
- Local government area: County Cork
- Created from: Cork Mid, North, South, South East and West
- Replaced by: Cork Mid; Cork North-East

Cork North was a parliamentary constituency represented in Dáil Éireann, the lower house of the Irish parliament or Oireachtas from 1923 to 1961. The constituency elected 3 (and sometimes 4) deputies (Teachtaí Dála, commonly known as TDs) to the Dáil, on the system of proportional representation by means of the single transferable vote (PR-STV).

== History ==
The constituency was created under the Electoral Act 1923, for the 1923 general election to Dáil Éireann, whose members formed the 4th Dáil. The constituency returned 3 Teachtaí Dála initially. The number of seats was increased to 4 for the 1937 general election but was reduced back to 3 for the 1948 general election.

It succeeded the constituency of Cork Mid, North, South, South East and West. It was abolished under the Electoral (Amendment) Act 1961, when it was replaced by the new constituency of Cork North-East and Cork Mid.

== Boundaries ==
It consisted of the county electoral areas of Kanturk and Macroom in the administrative county of Cork.

== TDs ==
Teachtaí Dála (TDs) for Cork North 1923–1961
Key to parties: CnaT = Clann na Talmhan; CnaG = Cumann na nGaedheal; FP = Farmers' Party; FF = Fianna Fáil; FG = Fine Gael; Ind = Independent; Lab = Labour; Rep = Republican
Dáil	Election	Deputy (Party)	Deputy (Party)	Deputy (Party)	Deputy (Party)
4th	1923	Daniel Corkery (Rep)	Daniel Vaughan (FP)	Thomas Nagle (Lab)	3 seats 1923–1937
5th	1927 (Jun)	Daniel Corkery (Ind)	Daniel Vaughan (FP)	Timothy Quill (Lab)	3 seats 1923–1937
6th	1927 (Sep)	Daniel Corkery (FF)	Daniel Vaughan (FP)	Daniel O'Leary (CnaG)	3 seats 1923–1937
7th	1932	Seán Moylan (FF)	Daniel Vaughan (FP)	Daniel O'Leary (CnaG)	3 seats 1923–1937
8th	1933	Seán Moylan (FF)	Daniel Corkery (FF)	Daniel O'Leary (CnaG)	3 seats 1923–1937
9th	1937	Seán Moylan (FF)	Patrick Daly (FG)	Timothy Linehan (FG)	Con Meaney (FF)
10th	1938	Seán Moylan (FF)	Patrick Daly (FG)	Timothy Linehan (FG)	Con Meaney (FF)
11th	1943	Seán Moylan (FF)	Patrick Halliden (CnaT)	Timothy Linehan (FG)	Leo Skinner (FF)
12th	1944	Seán Moylan (FF)	Patrick Halliden (CnaT)	Patrick McAuliffe (Lab)	Leo Skinner (FF)
13th	1948	Seán Moylan (FF)	Patrick Halliden (CnaT)	Patrick McAuliffe (Lab)	3 seats 1948–1961
14th	1951	Seán Moylan (FF)	Denis O'Sullivan (FG)	Patrick McAuliffe (Lab)	3 seats 1948–1961
15th	1954	Seán Moylan (FF)	Denis O'Sullivan (FG)	Patrick McAuliffe (Lab)	3 seats 1948–1961
16th	1957	Batt Donegan (FF)	Denis O'Sullivan (FG)	Patrick McAuliffe (Lab)	3 seats 1948–1961
17th	1961	Constituency abolished. See Cork North-East and Cork Mid			

Note: The columns in this table are used only for presentational purposes, and no significance should be attached to the order of columns. For details of the order in which seats were won at each election, see the detailed results of that election.

== Elections ==
*: Outgoing TD

=== 1957 general election ===
1957 general election: Cork North
Party	Candidate	FPv%	Count	
Party	Candidate	FPv%	1	2
Fine Gael	Denis J. O'Sullivan	28.6	7,911	
Labour	Patrick McAuliffe	24.9	6,887	7,688
Fianna Fáil	Batt Donegan	24.9	6,865	6,971
Fianna Fáil	Seán Moylan	21.6	5,960	6,058
Electorate: 35,117 Valid: 27,623 Quota: 6,906 Turnout: 78.7%

=== 1954 general election ===
1954 general election: Cork North
Party	Candidate	FPv%	Count	
Party	Candidate	FPv%	1	2
Fianna Fáil	Seán Moylan	25.3	7,461	
Fine Gael	Denis J. O'Sullivan	24.9	7,355	9,385
Labour	Patrick McAuliffe	24.5	7,243	7,597
Fianna Fáil	Batt Donegan	14.4	4,241	4,797
Independent	William Biggane	10.9	3,232	
Electorate: 35,577 Valid: 29,532 Quota: 7,384 Turnout: 83.0%

=== 1951 general election ===
1951 general election: Cork North
Party	Candidate	FPv%	Count			
Party	Candidate	FPv%	1	2	3	4
Fine Gael	Denis J. O'Sullivan	25.9	7,824			
Labour	Patrick McAuliffe	21.9	6,617	6,729	7,579	
Fianna Fáil	Seán Moylan	17.4	5,269	5,276	5,422	7,640
Fianna Fáil	Con Meaney	14.5	4,381	4,398	4,792	6,085
Fianna Fáil	Cornelius O'Callaghan	12.7	3,853	3,867	4,300	
Independent	Garrett Barrett	7.6	2,291	2,406		
Electorate: 36,120 Valid: 30,235 Quota: 7,559 Turnout: 83.71%

=== 1948 general election ===
1948 general election: Cork North
Party	Candidate	FPv%	Count				
Party	Candidate	FPv%	1	2	3	4	5
Fianna Fáil	Seán Moylan	25.6	7,624				
Labour	Patrick McAuliffe	22.3	6,634	6,655	7,403	8,471	
Clann na Talmhan	Patrick Halliden	16.3	4,851	4,857	5,133	5,845	5,998
Fine Gael	Denis J. O'Sullivan	15.9	4,741	4,746	5,053	5,578	5,678
Fianna Fáil	Con Meaney	13.8	4,118	4,250	4,405		
Clann na Poblachta	John B. Sullivan	5.1	1,520	1,523			
Clann na Poblachta	William C. Toomey	1.1	333	334			
Electorate: 37,288 Valid: 29,821 Quota: 7,456 Turnout: 79.97%

=== 1944 general election ===
1944 general election: Cork North
Party	Candidate	FPv%	Count				
Party	Candidate	FPv%	1	2	3	4	5
Fianna Fáil	Seán Moylan	18.9	7,030	7,097	10,099		
Labour	Patrick McAuliffe	17.9	6,659	7,035	7,308	7,326	7,463
Clann na Talmhan	Patrick Halliden	17.9	6,648	7,706			
Fianna Fáil	Leo Skinner	13.7	5,108	5,355	5,762	5,781	8,247
Fianna Fáil	Con Meaney	11.0	4,081	4,146			
Fine Gael	Timothy Linehan	10.6	3,938	5,687	6,005	6,237	6,296
Fine Gael	Patrick Daly	10.0	3,719				
Electorate: 49,205 Valid: 37,183 Quota: 7,437 Turnout: 75.6%

=== 1943 general election ===
1943 general election: Cork North
Party	Candidate	FPv%	Count					
Party	Candidate	FPv%	1	2	3	4	5	6
Fianna Fáil	Seán Moylan	16.4	6,456	6,642	6,942	9,824		
Clann na Talmhan	Patrick Halliden	15.4	6,079	6,403	6,503	6,730	6,790	7,644
Fine Gael	Timothy Linehan	12.1	4,758	5,008	5,145	5,379	5,423	7,917
Fianna Fáil	Leo Skinner	10.6	4,187	4,822	4,947	5,254	7,004	7,328
Labour	Patrick McAuliffe	10.3	4,068	4,264	6,734	6,949	7,028	7,244
Fianna Fáil	Con Meaney	9.6	3,769	3,893	3,994			
Fine Gael	Patrick Daly	9.0	3,545	4,379	4,699	4,728	4,736	
Labour	John Crotty	8.4	3,324	3,740				
Independent	Seán Keane, Snr	7.3	2,893					
Independent	David Forde	0.8	331					
Electorate: 49,205 Valid: 39,410 Quota: 7,883 Turnout: 80.1%

=== 1938 general election ===
1938 general election: Cork North
Party	Candidate	FPv%	Count			
Party	Candidate	FPv%	1	2	3	4
Fianna Fáil	Seán Moylan	25.7	10,070			
Fine Gael	Timothy Linehan	20.2	7,920			
Fine Gael	Patrick Daly	20.0	7,845	7,901		
Labour	Timothy Quill	12.6	4,950	5,095	5,158	5,441
Fianna Fáil	William Griffin	11.9	4,658	5,037	5,039	
Fianna Fáil	Con Meaney	9.7	3,794	5,436	5,443	9,819
Electorate: 47,221 Valid: 39,237 Quota: 7,848 Turnout: 83.1%

=== 1937 general election ===
1937 general election: Cork North
Party	Candidate	FPv%	Count					
Party	Candidate	FPv%	1	2	3	4	5	6
Fine Gael	Timothy Linehan	20.3	7,953					
Fianna Fáil	Seán Moylan	19.6	7,649	7,652	7,701	7,743	10,391	
Fine Gael	Patrick Daly	15.4	6,023	6,130	9,441			
Labour	Timothy Quill	14.9	5,824	5,828	6,007	6,634	6,983	7,092
Fianna Fáil	Con Meaney	10.3	4,024	4,029	4,065	4,133	4,842	7,281
Fianna Fáil	Patrick Murphy	9.9	3,854	3,854	3,868	3,896		
Independent	Edward Cronin	9.6	3,762	3,778				
Electorate: 47,822 Valid: 39,089 Quota: 7,818 Turnout: 81.7%

=== 1933 general election ===
1933 general election: Cork North
Party	Candidate	FPv%	Count			
Party	Candidate	FPv%	1	2	3	4
Cumann na nGaedheal	Daniel O'Leary	25.1	7,736			
Fianna Fáil	Seán Moylan	24.3	7,463	7,464	7,571	7,925
Fianna Fáil	Daniel Corkery	23.1	7,093	7,095	7,277	7,641
National Centre Party	Daniel Vaughan	22.1	6,799	6,838	6,912	7,161
Labour	Daniel Hinchin	3.3	1,029	1,030	1,264	
Labour	Dominick O'Sullivan	2.1	645	646		
Electorate: 35,973 Valid: 30,765 Quota: 7,692 Turnout: 85.5%

=== 1932 general election ===
1932 general election: Cork North
Party	Candidate	FPv%	Count	
Party	Candidate	FPv%	1	2
Farmers' Party	Daniel Vaughan	22.9	6,408	6,931
Fianna Fáil	Seán Moylan	22.3	6,238	7,278
Cumann na nGaedheal	Daniel O'Leary	22.0	6,133	6,947
Fianna Fáil	Daniel Corkery	19.0	5,314	6,454
Labour	Daniel Hinchin	13.8	3,854	
Electorate: 34,720 Valid: 27,947 Quota: 6,987 Turnout: 80.5%

=== September 1927 general election ===
September 1927 general election: Cork North
Party	Candidate	FPv%	Count			
Party	Candidate	FPv%	1	2	3	4
Fianna Fáil	Daniel Corkery	30.2	7,800			
Cumann na nGaedheal	Daniel O'Leary	27.4	7,074			
Farmers' Party	Daniel Vaughan	20.0	5,147	5,281	5,799	6,193
Labour	Timothy Quill	16.0	4,123	5,052	5,133	6,074
Independent	Daniel Hinchin	6.4	1,642	1,932	1,960	
Electorate: 35,492 Valid: 25,786 Quota: 6,447 Turnout: 72.7%

=== June 1927 general election ===
June 1927 general election: Cork North
Party	Candidate	FPv%	Count			
Party	Candidate	FPv%	1	2	3	4
Independent	Daniel Corkery	24.0	5,602	5,661	6,046	
Labour	Timothy Quill	17.9	4,165	4,558	4,702	6,041
Farmers' Party	Daniel Vaughan	17.6	4,099	4,923	5,640	6,223
Independent	Daniel Hinchin	11.3	2,627	2,785	3,046	
Farmers' Party	Daniel Forde	11.0	2,575	2,998	3,318	3,425
Independent	Michael Barry	9.1	2,131	2,285		
Cumann na nGaedheal	John Cronin	9.0	2,106			
Electorate: 35,492 Valid: 23,305 Quota: 5,827 Turnout: 65.7%

=== 1923 general election ===
Figures from the second count are not available.

1923 general election: Cork North
Party	Candidate	FPv%	Count		
Party	Candidate	FPv%	1	2	3
Republican	Daniel Corkery	30.7	6,290		
Farmers' Party	Daniel Vaughan	21.0	4,299	N/A	5,206
Labour	Thomas Nagle	18.1	3,716	N/A	5,224
Farmers' Party	Edward Neville	16.5	3,385	N/A	4,701
Cumann na nGaedheal	John Lynch	13.6	2,792	N/A	
Electorate: 37,100 Valid: 20,482 Quota: 5,121 Turnout: 55.2%

== See also ==
- Dáil constituencies
- Politics of the Republic of Ireland
- Historic Dáil constituencies
- Elections in the Republic of Ireland
