= Patrick Halliden =

Irish politician

Teachta Dála
- In office June 1943 – May 1951
- Constituency: Cork North

Personal details
- Party: Clann na Talmhan

Patrick Joseph Halliden was an Irish Clann na Talmhan politician. A farmer and teacher by profession, he was first elected to Dáil Éireann as an Clann na Talmhan Teachta Dála (TD) for the Cork North constituency at the 1943 general election. He was re-elected at the 1944 and 1948 general elections. He did not contest the 1951 general election.

Dáil	Election	Deputy (Party)	Deputy (Party)	Deputy (Party)	Deputy (Party)
4th	1923	Daniel Corkery (Rep)	Daniel Vaughan (FP)	Thomas Nagle (Lab)	3 seats 1923–1937
5th	1927 (Jun)	Daniel Corkery (Ind.)	Daniel Vaughan (FP)	Timothy Quill (Lab)	3 seats 1923–1937
6th	1927 (Sep)	Daniel Corkery (FF)	Daniel Vaughan (FP)	Daniel O'Leary (CnaG)	3 seats 1923–1937
7th	1932	Seán Moylan (FF)	Daniel Vaughan (FP)	Daniel O'Leary (CnaG)	3 seats 1923–1937
8th	1933	Seán Moylan (FF)	Daniel Corkery (FF)	Daniel O'Leary (CnaG)	3 seats 1923–1937
9th	1937	Seán Moylan (FF)	Patrick Daly (FG)	Timothy Linehan (FG)	Con Meaney (FF)
10th	1938	Seán Moylan (FF)	Patrick Daly (FG)	Timothy Linehan (FG)	Con Meaney (FF)
11th	1943	Seán Moylan (FF)	Patrick Halliden (CnaT)	Timothy Linehan (FG)	Leo Skinner (FF)
12th	1944	Seán Moylan (FF)	Patrick Halliden (CnaT)	Patrick McAuliffe (Lab)	Leo Skinner (FF)
13th	1948	Seán Moylan (FF)	Patrick Halliden (CnaT)	Patrick McAuliffe (Lab)	3 seats 1948–1961
14th	1951	Seán Moylan (FF)	Denis O'Sullivan (FG)	Patrick McAuliffe (Lab)	3 seats 1948–1961
15th	1954	Seán Moylan (FF)	Denis O'Sullivan (FG)	Patrick McAuliffe (Lab)	3 seats 1948–1961
16th	1957	Batt Donegan (FF)	Denis O'Sullivan (FG)	Patrick McAuliffe (Lab)	3 seats 1948–1961
17th	1961	Constituency abolished. See Cork North-East and Cork Mid			
