= Dan Desmond =

Irish politician (1913–1964)

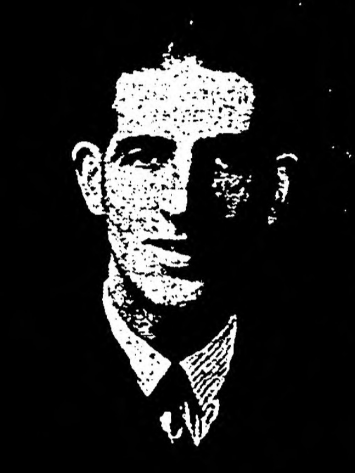
- Desmond in 1954

Teachta Dála
- In office October 1961 – 9 December 1964
- Constituency: Cork Mid
- In office February 1948 – October 1961
- Constituency: Cork South

Personal details
- Born: 3 October 1913 Crosshaven, County Cork, Ireland
- Died: 9 December 1964 (aged 51) Cork, Ireland
- Party: Labour Party
- Other political affiliations: Fianna Fáil
- Spouse: Eileen Harrington (m. 1956)
- Children: 2
- Education: Municipal College of Commerce, Cork

Daniel Desmond (3 October 1913 – 9 December 1964) was an Irish Labour Party politician and Teachta Dála (TD) for seventeen years.

== Early life ==
Desmond was born on 3 October 1913 in Crosshaven, County Cork, the second child of two sons and four daughters of Michael Desmond, carpenter, and his wife, Hanora White, both from County Cork. He was educated at the local national school and the Municipal College of Commerce, Cork.

According to historian John Horgan, he was Cork based trade unionist, and was a founder member of Fianna Fáil but broke from the party when they introduced the Wages Standstill Order in 1939. He later joined the Labour Party. However, according to the Dictionary of Irish Biography, while still at school he joined the local branch of the Labour Party and became its secretary at the age of 16. A builder's clerk, he became secretary of the Federation of Rural Workers in 1947 and was organiser at county level.

== Political career ==
Desmond first stood for election to Dáil Éireann at the 1944 general election in the Cork South-East constituency, where he was defeated, winning 5.4% of the first-preference votes. However, he was successful on his next time as a candidate: at the 1948 general election he was the first candidate to be elected in the new 3-seat Cork South constituency.

He took his seat in the 13th Dáil, and was re-elected at the 1951 general election and again in the 1954 and 1957 general elections, topping the poll again in 1951 and 1954. After further boundary changes, he was returned at the 1961 general election for the new 4-seat Cork Mid constituency.

He was the Labour Party's chief spokesman on local government, and also had strong views on social issues in parliament, in particular housing, health and education. He was principally responsible for the passing of the Local Government (Superannuation) Act 1956, providing a pension scheme for road workers. His abiding interest was the welfare of rural workers and the rural community generally. He was parliamentary leader of his party during the Second Inter-Party Government (1954–1957) and he later became deputy leader.

A member of Cork County Council from 1945 until his death, he served on many committees such as the vocational educational committee, Cork housing and sanitary services, Cork health authority (health board) and the assistance board. Despite ill health, he participated strongly and at great length in important Dáil debates, and continued his constituency duties.

== Family ==
He married Eileen Harrington, a civil servant, in 1956, and they had two daughters. Desmond died from a cardiac infarction caused by Tuberculosis on 9 December 1964 at St Stephen's Hospital, Cork. The by-election for his seat in the 17th Dáil was won on 10 March 1965 by his widow Eileen Desmond, who sat in the Oireachtas for 22 years.

His daughter, Paula Desmond, was a member of Cork County Council from 1985 to 2014. In 1996, as chairperson of Cork County Council, she opened a newly constructed bridge at Belgooly, County Cork, named after her father. Two housing estates in Carrigaline and Passage West were also named in his honour.

Dáil	Election	Deputy (Party)	Deputy (Party)	Deputy (Party)
13th	1948	Dan Desmond (Lab)	Seán Buckley (FF)	Patrick Lehane (CnaT)
14th	1951	Dan Desmond (Lab)	Seán Buckley (FF)	Patrick Lehane (Ind.)
15th	1954	Dan Desmond (Lab)	Seán McCarthy (FF)	Tadhg Manley (FG)
16th	1957	Dan Desmond (Lab)	Seán McCarthy (FF)	Tadhg Manley (FG)
17th	1961	Constituency abolished		

Dáil	Election	Deputy (Party)	Deputy (Party)	Deputy (Party)	Deputy (Party)	Deputy (Party)
17th	1961	Dan Desmond (Lab)	Seán McCarthy (FF)	Con Meaney (FF)	Denis J. O'Sullivan (FG)	4 seats 1961–1977
17th	1965 by-election	Eileen Desmond (Lab)	Seán McCarthy (FF)	Con Meaney (FF)	Denis J. O'Sullivan (FG)	4 seats 1961–1977
18th	1965	Eileen Desmond (Lab)	Flor Crowley (FF)	Thomas Meaney (FF)	Donal Creed (FG)	4 seats 1961–1977
19th	1969	Philip Burton (FG)	Paddy Forde (FF)	Thomas Meaney (FF)	Donal Creed (FG)	4 seats 1961–1977
19th	1972 by-election	Philip Burton (FG)	Gene Fitzgerald (FF)	Thomas Meaney (FF)	Donal Creed (FG)	4 seats 1961–1977
20th	1973	Eileen Desmond (Lab)	Gene Fitzgerald (FF)	Thomas Meaney (FF)	Donal Creed (FG)	4 seats 1961–1977
21st	1977	Eileen Desmond (Lab)	Gene Fitzgerald (FF)	Thomas Meaney (FF)	Donal Creed (FG)	Barry Cogan (FF)
22nd	1981	Constituency abolished. See Cork North-Central and Cork South-Central				
