= 1965 Cork Mid by-election =

By-election to the 17th Dáil

- 10 March 1965
- Turnout: 38,078 (75.8%)
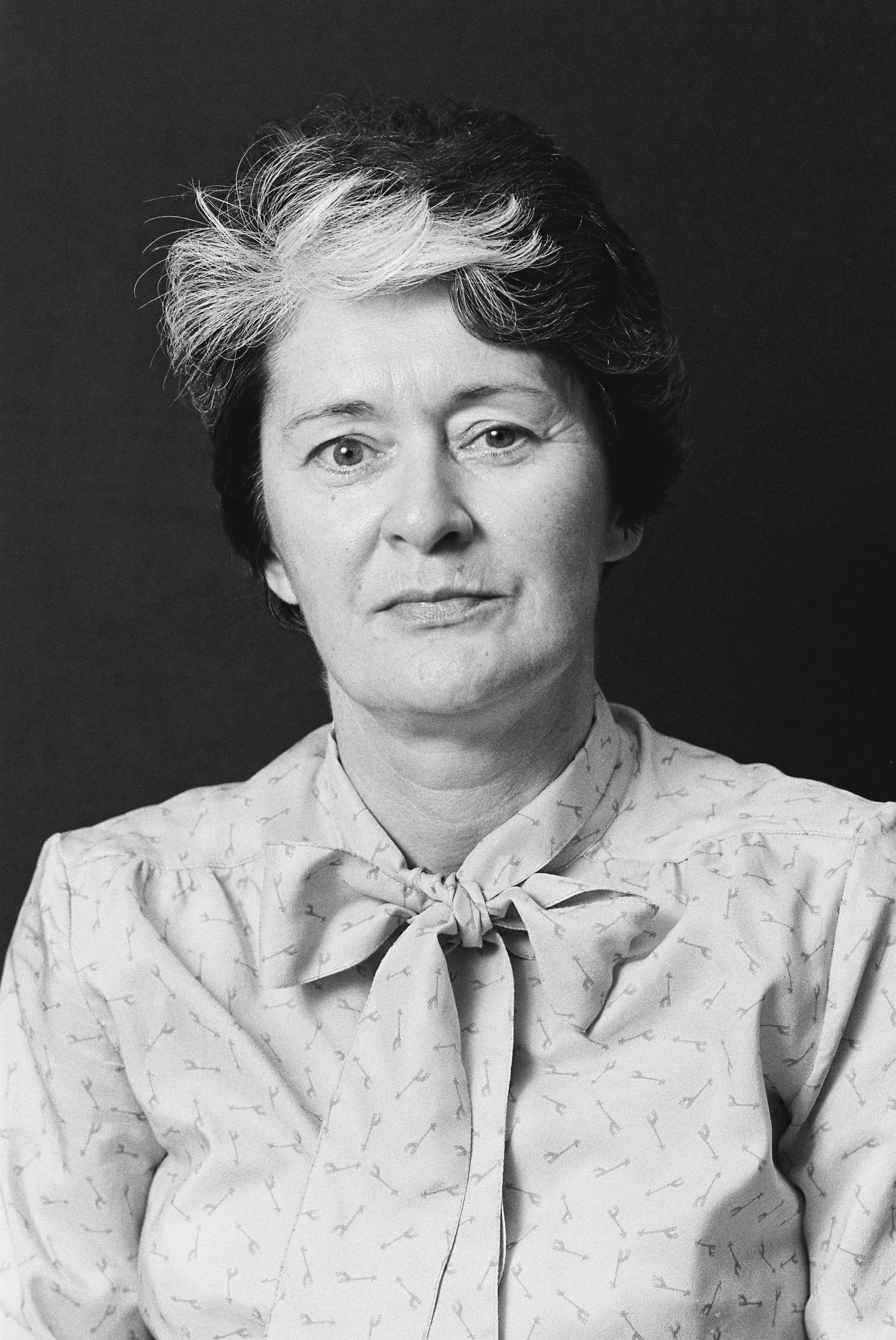

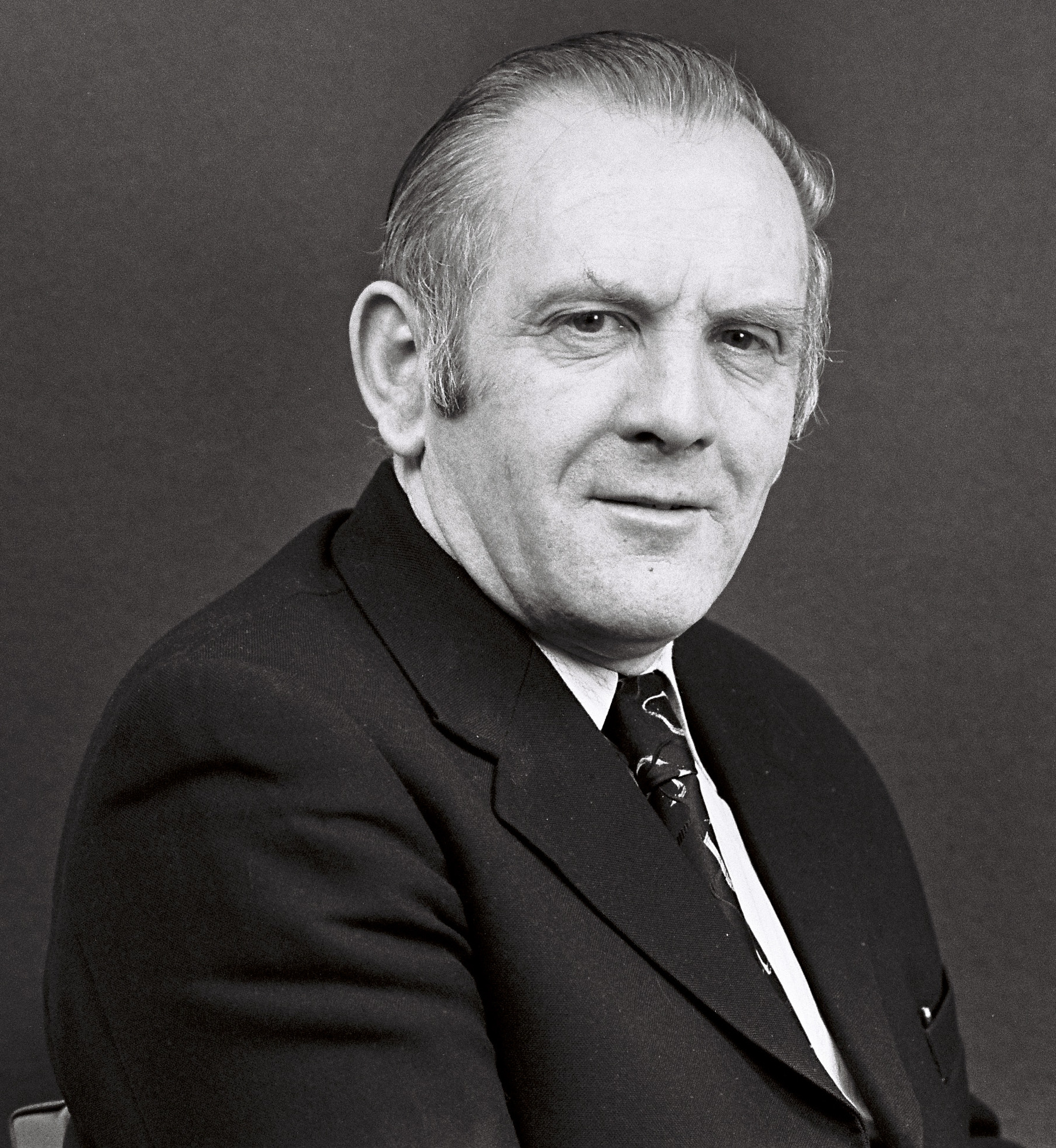
		Crowley
Nominee	Eileen Desmond	Flor Crowley	Donal Creed
Party	Labour	Fianna Fáil	Fine Gael
First preferences	12,752	13,779	4,849
Percentage	33.5%	36.2%	17.8%
Final count	20,756	15,093	–
TD before election
Dan Desmond
Labour
TD after election
Eileen Desmond
Labour

A Dáil by-election was held in the constituency of Cork Mid in Ireland on Wednesday, 10 March 1965, to fill a vacancy in the 17th Dáil. It followed the death of Labour Teachta Dála (TD) Dan Desmond on 9 December 1964.

The writ of election to fill the vacancy was agreed by the Dáil on 10 February 1965.

The by-election was won by the Labour candidate Eileen Desmond, widow of the deceased TD, Dan Desmond.

Her victory in the by-election led Taoiseach Seán Lemass to dissolve the 17th Dáil before she could assume her seat, and call a general election. Eileen Desmond was re-elected for Cork Mid at the 1965 general election.

== Result ==
1965 Cork Mid by-election
Party	Candidate	FPv%	Count		
Party	Candidate	FPv%	1	2	3
Fianna Fáil	Flor Crowley	36.2	13,779	13,932	15,093
Labour	Eileen Desmond	33.5	12,752	12,937	20,756
Fine Gael	Donal Creed	28.8	10,957	11,105	
Independent	Sylvester Cotter	1.6	590		
Electorate: 50,220 Valid: 38,078 Quota: 19,040 Turnout: 75.8%
