= Thomas Meaney =

Irish politician (1931–2022)

Minister of State
- 1980–1981: Industry, Commerce and Tourism

Teachta Dála
- In office June 1981 – November 1982
- Constituency: Cork North-West
- In office April 1965 – June 1981
- Constituency: Cork Mid

Personal details
- Born: 11 August 1931 Millstreet, County Cork, Ireland
- Died: 26 December 2022 (aged 91) Derrinagree, County Cork, Ireland
- Party: Fianna Fáil
- Spouse: Joan O'Donoghue (m. 1961; died 2021)
- Children: 6
- Parent: Con Meaney (father)

Thomas Meaney (11 August 1931 – 26 December 2022) was an Irish Fianna Fáil politician who served as a Minister of State from 1980 to 1981. He served as a Teachta Dála (TD) from 1965 to 1981.

Before entering politics Meaney worked as a farmer. His father Con Meaney was also a Fianna Fáil TD. When his father retired at the 1965 general election, Tom Meaney succeeded him as the Fianna Fáil TD for the Cork Mid constituency. He was re-elected at every subsequent general election until his retirement from politics at the November 1982 general election. In March 1980, he was appointed Minister of State at the Department of Industry, Commerce and Energy, serving until June 1981.

He was a member of Cork County Council from 1970 to 1977. He was part of a group of Fianna Fáil TDs known as the Gang of 22, who opposed the leadership of Charles Haughey in the early 1980s.

Meaney died on 26 December 2022, at the age of 91.

== See also ==
- Families in the Oireachtas

== Sources ==
- Nealon, Ted; Dunlop, Frank (1977). Ted Nealon's guide to the 21st Dáil and Seanad. ISBN 0950598410.
- Joyce, Joe; Murtagh, Peter (1983). The Boss.

Political offices
Preceded by Ray Burke	Minister of State at the Department of Industry, Commerce and Tourism; 1980–1981; With: Ray Burke (to October 1980); Denis Gallagher (Oct. 1980 to June 1981)	Succeeded by Michael Begley as Minister of State at the Department of Trade, Commerce and Tourism

Dáil	Election	Deputy (Party)	Deputy (Party)	Deputy (Party)	Deputy (Party)	Deputy (Party)
17th	1961	Dan Desmond (Lab)	Seán McCarthy (FF)	Con Meaney (FF)	Denis J. O'Sullivan (FG)	4 seats 1961–1977
17th	1965 by-election	Eileen Desmond (Lab)	Seán McCarthy (FF)	Con Meaney (FF)	Denis J. O'Sullivan (FG)	4 seats 1961–1977
18th	1965	Eileen Desmond (Lab)	Flor Crowley (FF)	Thomas Meaney (FF)	Donal Creed (FG)	4 seats 1961–1977
19th	1969	Philip Burton (FG)	Paddy Forde (FF)	Thomas Meaney (FF)	Donal Creed (FG)	4 seats 1961–1977
19th	1972 by-election	Philip Burton (FG)	Gene Fitzgerald (FF)	Thomas Meaney (FF)	Donal Creed (FG)	4 seats 1961–1977
20th	1973	Eileen Desmond (Lab)	Gene Fitzgerald (FF)	Thomas Meaney (FF)	Donal Creed (FG)	4 seats 1961–1977
21st	1977	Eileen Desmond (Lab)	Gene Fitzgerald (FF)	Thomas Meaney (FF)	Donal Creed (FG)	Barry Cogan (FF)
22nd	1981	Constituency abolished. See Cork North-Central and Cork South-Central				

Dáil	Election	Deputy (Party)	Deputy (Party)	Deputy (Party)
22nd	1981	Thomas Meaney (FF)	Frank Crowley (FG)	Donal Creed (FG)
23rd	1982 (Feb)	Thomas Meaney (FF)	Frank Crowley (FG)	Donal Creed (FG)
24th	1982 (Nov)	Donal Moynihan (FF)	Frank Crowley (FG)	Donal Creed (FG)
25th	1987	Donal Moynihan (FF)	Frank Crowley (FG)	Donal Creed (FG)
26th	1989	Laurence Kelly (FF)	Frank Crowley (FG)	Michael Creed (FG)
27th	1992	Donal Moynihan (FF)	Frank Crowley (FG)	Michael Creed (FG)
28th	1997	Donal Moynihan (FF)	Michael Moynihan (FF)	Michael Creed (FG)
29th	2002	Donal Moynihan (FF)	Michael Moynihan (FF)	Gerard Murphy (FG)
30th	2007	Batt O'Keeffe (FF)	Michael Moynihan (FF)	Michael Creed (FG)
31st	2011	Áine Collins (FG)	Michael Moynihan (FF)	Michael Creed (FG)
32nd	2016	Aindrias Moynihan (FF)	Michael Moynihan (FF)	Michael Creed (FG)
33rd	2020	Aindrias Moynihan (FF)	Michael Moynihan (FF)	Michael Creed (FG)
34th	2024	Aindrias Moynihan (FF)	Michael Moynihan (FF)	John Paul O'Shea (FG)
