= Patrick Daly =

Irish politician, vintner and farmer

Teachta Dála
- In office July 1937 – June 1943
- Constituency: Cork North
- In office January 1933 – July 1937
- Constituency: Cork East

Personal details
- Born: County Cork, Ireland
- Party: Fine Gael; Cumann na nGaedheal

Patrick Daly was an Irish politician, vintner and farmer. He was first elected to Dáil Éireann as a Cumann na nGaedheal Teachta Dála (TD) for the Cork East constituency at the 1933 general election. He was elected as a Fine Gael TD for the Cork North constituency at the 1937 and 1938 general elections. He lost his seat at the 1943 general election, and was an unsuccessful candidate at the 1944 general election.

Dáil	Election	Deputy (Party)	Deputy (Party)	Deputy (Party)	Deputy (Party)	Deputy (Party)
4th	1923	John Daly (Ind.)	Michael Hennessy (CnaG)	David Kent (Rep)	John Dinneen (FP)	Thomas O'Mahony (CnaG)
4th	1924 by-election	John Daly (Ind.)	Michael Hennessy (CnaG)	David Kent (Rep)	John Dinneen (FP)	Michael K. Noonan (CnaG)
5th	1927 (Jun)	John Daly (Ind.)	Michael Hennessy (CnaG)	David Kent (SF)	David O'Gorman (FP)	Martin Corry (FF)
6th	1927 (Sep)	John Daly (CnaG)	Michael Hennessy (CnaG)	William Kent (FF)	Edmond Carey (CnaG)	Martin Corry (FF)
7th	1932	John Daly (CnaG)	William Broderick (CnaG)	Brook Brasier (Ind.)	Patrick Murphy (FF)	Martin Corry (FF)
8th	1933	Patrick Daly (CnaG)	William Broderick (CnaG)	William Kent (NCP)	Patrick Murphy (FF)	Martin Corry (FF)
9th	1937	Constituency abolished				

Dáil	Election	Deputy (Party)	Deputy (Party)	Deputy (Party)
13th	1948	Martin Corry (FF)	Patrick O'Gorman (FG)	Seán Keane (Lab)
14th	1951	Martin Corry (FF)	Patrick O'Gorman (FG)	Seán Keane (Lab)
14th	1953 by-election	Martin Corry (FF)	Patrick O'Gorman (FG)	Richard Barry (FG)
15th	1954	Martin Corry (FF)	John Moher (FF)	Richard Barry (FG)
16th	1957	Martin Corry (FF)	John Moher (FF)	Richard Barry (FG)
17th	1961	Constituency abolished		

Dáil	Election	Deputy (Party)	Deputy (Party)	Deputy (Party)	Deputy (Party)
22nd	1981	Carey Joyce (FF)	Myra Barry (FG)	Patrick Hegarty (FG)	Joe Sherlock (SF–WP)
23rd	1982 (Feb)	Michael Ahern (FF)	Myra Barry (FG)	Patrick Hegarty (FG)	Joe Sherlock (SF–WP)
24th	1982 (Nov)	Michael Ahern (FF)	Myra Barry (FG)	Patrick Hegarty (FG)	Ned O'Keeffe (FF)
25th	1987	Michael Ahern (FF)	Joe Sherlock (WP)	Patrick Hegarty (FG)	Ned O'Keeffe (FF)
26th	1989	Michael Ahern (FF)	Joe Sherlock (WP)	Paul Bradford (FG)	Ned O'Keeffe (FF)
27th	1992	Michael Ahern (FF)	John Mulvihill (Lab)	Paul Bradford (FG)	Ned O'Keeffe (FF)
28th	1997	Michael Ahern (FF)	David Stanton (FG)	Paul Bradford (FG)	Ned O'Keeffe (FF)
29th	2002	Michael Ahern (FF)	David Stanton (FG)	Joe Sherlock (Lab)	Ned O'Keeffe (FF)
30th	2007	Michael Ahern (FF)	David Stanton (FG)	Seán Sherlock (Lab)	Ned O'Keeffe (FF)
31st	2011	Sandra McLellan (SF)	David Stanton (FG)	Seán Sherlock (Lab)	Tom Barry (FG)
32nd	2016	Pat Buckley (SF)	David Stanton (FG)	Seán Sherlock (Lab)	Kevin O'Keeffe (FF)
33rd	2020	Pat Buckley (SF)	David Stanton (FG)	Seán Sherlock (Lab)	James O'Connor (FF)
34th	2024	Pat Buckley (SF)	Noel McCarthy (FG)	Liam Quaide (SD)	James O'Connor (FF)

Dáil	Election	Deputy (Party)	Deputy (Party)	Deputy (Party)	Deputy (Party)
4th	1923	Daniel Corkery (Rep)	Daniel Vaughan (FP)	Thomas Nagle (Lab)	3 seats 1923–1937
5th	1927 (Jun)	Daniel Corkery (Ind.)	Daniel Vaughan (FP)	Timothy Quill (Lab)	3 seats 1923–1937
6th	1927 (Sep)	Daniel Corkery (FF)	Daniel Vaughan (FP)	Daniel O'Leary (CnaG)	3 seats 1923–1937
7th	1932	Seán Moylan (FF)	Daniel Vaughan (FP)	Daniel O'Leary (CnaG)	3 seats 1923–1937
8th	1933	Seán Moylan (FF)	Daniel Corkery (FF)	Daniel O'Leary (CnaG)	3 seats 1923–1937
9th	1937	Seán Moylan (FF)	Patrick Daly (FG)	Timothy Linehan (FG)	Con Meaney (FF)
10th	1938	Seán Moylan (FF)	Patrick Daly (FG)	Timothy Linehan (FG)	Con Meaney (FF)
11th	1943	Seán Moylan (FF)	Patrick Halliden (CnaT)	Timothy Linehan (FG)	Leo Skinner (FF)
12th	1944	Seán Moylan (FF)	Patrick Halliden (CnaT)	Patrick McAuliffe (Lab)	Leo Skinner (FF)
13th	1948	Seán Moylan (FF)	Patrick Halliden (CnaT)	Patrick McAuliffe (Lab)	3 seats 1948–1961
14th	1951	Seán Moylan (FF)	Denis O'Sullivan (FG)	Patrick McAuliffe (Lab)	3 seats 1948–1961
15th	1954	Seán Moylan (FF)	Denis O'Sullivan (FG)	Patrick McAuliffe (Lab)	3 seats 1948–1961
16th	1957	Batt Donegan (FF)	Denis O'Sullivan (FG)	Patrick McAuliffe (Lab)	3 seats 1948–1961
17th	1961	Constituency abolished. See Cork North-East and Cork Mid			
