= James John Skinner =

Zambian politician

Skinner as Chief Justice of Malawi, late 1970s

James John Skinner (24 July 1923 – 21 October 2008) was an Irish-born Zambian politician and jurist. He was the first Minister of Justice of independent Zambia and the only White member of Zambia's first cabinet. Following his time as a Zambian jurist, Skinner moved to neighbouring Malawi, where he was Chief Justice of Malawi from 1970 to 1985. His final judicial appointment was as a Social Security Commissioner in England from 1986 to 1996.

== Family ==
Skinner came from a family steeped in the law. His grandfather, James G. Skinner, was a solicitor in Mitchelstown, County Cork. His father William Skinner was also a solicitor and was appointed the County Registrar for Tipperary. His uncle, Leo Skinner, a solicitor, was also an Irish Fianna Fáil politician and was elected (1943 and 1944) to Dáil Éireann as a TD for the Cork North constituency and was appointed a District Court judge in 1966. His cousin, Geraldine Skinner, a barrister, became the legal adviser in the Department of Foreign Affairs in Dublin and subsequently the Irish Ambassador to Luxembourg.

== Early life ==
Skinner was born in July 1923 in Clonmel, Irish Free State, to WJ Skinner, and Kathleen O'Donnell. He attended Clongowes Wood College prior to attending Trinity College Dublin. Following studying at Trinity College, Skinner was called to the King's Inns in 1946 and to the English Bar at Gray's Inn in 1950. He practised in the Leinster Circuit from 1946 to 1951.

== Emigration to Northern Rhodesia and entrance to politics ==
In 1951, Skinner emigrated to Northern Rhodesia. He was called to the Bar of Northern Rhodesia in 1951. A defender of African rights, Skinner joined the mainly African United National Independence Party (UNIP) in 1960 and quickly became the party's legal advisor. Ostracized by most White residents of the colony, Skinner lost in his bid for a seat in the pre-independence parliament in the 1962 general election. Two years later in the first election following independence, he was elected to represent a constituency of Lusaka. He was appointed Queen's Counsel in Northern Rhodesia on 9 September 1964. In 1965, he was honoured with the Grand Commander of Order of Menelik II award from Ethiopia, recognising his contributions to Zambia's independence. Skinner was a member of the first cabinet and the Attorney General of Zambia from independence until 1967, when he was appointed Justice Minister. In March 1969, he was appointed Chief Justice of Zambia.

== Resignation ==
Skinner did not last long in his position as Chief Justice in Zambia. He resigned six months later in September 1969 following a clash with President Kenneth Kaunda over the sentencing of Portuguese soldiers from neighbouring Angola. The soldiers were caught on the Zambian side of the Angolan-Zambian border and were arrested. A fellow expatriate jurist, Ifor Evan, concluded the original arrest of the soldiers was "trivial" and dismissed the charges. When the issue was appealed to Skinner, he upheld Evan’s judgment. Kaunda, a long time friend of Skinner, attacked the White-dominated court for siding with the soldiers. Supporters of Kaunda stormed the court building following the ruling, attacking the Whites inside. Kaunda quickly apologised, but Evan and Skinner fled the country, with Skinner going on "indefinite sick leave". A month later, he was replaced on the court by Brian Doyle, a fellow White Zambian.

== Malawi, judicial appointment in England and return to Ireland ==
Skinner became the Chief Justice of Malawi in 1970 under Hastings Banda, lasting in that position until 1985. In that year, Skinner returned to England, where he was appointed a Social Security and Child Support Commissioner by the Lord Chancellor. The work involved the determination of complex appeals on points of law often by unrepresented and disadvantaged claimants. He was adept in giving written judgments which were clear in law but in simple language that could be understood by claimants. He retired at the statutory retirement age for judges (72) and spent his remaining years with his wife and five children. He died in October 2008 at the age of 85 and his ashes were finally buried in Clonmel in Ireland, the country of his birth.

== Quotations ==
"I had not liked the social or racial atmosphere of the [colonial] time and reacted against it."

"...such independence [of the judiciary] implies freedom from interference by the Executive or Legislative with the exercise of the judicial function, but it does not mean that the judge is entitled to act in an arbitrary manner."

"The people must know that when they go to court they will receive justice, and that all citizens are equal before the Courts regardless of their tribe, race or political opinions."

"It would be a sad day for Zambia if legal representation were denied to any member of the community. Anyone in the state who tried to stop free or effective representation would be striking a blow against social progress and orderly society, for the law is the instrument which ensures the attainment of both."

"The constitution of the Republic provides that every person charged with a criminal offence shall be permitted to defend himself before the court in person, or at his own expense, by a legal representative of his own choice. The right which is guaranteed in our fundamental law has for a long time been recognized to be of great importance to the maintenance of the freedom of the individual in many countries having a similar jurisprudence to our own."

"…I never regarded the judiciary as a caste apart; its members must share the hopes and aspirations of the nation. However, this does not mean that judges should decide cases or impose sentences in such a way as to please public opinion or the Government. They must decide them in accordance with the facts before them and the law. It is only in this manner that an accused person can be guaranteed a fair and impartial trial before an unbiased judge free from the domination of public opinion…."

"…It is one of the functions of the judiciary to criticize the actions of the Executive or its individual servants when the need arises. If that right is to be denied then the courts can no longer effectively carry out their duties."

"Confidence in the Judiciary is a delicate bloom in Africa and I am not going to risk destroying its growth in Zambia."
