= Denis J. O'Sullivan =

Irish politician (1918–1987)

Senator
- In office 23 June 1965 – 5 November 1969
- Constituency: Industrial and Commercial Panel

Parliamentary Secretary
- 1954–1957: Government Chief Whip
- 1954–1957: Defence

Teachta Dála
- In office October 1961 – April 1965
- Constituency: Cork Mid
- In office May 1951 – October 1961
- Constituency: Cork North

Personal details
- Born: 5 March 1918 County Cork, Ireland
- Died: 20 July 1987 (aged 69) County Cork, Ireland
- Party: Fine Gael

Denis James O'Sullivan (5 March 1918 – 20 July 1987) was an Irish Fine Gael politician. He was first elected to Dáil Éireann at his second attempt at the 1951 general election. He served as a Fine Gael Teachta Dála (TD) for various Cork constituencies until losing his seat at the 1965 general election.

He served in the Second Inter-Party Government of John A. Costello as Government Chief Whip. He was a member of Seanad Éireann from 1965 to 1969.

Political offices
Preceded by Donnchadh Ó Briain	Government Chief Whip; 1954–1957	Succeeded by Donnchadh Ó Briain
Preceded by Donnchadh Ó Briain	Parliamentary Secretary to the Minister for Defence; 1954–1957	Succeeded by Donnchadh Ó Briain

Dáil	Election	Deputy (Party)	Deputy (Party)	Deputy (Party)	Deputy (Party)
4th	1923	Daniel Corkery (Rep)	Daniel Vaughan (FP)	Thomas Nagle (Lab)	3 seats 1923–1937
5th	1927 (Jun)	Daniel Corkery (Ind.)	Daniel Vaughan (FP)	Timothy Quill (Lab)	3 seats 1923–1937
6th	1927 (Sep)	Daniel Corkery (FF)	Daniel Vaughan (FP)	Daniel O'Leary (CnaG)	3 seats 1923–1937
7th	1932	Seán Moylan (FF)	Daniel Vaughan (FP)	Daniel O'Leary (CnaG)	3 seats 1923–1937
8th	1933	Seán Moylan (FF)	Daniel Corkery (FF)	Daniel O'Leary (CnaG)	3 seats 1923–1937
9th	1937	Seán Moylan (FF)	Patrick Daly (FG)	Timothy Linehan (FG)	Con Meaney (FF)
10th	1938	Seán Moylan (FF)	Patrick Daly (FG)	Timothy Linehan (FG)	Con Meaney (FF)
11th	1943	Seán Moylan (FF)	Patrick Halliden (CnaT)	Timothy Linehan (FG)	Leo Skinner (FF)
12th	1944	Seán Moylan (FF)	Patrick Halliden (CnaT)	Patrick McAuliffe (Lab)	Leo Skinner (FF)
13th	1948	Seán Moylan (FF)	Patrick Halliden (CnaT)	Patrick McAuliffe (Lab)	3 seats 1948–1961
14th	1951	Seán Moylan (FF)	Denis O'Sullivan (FG)	Patrick McAuliffe (Lab)	3 seats 1948–1961
15th	1954	Seán Moylan (FF)	Denis O'Sullivan (FG)	Patrick McAuliffe (Lab)	3 seats 1948–1961
16th	1957	Batt Donegan (FF)	Denis O'Sullivan (FG)	Patrick McAuliffe (Lab)	3 seats 1948–1961
17th	1961	Constituency abolished. See Cork North-East and Cork Mid			

Dáil	Election	Deputy (Party)	Deputy (Party)	Deputy (Party)	Deputy (Party)	Deputy (Party)
17th	1961	Dan Desmond (Lab)	Seán McCarthy (FF)	Con Meaney (FF)	Denis J. O'Sullivan (FG)	4 seats 1961–1977
17th	1965 by-election	Eileen Desmond (Lab)	Seán McCarthy (FF)	Con Meaney (FF)	Denis J. O'Sullivan (FG)	4 seats 1961–1977
18th	1965	Eileen Desmond (Lab)	Flor Crowley (FF)	Thomas Meaney (FF)	Donal Creed (FG)	4 seats 1961–1977
19th	1969	Philip Burton (FG)	Paddy Forde (FF)	Thomas Meaney (FF)	Donal Creed (FG)	4 seats 1961–1977
19th	1972 by-election	Philip Burton (FG)	Gene Fitzgerald (FF)	Thomas Meaney (FF)	Donal Creed (FG)	4 seats 1961–1977
20th	1973	Eileen Desmond (Lab)	Gene Fitzgerald (FF)	Thomas Meaney (FF)	Donal Creed (FG)	4 seats 1961–1977
21st	1977	Eileen Desmond (Lab)	Gene Fitzgerald (FF)	Thomas Meaney (FF)	Donal Creed (FG)	Barry Cogan (FF)
22nd	1981	Constituency abolished. See Cork North-Central and Cork South-Central				
