= Timothy Quill =

Irish politician (1901–1960)

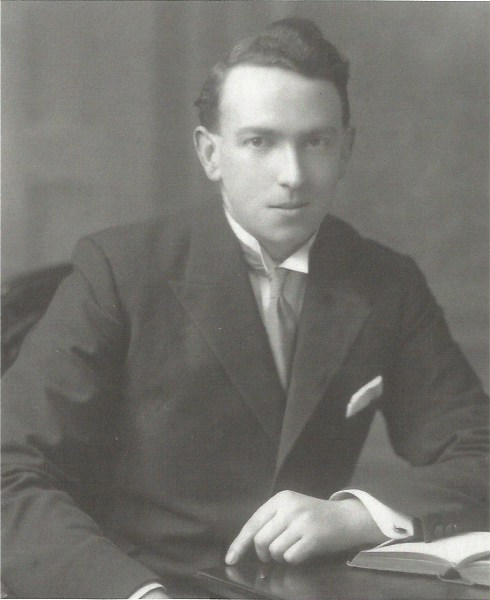
- Quill in 1930

Teachta Dála
- In office June 1927 – September 1927
- Constituency: Cork North

Cork City Councillor
- In office 1936–1945

Cork County Councillor
- In office 1925–1934
- In office 1942–1945

Personal details
- Born: 9 May 1901 Clondrohid, Macroom, County Cork, Ireland
- Died: 10 June 1960 (aged 59) Blarney, County Cork, Ireland
- Resting place: St. Finbarr's Cemetery, Cork
- Party: Labour Party
- Spouse: Mary McCarthy
- Occupation: Co-operator, agriculturalist

Timothy Quill (9 May 1901 – 10 June 1960) was an Irish Labour Party politician, farmer and a figure in the history of the cooperative movement in Ireland. He was a founder of the City of Cork Co-operative Society (also serving as the society's secretary), and was the editor of The Cork Co-Operator publication. He was also manager and secretary of the Cork Co-operative Bakery Society. He was an organiser for the Labour Party in Cork, a regional trade union secretary and one of a number of early Labour Dáil members to promote Christian socialism. Quill also served as a local councillor initially with Cork County Council from 1925 but served on both the County Council and Cork Corporation during the 1930s and 1940s.

== Early life ==
Timothy Quill was born to Daniel and Mary Quill in Clondrohid, Macroom, County Cork, on 9 May 1901. He had five siblings in total, all brothers. Initially living in Macroom, he moved to Cork City with his wife and young family, and in 1936 was living near Victoria Cross. Before his time in the co-operative movement, he was involved in the insurance business.

== Politician ==
=== Trade unionist ===
Quill was a regional trade union secretary for North-West Cork. Quill, along with TJ Murphy and Paddy Crowley MCC, have been credited with establishing "labourers' clubs" in County Cork during the 1920s and 1930s. The clubs would meet after Mass and some were supported by parish priests. The clubs began to go into decline in the 1940s as farm machinery became more commonplace.

=== June 1927 general election ===
Quill was a councillor on Cork County Council at the time, having been elected in 1925. It has been said that he was recruited into the party by Labour politician and fellow Clondrohid native T. J. Murphy.

Quill was 26 years old at the time of the general election on 9 June 1927 and was one of 44 Labour candidates in total. While campaigning, Quill described himself as a "temperate man". In June 1927, at a meeting in North Cork, Quill outlined what he believed the Labour Party stood for. Referring to the level of unemployment, he spoke about the "right to work" and the government's perceived failing of "humbler people" over the "well-to-do class".

Quill was elected as a Labour Party TD for the Cork North constituency at the June 1927 general election, receiving 18% of first preference votes. Slogans, such as 'Be Labour This Time' and 'Away With Slums & Mud Cabins' were featured on his election posters. He was the youngest member of the 5th Dail.

He spoke against the Public Safety Bill 1927 in August 1927. During a finance committee debate on old age pensions in July 1927, he decried what he described as the "strict and harsh manner" of some pensions officers.

=== September 1927 general election ===
Quill lost his seat at the September 1927 general election, serving only three months as a TD. He received 4,123 first preference votes. T. D. Keating of the ITGWU said that it was regrettable that Quill was not re-elected. The number of Labour candidates almost halved (from 44 to 28). Speaking on the heavy defeat for Labour in the September 1927 election, T. J. Murphy regretted that the party had lost candidates, like Quill, who he described as "young men of the ability and honesty of Mr. Quill, who had been defeated in North Cork by a mere handful of votes, after making a marvellous fight against a combination of influences".

=== 1930s general elections ===
Quill did not contest the 1932 general election, declining to stand at a convention in Millstreet, Cork. According to The Southern Star, it was thought Quill would be the chosen candidate, but, according to the newspaper's columnist, had "to a certain extent, lost touch with the electors of this division and he declined to accept the honour". According to the Cork Examiner, having been proposed and seconded, Quill declined the nomination and asked "that some other candidate […] be proposed". In a letter published in The Southern Star in June 1933, Quill labelled criticisms leveled against him and the Labour movement as 'ignorant'. As of 1936, he was Chairman of the Cork County Executive of the Labour Party.

Quill contested the 1937 general election as a sitting city councillor on the Cork Corporation, as one of 23 Labour candidates, receiving 14.9% of first preference votes, but was not elected. He ran again in the 1938 general election, this time as one of 30 Labour candidates, receiving 4,950 first preference votes (12.6%), but was once again not elected. This was to be his last general election campaign, however he would remain as an elected city councillor on Cork Corporation.

=== County councillor ===
According to A Biographical Dictionary of Cork, by Tim Cadogan and Jeremiah Falvey, Quill served as a councillor on Cork County Council for two periods. As a Transport member, he was nominated and won a seat in 1925, retaining his seat in 1928 and lost the seat in 1934, before winning a seat again in 1942 and serving until 1945. He was elected to both the Cork County Council and the Cork Corporation that year. Quill was at one time Chair of the South Cork Board of Public Assistance.

=== City councillor ===
Quill also served as a city councillor with Cork Corporation. The City Councillor's 1920–1945 roll book seems to record that T Quill was elected in 1936. In 1939, he is listed as a member of the Labour Party's Cork Centre Branch. There was a local election in the city almost every year from 1929 to 1936 to elect portions of the city council and others in 1942 and 1945. Quill was a member of the South Cork Board of Public Assistance and the South Cork Board of Public Health. He is still listed as a councillor in this book in 1944–1945. Quill served as Deputy Lord Mayor of Cork and on the Committee of Management of the South Infirmary.

=== Outlooks and accusations of anti-Semitism ===
In 1936, Quill said that "the Irish Labour Movement has its own road to travel and had no place for the cries of Fascism or Communism that plagued the world today."

During the 1940s, Quill became chair of the Liam Mellows Branch of the Labour Party. In this capacity he proved to be an enemy of Michael O'Riordan. The branch had been established by former members of the Curragh Camp's Communist Group. O'Riordan had retrospectively asserted that Quill was imposed as chair to ensure that Labour in Cork City could control the new branch. O'Riordan also stated that Quill had made an attack on what Quill "called 'the Jew boys' of Cork". It was during this time that the ITGWU had disaffiliated from the Labour Party and the National Labour Party was established on the basis that communists were infiltrating the party.

A report in the Irish Press suggests that the Administrative Council "had become aware that certain persons in Cork were engaging in activities which appear to be inconsistent with their membership of the Labour Party and accordingly they appointed a subcommittee to investigate the membership and administration of the Liam Mellows Branch".

O'Riordan's son, Manus, would later refer to Quill as an "anti-Semitic red-baiting villain" who was responsible for O'Riordan's expulsion.

=== Co-operative movement ===
During the 1920s, Quill established the City of Cork Co-operative Society with Con Desmond. Quill was the secretary of the City of Cork Co-operative Society and manager and secretary of the Cork Co-operative Bakery Society. This included social enterprises such as Cooperative Tea, Cooperative Cream and Cooperative Bread. He was also a member of the Cork Co-operators' Guild. He was also the editor of The Cork Co-Operator, a monthly publication of the co-operative movement in Cork. In a letter to the editor, published on the cover of the June 1939 issue, Steve Denny (director of the London Co-operative Society) described The Cork Co-Operator as a "bright little paper". Quill frequently attended the Co-operative Congress in the UK throughout the 1930s and 1940s. Inspired by Robert Owen, he built cottages for the workers on his land. Quill regarded himself as a Christian Socialist. He resigned his position in the co-operative movement in 1954. These societies were defunct by the time of his death in 1960.

In 2021, an article in The Southern Star described Quill as "an icon in the Irish co-operative movement".

== Later life ==
He married Mary McCarthy on 7 January 1930.

In the 1940s, Quill lived at Ferney House in Blackrock, Cork, where he grew vegetables and kept livestock. His first trial of Holstein Friesian cattle took place here, and he owned what The Southern Star described as "one of the largest and most successful herds in the country". He was used as an example in a 1950s advertisement titled "Friesian T.T Herd Makes History", and served as the honorary secretary of the Irish Friesian Society. He served on the General Committee of the Munster Agricultural Society, wrote a farming column for The Cork Examiner and contributed to The Evening Echo under the pen name Carrigeen. By the 1950s he had settled at a property near Blarney, left politics and was Chair of the Blarney National Farmer's Association. According to the Irish Independent, Quill was the Chair of the Federation of Cow Testing Associations.

He died on 10 June 1960, aged 59 and was buried in St. Finbarr's Cemetery. In an obituary published on 11 June 1960, the Evening Echo described him as an "authorative writer on agricultural matters". The Timothy Quill Perpetual Challenge Cup for the MAS (Munster Agricultural Society) Holstein Friesian Senior Cow Class at Cork Summer Show is named after him.

Dáil	Election	Deputy (Party)	Deputy (Party)	Deputy (Party)	Deputy (Party)
4th	1923	Daniel Corkery (Rep)	Daniel Vaughan (FP)	Thomas Nagle (Lab)	3 seats 1923–1937
5th	1927 (Jun)	Daniel Corkery (Ind.)	Daniel Vaughan (FP)	Timothy Quill (Lab)	3 seats 1923–1937
6th	1927 (Sep)	Daniel Corkery (FF)	Daniel Vaughan (FP)	Daniel O'Leary (CnaG)	3 seats 1923–1937
7th	1932	Seán Moylan (FF)	Daniel Vaughan (FP)	Daniel O'Leary (CnaG)	3 seats 1923–1937
8th	1933	Seán Moylan (FF)	Daniel Corkery (FF)	Daniel O'Leary (CnaG)	3 seats 1923–1937
9th	1937	Seán Moylan (FF)	Patrick Daly (FG)	Timothy Linehan (FG)	Con Meaney (FF)
10th	1938	Seán Moylan (FF)	Patrick Daly (FG)	Timothy Linehan (FG)	Con Meaney (FF)
11th	1943	Seán Moylan (FF)	Patrick Halliden (CnaT)	Timothy Linehan (FG)	Leo Skinner (FF)
12th	1944	Seán Moylan (FF)	Patrick Halliden (CnaT)	Patrick McAuliffe (Lab)	Leo Skinner (FF)
13th	1948	Seán Moylan (FF)	Patrick Halliden (CnaT)	Patrick McAuliffe (Lab)	3 seats 1948–1961
14th	1951	Seán Moylan (FF)	Denis O'Sullivan (FG)	Patrick McAuliffe (Lab)	3 seats 1948–1961
15th	1954	Seán Moylan (FF)	Denis O'Sullivan (FG)	Patrick McAuliffe (Lab)	3 seats 1948–1961
16th	1957	Batt Donegan (FF)	Denis O'Sullivan (FG)	Patrick McAuliffe (Lab)	3 seats 1948–1961
17th	1961	Constituency abolished. See Cork North-East and Cork Mid			
