= Eileen Desmond =

Irish politician (1932–2005)

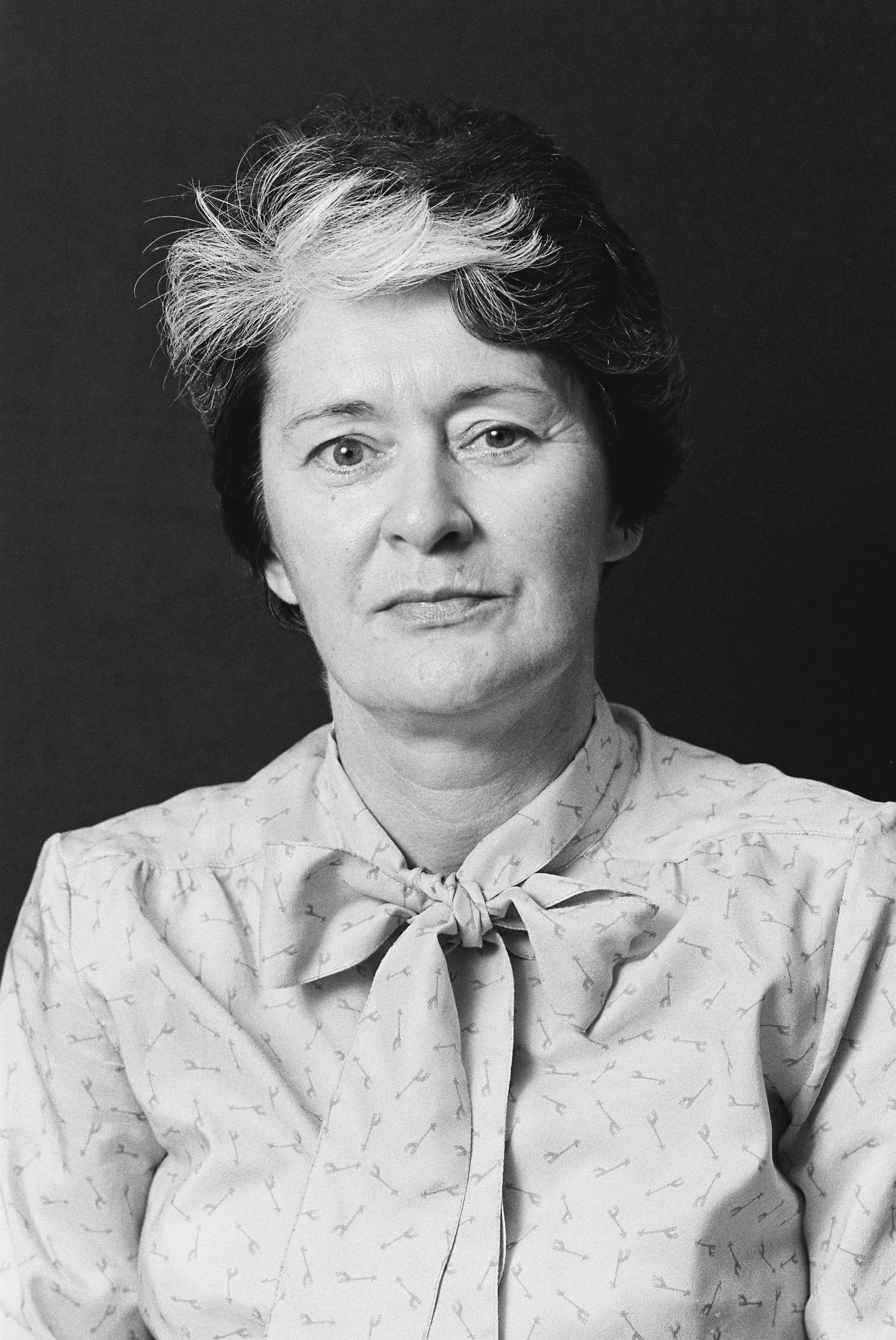
- Desmond in 1981

Minister for Health
- In office 30 June 1981 – 9 March 1982
- Taoiseach: Garret FitzGerald
- Preceded by: Michael Woods
- Succeeded by: Michael Woods

Minister for Social Welfare
- In office 30 June 1981 – 9 March 1982
- Taoiseach: Garret FitzGerald
- Preceded by: Michael Woods
- Succeeded by: Michael Woods

Teachta Dála
- In office June 1981 – February 1987
- Constituency: Cork South-Central
- In office February 1973 – June 1981
- In office March 1965 – June 1969
- Constituency: Cork Mid

Member of the European Parliament
- In office 1 July 1979 – 9 July 1981
- Constituency: Munster

Senator
- In office 5 November 1969 – 18 February 1973
- Constituency: Industrial and Commercial Panel

Personal details
- Born: Eileen Christine Harrington; 29 December 1932 Kinsale, County Cork, Ireland
- Died: 6 January 2005 (aged 72) Cork, Ireland
- Spouse: Dan Desmond (m. 1955; died 1964)
- Children: 2
- Education: University College Cork

Eileen Christine Desmond (née Harrington; 29 December 1932 – 6 January 2005) was an Irish Labour Party politician who served as Minister for Health and Minister for Social Welfare from 1981 to 1982. She was a Teachta Dála (TD) from 1965 to 1969 and 1973 to 1987. She also served as a Member of the European Parliament (MEP) for the Munster constituency from 1979 to 1981 and as a Senator for the Industrial and Commercial Panel from 1969 to 1973.

== Early life ==
She was born in Kinsale, County Cork, her father was a postman and part-time fisherman, who went blind when she was aged eleven, her mother was the local seamstress. She was educated locally at the Convent of Mercy in Kinsale, where she was one of only two girls in her class to sit the Leaving Certificate examination. Before entering politics she worked as a civil servant with the Department of Posts and Telegraphs. She married Dan Desmond in 1955, a Labour TD for Cork from 1948 to 1964, and they had two daughters.

== Politics ==
Desmond was elected to Dáil Éireann in a by-election on 10 March 1965, caused by the death of her husband Dan Desmond. Her victory in the Cork Mid constituency led Taoiseach Seán Lemass to dissolve the 17th Dáil, before she could assume her seat, and call a general election. She was elected for the second time in a year, but lost her seat at the 1969 general election. However, Desmond was then elected to the 12th Seanad on the Industrial and Commercial Panel, where she served until her re-election to the 20th Dáil following the 1973 general election. She supported the unsuccessful Contraceptives Bill in 1974.

She was elected to the European Parliament at the 1979 European Parliament election for the Munster constituency. However, her time in Europe was short-lived, as she returned to domestic politics when she was offered a position as Minister and the chance to impact national legislation. At the 1981 general election she switched her constituency to Cork South-Central. A Fine Gael–Labour Party coalition came to power and Desmond was appointed Minister for Health and for Social Welfare.

Desmond was the third woman to be appointed to cabinet since the foundation of the state in 1922, the first in a Fine Gael-Labour Party cabinet, and the first female officeholder of the health and social welfare ministries. Desmond was the only woman in that short-lived coalition Cabinet. She created the National Combat Poverty Agency, which addressed inequality. She achieved a 25% increase in social welfare allowance, a level never achieved before. However, the budget was defeated on 27 January 1982, leading to the dissolution of the 22nd Dáil, so the increases never came into effect.

Desmond left politics in 1987 for health reasons but stood unsuccessfully in the 1989 European Parliament election after her health improved. She died in 2005.

Political offices
Preceded by Michael Woods	Minister for Health; 1981–1982	Succeeded by Michael Woods
Preceded by Michael Woods	Minister for Social Welfare; 1981–1982	Succeeded by Michael Woods

Dáil	Election	Deputy (Party)	Deputy (Party)	Deputy (Party)	Deputy (Party)	Deputy (Party)
17th	1961	Dan Desmond (Lab)	Seán McCarthy (FF)	Con Meaney (FF)	Denis J. O'Sullivan (FG)	4 seats 1961–1977
17th	1965 by-election	Eileen Desmond (Lab)	Seán McCarthy (FF)	Con Meaney (FF)	Denis J. O'Sullivan (FG)	4 seats 1961–1977
18th	1965	Eileen Desmond (Lab)	Flor Crowley (FF)	Thomas Meaney (FF)	Donal Creed (FG)	4 seats 1961–1977
19th	1969	Philip Burton (FG)	Paddy Forde (FF)	Thomas Meaney (FF)	Donal Creed (FG)	4 seats 1961–1977
19th	1972 by-election	Philip Burton (FG)	Gene Fitzgerald (FF)	Thomas Meaney (FF)	Donal Creed (FG)	4 seats 1961–1977
20th	1973	Eileen Desmond (Lab)	Gene Fitzgerald (FF)	Thomas Meaney (FF)	Donal Creed (FG)	4 seats 1961–1977
21st	1977	Eileen Desmond (Lab)	Gene Fitzgerald (FF)	Thomas Meaney (FF)	Donal Creed (FG)	Barry Cogan (FF)
22nd	1981	Constituency abolished. See Cork North-Central and Cork South-Central				

Dáil	Election	Deputy (Party)	Deputy (Party)	Deputy (Party)	Deputy (Party)	Deputy (Party)
22nd	1981	Eileen Desmond (Lab)	Gene Fitzgerald (FF)	Pearse Wyse (FF)	Hugh Coveney (FG)	Peter Barry (FG)
23rd	1982 (Feb)	Eileen Desmond (Lab)	Gene Fitzgerald (FF)	Pearse Wyse (FF)	Jim Corr (FG)	Peter Barry (FG)
24th	1982 (Nov)	Eileen Desmond (Lab)	Gene Fitzgerald (FF)	Pearse Wyse (FF)	Hugh Coveney (FG)	Peter Barry (FG)
25th	1987	Toddy O'Sullivan (Lab)	John Dennehy (FF)	Batt O'Keeffe (FF)	Pearse Wyse (PDs)	Peter Barry (FG)
26th	1989	Toddy O'Sullivan (Lab)	John Dennehy (FF)	Micheál Martin (FF)	Pearse Wyse (PDs)	Peter Barry (FG)
27th	1992	Toddy O'Sullivan (Lab)	Batt O'Keeffe (FF)	Micheál Martin (FF)	Pat Cox (PDs)	Peter Barry (FG)
27th	1994 by-election	Toddy O'Sullivan (Lab)	Batt O'Keeffe (FF)	Micheál Martin (FF)	Hugh Coveney (FG)	Peter Barry (FG)
28th	1997	John Dennehy (FF)	Batt O'Keeffe (FF)	Micheál Martin (FF)	Hugh Coveney (FG)	Deirdre Clune (FG)
28th	1998 by-election	John Dennehy (FF)	Batt O'Keeffe (FF)	Micheál Martin (FF)	Simon Coveney (FG)	Deirdre Clune (FG)
29th	2002	John Dennehy (FF)	Batt O'Keeffe (FF)	Micheál Martin (FF)	Simon Coveney (FG)	Dan Boyle (GP)
30th	2007	Ciarán Lynch (Lab)	Michael McGrath (FF)	Micheál Martin (FF)	Simon Coveney (FG)	Deirdre Clune (FG)
31st	2011	Ciarán Lynch (Lab)	Michael McGrath (FF)	Micheál Martin (FF)	Simon Coveney (FG)	Jerry Buttimer (FG)
32nd	2016	Donnchadh Ó Laoghaire (SF)	Michael McGrath (FF)	Micheál Martin (FF)	Simon Coveney (FG)	4 seats 2016–2024
33rd	2020	Donnchadh Ó Laoghaire (SF)	Michael McGrath (FF)	Micheál Martin (FF)	Simon Coveney (FG)	4 seats 2016–2024
34th	2024	Donnchadh Ó Laoghaire (SF)	Séamus McGrath (FF)	Micheál Martin (FF)	Jerry Buttimer (FG)	Pádraig Rice (SD)
