= Cork Mid (Dáil constituency) =

Dáil constituency (1961–1981)

- Former Dáil constituency

Former constituency
- Created: 1961
- Abolished: 1981
- Seats: 4 (1961–1977); 5 (1977–1981)
- Local government areas: County Cork (1961–1981); Cork county borough (1977–1981)
- Created from: Cork North
- Replaced by: Cork North-Central; Cork South-Central

Cork Mid was a Dáil constituency represented in Dáil Éireann, the lower house of the Oireachtas (the Irish legislature) from 1961 to 1981. The constituency was represented by 4 deputies (Teachtaí Dála, commonly known as TDs) from 1961 to 1977, and then 5 from 1977 until its abolition in 1981. The method of election was proportional representation by means of the single transferable vote (PR-STV).

== Boundaries ==
From 1961 to 1969, its boundaries were defined as: "The administrative county of Cork except the portions thereof which are comprised in the borough constituency of Cork and the county constituencies of North-East Cork and South-West Cork."

From 1961 to 1977, its boundaries were defined as: "The administrative county of Cork except the portions thereof which are comprised in the borough constituency of Cork and the county constituencies of North-East Cork, South-West Cork and South Kerry."

From 1977 to 1981, its boundaries were defined as: "The administrative county of Cork, except the parts thereof which are comprised in the constituencies of Cork North-East, Cork South-West and Kerry South; and the following wards in the county borough of Cork: Bishopstown E, Gillabbey B, Gillabbey C, Glasheen A, Glasheen B, Glasheen C, Pouladuff A, Pouladuff B, The Lough, Togher A, Togher B."

== TDs ==
Teachtaí Dála (TDs) for Cork Mid 1961–1981
Key to parties: FF = Fianna Fáil; FG = Fine Gael; Lab = Labour
Dáil	Election	Deputy (Party)	Deputy (Party)	Deputy (Party)	Deputy (Party)	Deputy (Party)
17th	1961	Dan Desmond (Lab)	Seán McCarthy (FF)	Con Meaney (FF)	Denis J. O'Sullivan (FG)	4 seats 1961–1977
17th	1965 by-election	Eileen Desmond (Lab)	Seán McCarthy (FF)	Con Meaney (FF)	Denis J. O'Sullivan (FG)	4 seats 1961–1977
18th	1965	Eileen Desmond (Lab)	Flor Crowley (FF)	Thomas Meaney (FF)	Donal Creed (FG)	4 seats 1961–1977
19th	1969	Philip Burton (FG)	Paddy Forde (FF)	Thomas Meaney (FF)	Donal Creed (FG)	4 seats 1961–1977
19th	1972 by-election	Philip Burton (FG)	Gene Fitzgerald (FF)	Thomas Meaney (FF)	Donal Creed (FG)	4 seats 1961–1977
20th	1973	Eileen Desmond (Lab)	Gene Fitzgerald (FF)	Thomas Meaney (FF)	Donal Creed (FG)	4 seats 1961–1977
21st	1977	Eileen Desmond (Lab)	Gene Fitzgerald (FF)	Thomas Meaney (FF)	Donal Creed (FG)	Barry Cogan (FF)
22nd	1981	Constituency abolished. See Cork North-Central and Cork South-Central				

Note: The columns in this table are used only for presentational purposes, and no significance should be attached to the order of columns. For details of the order in which seats were won at each election, see the detailed results of that election.

== Elections ==
*: Outgoing TD

=== 1977 general election ===
1977 general election: Cork Mid
Party	Candidate	FPv%	Count				
Party	Candidate	FPv%	1	2	3	4	5
Fianna Fáil	Gene Fitzgerald	19.9	12,179				
Fianna Fáil	Thomas Meaney	19.4	11,877				
Labour	Eileen Desmond	14.5	8,902	9,001	9,112	10,276	
Fine Gael	Donal Creed	13.2	8,088	8,163	8,241	10,413	
Fianna Fáil	Barry Cogan	10.7	6,563	7,545	8,151	8,259	8,595
Fine Gael	Frank Crowley	7.6	4,681	4,695	4,777	5,614	
Fianna Fáil	John Dennehy	7.4	4,522	5,292	6,069	6,188	6,470
Fine Gael	Seán O'Leary	7.2	4,436	4,468	4,480		
Electorate: 75,031 Valid: 61,248 Spoilt: 446 (0.7%) Quota: 10,209 Turnout: 61,694 (82.2%)

=== 1973 general election ===
1973 general election: Cork Mid
Party	Candidate	FPv%	Count		
Party	Candidate	FPv%	1	2	3
Fianna Fáil	Thomas Meaney	25.6	10,400		
Fianna Fáil	Gene Fitzgerald	23.6	9,584		
Fine Gael	Donal Creed	19.1	7,728	8,273	
Labour	Eileen Desmond	15.2	6,170	7,152	8,188
Fine Gael	Philip Burton	13.9	5,629	6,245	6,406
Fine Gael	Daniel O'Leary	2.6	1,055	1,198	1,471
Electorate: 49,402 Valid: 40,566 Quota: 8,114 Turnout: 82.1%

=== 1972 by-election ===
Following the death of Fianna Fáil TD Paddy Forde on 13 May 1972, a by-election was held on 2 August 1972. The seat was won by the Fianna Fáil candidate Gene Fitzgerald.

1972 by-election: Cork Mid
Party	Candidate	FPv%	Count	
Party	Candidate	FPv%	1	2
Fianna Fáil	Gene Fitzgerald	49.5	19,959	20,214
Fine Gael	Denis J. O'Sullivan	31.6	12,530	12,788
Labour	Eileen Desmond	15.9	6,301	6,711
Aontacht Éireann	Paddy O'Callaghan	3.0	1,172	
Electorate: 49,402 Valid: 39,962 Quota: 19,982 Turnout: 80.9%

=== 1969 general election ===
1969 general election: Cork Mid
Party	Candidate	FPv%	Count					
Party	Candidate	FPv%	1	2	3	4	5	6
Fianna Fáil	Thomas Meaney	23.0	8,978					
Fine Gael	Donal Creed	18.9	7,400	7,491	8,583			
Fine Gael	Philip Burton	13.6	5,310	5,351	5,686	6,297	6,626	7,358
Labour	Eileen Desmond	12.6	4,936	4,997	5,129	6,762	7,000	7,088
Fianna Fáil	Paddy Forde	11.0	4,284	4,774	4,917	5,004	8,000	
Fianna Fáil	Batt Donegan	8.9	3,468	3,859	3,878	4,102		
Labour	Neil Lehane	7.3	2,866	2,962	2,986			
Fine Gael	Patrick Lombard	4.7	1,821	1,836				
Electorate: 47,880 Valid: 39,063 Quota: 7,813 Turnout: 81.6%

=== 1965 general election ===
1965 general election: Cork Mid
Party	Candidate	FPv%	Count					
Party	Candidate	FPv%	1	2	3	4	5	6
Labour	Eileen Desmond	25.0	10,041					
Fianna Fáil	Flor Crowley	19.7	7,884	8,185				
Fine Gael	Donal Creed	15.2	6,103	6,792	6,949	7,461	7,890	8,011
Fianna Fáil	Thomas Meaney	14.2	5,683	5,870	5,939	5,969	6,130	8,948
Fine Gael	Denis J. O'Sullivan	12.3	4,935	5,278	5,328	5,602	5,939	6,044
Fianna Fáil	Paddy Forde	7.7	3,099	3,304	3,425	3,464	3,578	
Independent	Thomas O'Sullivan	2.7	1,089	1,143	1,189	1,199		
Fine Gael	Edward McCarthy	2.0	789	897	937			
Independent	Sylvester Cotter	1.2	498	627				
Electorate: 50,220 Valid: 40,121 Quota: 8,025 Turnout: 79.9%

=== 1965 by-election ===
Following the death of Labour TD Dan Desmond on 9 December 1964, a by-election was held on 10 March 1965. The seat was won by the Labour candidate Eileen Desmond, widow of the deceased TD.

1965 by-election: Cork Mid
Party	Candidate	FPv%	Count		
Party	Candidate	FPv%	1	2	3
Fianna Fáil	Flor Crowley	36.2	13,779	13,932	15,093
Labour	Eileen Desmond	33.5	12,752	12,937	20,756
Fine Gael	Donal Creed	28.8	10,957	11,105	
Independent	Sylvester Cotter	1.6	590		
Electorate: 50,220 Valid: 38,078 Quota: 19,040 Turnout: 75.8%

=== 1961 general election ===
1961 general election: Cork Mid
Party	Candidate	FPv%	Count			
Party	Candidate	FPv%	1	2	3	4
Labour	Dan Desmond	27.3	10,035			
Fine Gael	Denis J. O'Sullivan	21.2	7,787			
Fianna Fáil	Con Meaney	17.9	6,586	7,039	7,101	7,736
Fianna Fáil	Seán MacCarthy	17.7	6,499	7,315	7,335	8,523
Fine Gael	Timothy Desmond	10.8	3,976	5,115	5,457	5,575
Fianna Fáil	David McGrath	5.1	1,890	2,162	2,170	
Electorate: 49,390 Valid: 36,773 Quota: 7,355 Turnout: 74.5%

== See also ==
- Dáil constituencies
- Politics of the Republic of Ireland
- Historic Dáil constituencies
- Elections in the Republic of Ireland
