= Daniel Corkery (Irish republican) =

Irish politician (1883–1961)

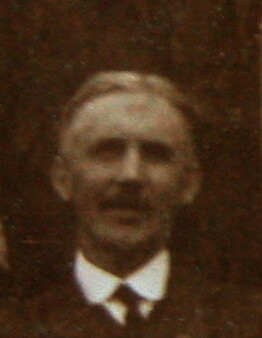
- Corkery in 1929

Senator
- In office 27 April 1938 – 21 April 1948
- Constituency: Industrial and Commercial Panel

Teachta Dála
- In office January 1933 – July 1937
- In office August 1923 – February 1932
- Constituency: Cork North
- In office May 1921 – August 1923
- Constituency: Cork Mid, North, South, South East and West

Personal details
- Born: 20 September 1883 Macroom, County Cork, Ireland
- Died: 23 April 1961 (aged 77) County Cork, Ireland
- Party: Sinn Féin; Fianna Fáil
- Spouse: Mary Murphy
- Children: 3

Daniel Corkery (20 September 1883 – 23 April 1961) was an Irish politician and Commandant in the Irish Republican Army (IRA) during the Irish War of Independence.

== Revolutionary period ==
From Macroom, County Cork, Corkery was served short terms of imprisonment in 1916 and 1917 for Irish Volunteers activity. During the Irish War of Independence, he took part in barracks attacks and operations against British forces. He one of the main IRA officers during the Coolavokig ambush in February 1921.

At the 1921 general election he was elected unopposed to the Second Dáil as a Sinn Féin Teachta Dála (TD) for the Cork Mid, North, South, South East and West constituency. An anti-Treaty member from January 1922, he did not take his seat in the 3rd Dáil. During the Irish Civil War Corkery worked on anti Anglo-Irish Treaty publicity issues in Cork with well-known writers/journalists: Frank O'Connor, Seán Ó Faoláin and Robert Brennan.

Corkery was arrested by National forces on 4 November 1922 and interned in Cork County prison, Cork, Hare Park internment camp and Mountjoy Prison, Dublin. He stated that he was granted parole in June 1923 in connection with the death of his wife following which he returned to his internment and was finally released in February 1924. Corkery was later awarded a pension by the Irish government under the Military Service Pensions Act, 1934 for his service with the Irish Volunteers and the IRA between 1917 and 1923.

== Politics ==
He was elected to the 4th Dail at the 1923 general election for the new Cork North constituency, again as an anti-treaty republican. After his re-election at the June 1927 general election as independent republican, he joined the newly created Fianna Fáil party and took his seat with other Fianna Fáil deputies in August 1927.

Corkery was re-elected as a Fianna Fáil TD at the September 1927 general election, but lost his seat at the 1932 general election. He re-gained his seat at the 1933 general election, but again lost his seat at the 1937 general election. In 1938 he was elected to the revived Seanad Éireann and continued as a Senator until 1948.

Dáil	Election	Deputy (Party)	Deputy (Party)	Deputy (Party)	Deputy (Party)	Deputy (Party)	Deputy (Party)	Deputy (Party)	Deputy (Party)
2nd	1921	Seán MacSwiney (SF)	Seán Nolan (SF)	Seán Moylan (SF)	Daniel Corkery (SF)	Michael Collins (SF)	Seán Hales (SF)	Seán Hayes (SF)	Patrick O'Keeffe (SF)
3rd	1922	Michael Bradley (Lab)	Thomas Nagle (Lab)	Seán Moylan (AT-SF)	Daniel Corkery (AT-SF)	Michael Collins (PT-SF)	Seán Hales (PT-SF)	Seán Hayes (PT-SF)	Daniel Vaughan (FP)
4th	1923	Constituency abolished. See Cork North and Cork West							

Dáil	Election	Deputy (Party)	Deputy (Party)	Deputy (Party)	Deputy (Party)
4th	1923	Daniel Corkery (Rep)	Daniel Vaughan (FP)	Thomas Nagle (Lab)	3 seats 1923–1937
5th	1927 (Jun)	Daniel Corkery (Ind.)	Daniel Vaughan (FP)	Timothy Quill (Lab)	3 seats 1923–1937
6th	1927 (Sep)	Daniel Corkery (FF)	Daniel Vaughan (FP)	Daniel O'Leary (CnaG)	3 seats 1923–1937
7th	1932	Seán Moylan (FF)	Daniel Vaughan (FP)	Daniel O'Leary (CnaG)	3 seats 1923–1937
8th	1933	Seán Moylan (FF)	Daniel Corkery (FF)	Daniel O'Leary (CnaG)	3 seats 1923–1937
9th	1937	Seán Moylan (FF)	Patrick Daly (FG)	Timothy Linehan (FG)	Con Meaney (FF)
10th	1938	Seán Moylan (FF)	Patrick Daly (FG)	Timothy Linehan (FG)	Con Meaney (FF)
11th	1943	Seán Moylan (FF)	Patrick Halliden (CnaT)	Timothy Linehan (FG)	Leo Skinner (FF)
12th	1944	Seán Moylan (FF)	Patrick Halliden (CnaT)	Patrick McAuliffe (Lab)	Leo Skinner (FF)
13th	1948	Seán Moylan (FF)	Patrick Halliden (CnaT)	Patrick McAuliffe (Lab)	3 seats 1948–1961
14th	1951	Seán Moylan (FF)	Denis O'Sullivan (FG)	Patrick McAuliffe (Lab)	3 seats 1948–1961
15th	1954	Seán Moylan (FF)	Denis O'Sullivan (FG)	Patrick McAuliffe (Lab)	3 seats 1948–1961
16th	1957	Batt Donegan (FF)	Denis O'Sullivan (FG)	Patrick McAuliffe (Lab)	3 seats 1948–1961
17th	1961	Constituency abolished. See Cork North-East and Cork Mid			
