= Barry Cogan (politician) =

Irish politician (born 1936)

Senator
- In office 8 October 1981 – 13 May 1982
- Constituency: Industrial and Commercial Panel

Teachta Dála
- In office June 1977 – June 1981
- Constituency: Cork Mid

Personal details
- Born: 27 September 1936 (age 89) County Cork, Ireland
- Party: Fianna Fáil

Barry Cogan (born 27 September 1936) is a retired Irish Fianna Fáil politician who served as a Teachta Dála (TD) for 4 years and a Senator for less than one year.

He was elected to Dáil Éireann on his first attempt, at the 1977 general election, when he took the fifth of five seats in the Cork Mid constituency. When that constituency was abolished in boundary changes for the 1981 general election, Cogan stood unsuccessfully in the new Cork South-Central constituency. After his defeat, he was elected to the 15th Seanad Éireann on the Industrial and Commercial Panel.

At the general election in February 1982, he was defeated again in Cork South-Central, and also in the subsequent Seanad election. He stood again the next four general elections, but was never returned to the Oireachtas. At the 1999 local elections he was elected to Cork County Council a councillor for Carrigaline, and served one term, losing that seat at the 2004 local elections.

In 1985, Cogan was one of the key founders in Carrigaline of what became South Coast Community Television, a community group established to provide British TV channels to Carrigaline and subsequently other areas of County Cork.

Dáil	Election	Deputy (Party)	Deputy (Party)	Deputy (Party)	Deputy (Party)	Deputy (Party)
17th	1961	Dan Desmond (Lab)	Seán McCarthy (FF)	Con Meaney (FF)	Denis J. O'Sullivan (FG)	4 seats 1961–1977
17th	1965 by-election	Eileen Desmond (Lab)	Seán McCarthy (FF)	Con Meaney (FF)	Denis J. O'Sullivan (FG)	4 seats 1961–1977
18th	1965	Eileen Desmond (Lab)	Flor Crowley (FF)	Thomas Meaney (FF)	Donal Creed (FG)	4 seats 1961–1977
19th	1969	Philip Burton (FG)	Paddy Forde (FF)	Thomas Meaney (FF)	Donal Creed (FG)	4 seats 1961–1977
19th	1972 by-election	Philip Burton (FG)	Gene Fitzgerald (FF)	Thomas Meaney (FF)	Donal Creed (FG)	4 seats 1961–1977
20th	1973	Eileen Desmond (Lab)	Gene Fitzgerald (FF)	Thomas Meaney (FF)	Donal Creed (FG)	4 seats 1961–1977
21st	1977	Eileen Desmond (Lab)	Gene Fitzgerald (FF)	Thomas Meaney (FF)	Donal Creed (FG)	Barry Cogan (FF)
22nd	1981	Constituency abolished. See Cork North-Central and Cork South-Central				
