= Vivian O'Callaghan =

Irish politician (born 1944)

Senator
- In office 25 April 1987 – 1 November 1989
- Constituency: Nominated by the Taoiseach

Personal details
- Born: 7 August 1944 (age 80)
- Political party: Fianna Fáil

Vivian O'Callaghan (born 7 August 1944) is an Irish former Fianna Fáil politician. He served as a member of Seanad Éireann from 1987 to 1989. He was nominated by the Taoiseach Charles Haughey to the 18th Seanad in 1987. He was an unsuccessful candidate at the 1989 and 1993 Seanad elections. He is a former member of Cork County Council.
