= Seán Hales =

Irish politician (1880–1922)

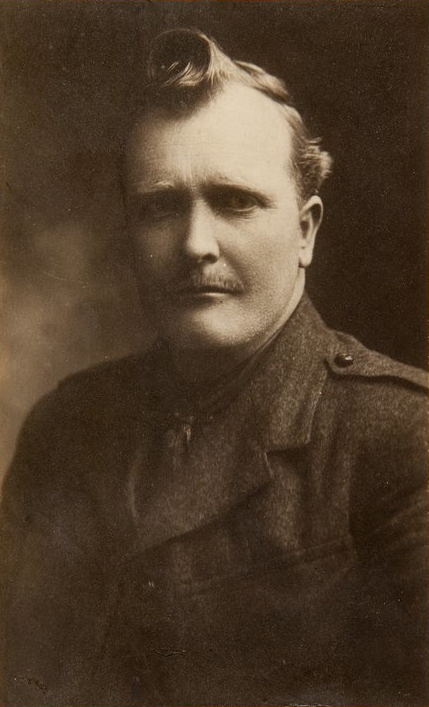
- Hales, c.1910s

Teachta Dála
- In office June 1922 – 7 December 1922
- In office May 1921 – June 1922
- Constituency: Cork Mid, North, South, South East and West

Personal details
- Born: John Hales; 30 March 1880 Ballinadee, County Cork, Ireland
- Died: 7 December 1922 (aged 42) Ormonde Quay, Dublin, Ireland
- Relatives: Tom Hales (brother)

Military service
- Branch/service: Irish Republican Army; National Army
- Rank: Brigadier general
- Battles/wars: Irish War of Independence; Irish Civil War

Seán Hales (30 March 1880 – 7 December 1922) was an Irish political activist and member of Dáil Éireann from May 1921 to December 1922.

== Biography ==
Born John Hales in Ballinadee, Bandon, County Cork, one of nine children of Robert Hales, a farmer, and Margaret (née Fitzgerald) Hales. He and his brothers (Tom, William, and Bob) were involved in the Irish Republican Army (IRA) during the Irish War of Independence.

At the 1921 elections Hales was elected to the Second Dáil as a Sinn Féin member for the Cork Mid, North, South, South East and West constituency.

At the 1922 general election, he was elected to the 3rd Dáil as a pro-Treaty Sinn Féin Teachta Dála (TD) for the same constituency. He received 4,374 first-preference votes (7.9%). Shortly afterwards, the Irish Civil War broke out between the pro-Treaty faction, who were in favour of setting up the Irish Free State and the anti-Treaty faction, who would not accept the abolition of the Irish Republic.

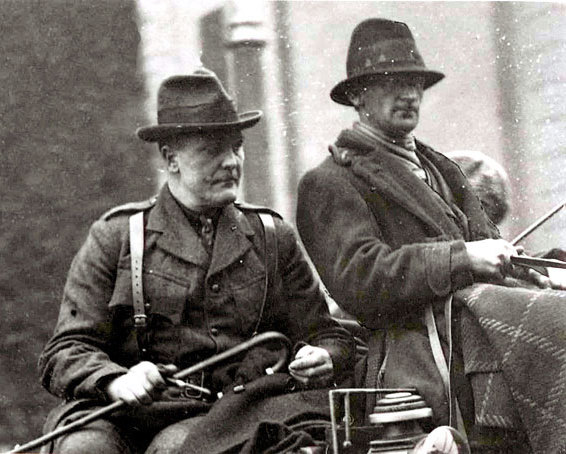
Hales (left, in uniform) taken on 7 December 1922, the date of his assassination

On 7 December 1922, Hales was killed by anti-Treaty IRA men as he left the Dáil. Another TD, Pádraic Ó Máille, was also shot and badly wounded in the incident. His killing was in reprisal for the Free State's execution of anti-treaty prisoners. In revenge for Hales' killing, four republican leaders (Joe McKelvey, Rory O'Connor, Liam Mellows and Richard Barrett) were executed the following day, 8 December 1922.

According to information passed on to playwright Ulick O'Connor, an anti-Treaty IRA volunteer named Owen Donnelly of Glasnevin was responsible for the killing of Hales. Seán Caffrey, an anti-treaty intelligence officer, told O'Connor that Donnelly had not been ordered to shoot Hales specifically but was following the general order issued by Liam Lynch to shoot TDs or senators if they could.

A commemorative statue of Hales was unveiled at Bank Place in Bandon, in 1930.

Dáil	Election	Deputy (Party)	Deputy (Party)	Deputy (Party)	Deputy (Party)	Deputy (Party)	Deputy (Party)	Deputy (Party)	Deputy (Party)
2nd	1921	Seán MacSwiney (SF)	Seán Nolan (SF)	Seán Moylan (SF)	Daniel Corkery (SF)	Michael Collins (SF)	Seán Hales (SF)	Seán Hayes (SF)	Patrick O'Keeffe (SF)
3rd	1922	Michael Bradley (Lab)	Thomas Nagle (Lab)	Seán Moylan (AT-SF)	Daniel Corkery (AT-SF)	Michael Collins (PT-SF)	Seán Hales (PT-SF)	Seán Hayes (PT-SF)	Daniel Vaughan (FP)
4th	1923	Constituency abolished. See Cork North and Cork West							
