= Eamon Dee =

Irish politician

Teachta Dála
- In office May 1921 – June 1922
- Constituency: Waterford–Tipperary East

Personal details
- Party: Sinn Féin

Eamon Dee was an Irish Sinn Féin politician. He was elected unopposed as a Sinn Féin Teachta Dála (TD) to the Second Dáil at the 1921 elections for the Waterford–Tipperary East constituency. He opposed the Anglo-Irish Treaty and voted against it.

He stood as an anti-Treaty Sinn Féin candidate (with Vincent White, Cathal Brugha and Séumas Robinson for Waterford–Tipperary East at the 1922 general election but was not elected.

Dáil	Election	Deputy (Party)	Deputy (Party)	Deputy (Party)	Deputy (Party)	Deputy (Party)
2nd	1921	Eamon Dee (SF)	Frank Drohan (SF)	Cathal Brugha (SF)	Vincent White (SF)	Séumas Robinson (SF)
3rd	1922	John Butler (Lab)	Nicholas Phelan (Lab)	Cathal Brugha (AT-SF)	Vincent White (PT-SF)	Daniel Byrne (FP)
4th	1923	Constituency abolished. See Waterford and Tipperary				
