= Tom Hales (Irish republican) =

Irish politician (1892–1966)

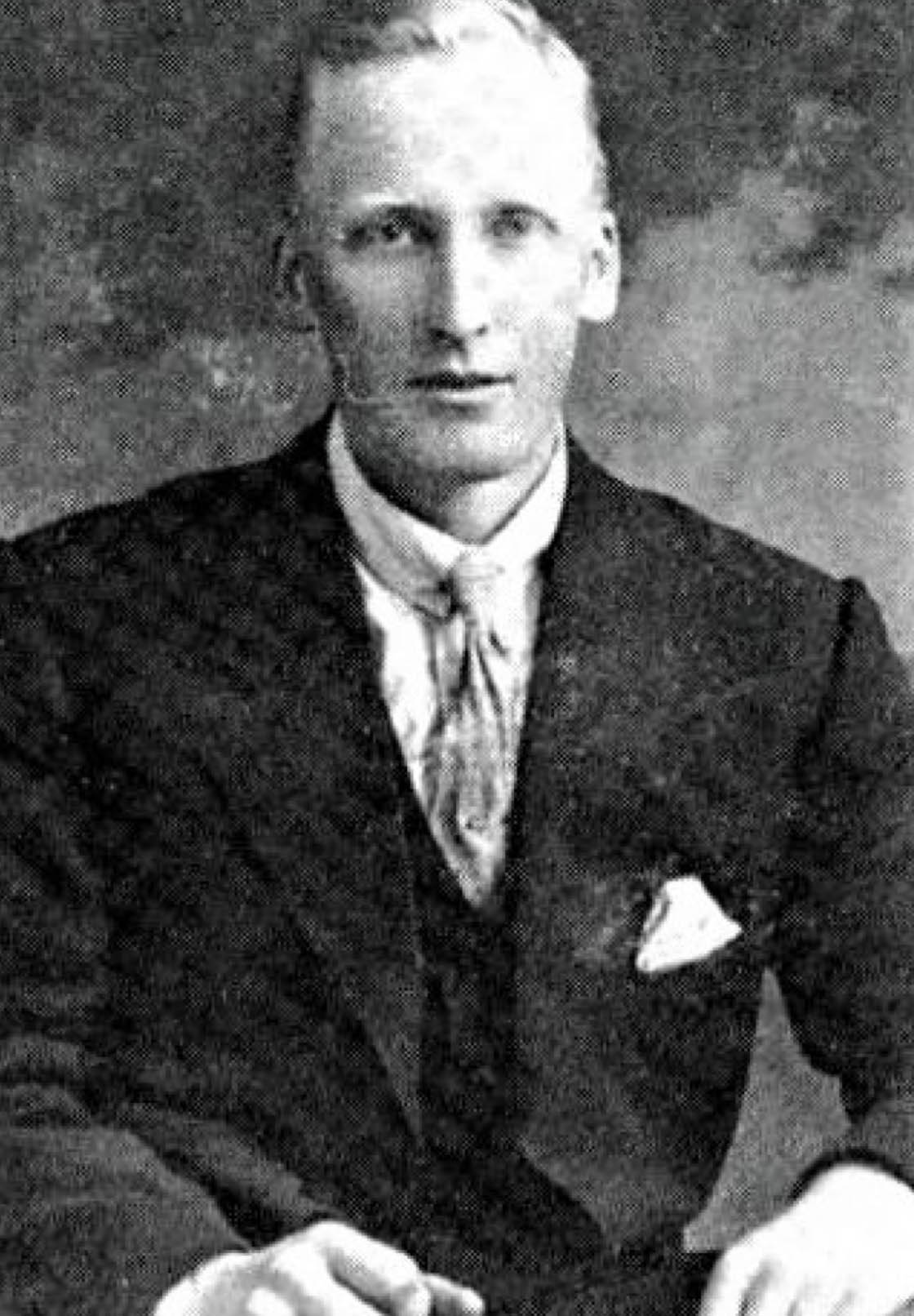
- Hales, c. 1920s

Teachta Dála
- In office January 1933 – July 1937
- Constituency: Cork West

Personal details
- Born: 5 March 1892 Ballinadee, County Cork, Ireland
- Died: 29 April 1966 (aged 74) Cork, Ireland
- Party: Fianna Fáil
- Other political affiliations: Clann na Poblachta
- Spouse: Ann Lehane (m. 1927)
- Children: 5
- Relatives: Seán Hales (brother)

Military service
- Branch/service: Irish Volunteers; Irish Republican Army; Anti-Treaty IRA
- Battles/wars: Irish War of Independence; Irish Civil War

Thomas Hales (5 March 1892 – 29 April 1966) was an Irish Republican Army (IRA) volunteer and politician from West Cork.

== Early years and childhood ==
Thomas Hales was born at Knocknacurra, Ballinadee, near Bandon on a family farm owned by his father, Robert Hales, an activist in the Irish Land War and a reputed member of the Irish Republican Brotherhood (IRB) and his wife, Margaret (née Fitzgerald), Hales was the sixth of nine children (five sons and four daughters). He was educated at Ballinadee national school and Warner's Lane school, Bandon. After leaving school he worked at Harte's timber yard, Bandon.

== Irish War of Independence ==
Tom Hales joined the Irish Volunteers in 1913. He was a part of a group of volunteers who planned to rise up in Cork during the 1916 Easter Rising, however they received last minute orders to stand down. By May 1916 Tom Hales and his brothers, Seán, Bob, and William, were fighting with the IRA in west Cork during the Irish War of Independence.

Tom Hales was involved with the Irish Volunteer movement from its inception in November 1913. Elected a delegate at the Volunteer national convention in the Abbey Theatre in 1915, he was among the majority who voted for the election of the national executive.

Hale was mobilised during the Easter Rising and sent a number of dispatches to Cork requesting further instructions. Ultimately, however, there was no uprising in Cork to match that in Dublin. The Volunteers gave up their arms and were later arrested. Terence MacSwiney was arrested in Hales' home on 3 May 1916 and Hales himself escaped and went on the run. He stated that he was listed as 'wanted' in the Hue and Cry police gazette.

In 1918, Hales took part in a raid on a British gunboat and held 25 armed Royal Irish Constabulary (RIC) members prisoner at Snugmore Castle. Hales took part in a decoy in assisting his elder brother, Seán, to escape after his arrest in connection with the German Plot. He was elected Battalion Commandant of the 1st (Bandon) Battalion (1917–19), and Brigade Commandant of Cork 3rd Brigade, IRA, in January 1919.

In December 1919, he took part in an ambush against the RIC at Kilbrittain and Bandon and was involved in the manufacture of gunpowder for IRA munitions. By this point he was the commander of the Third Cork Brigade of the IRA. On 26 July 1920, Hales along with Pat Harte were arrested by soldiers from the Essex Regiment. During this time period Arthur Percival was an Essex Regiment company commander and later the intelligence officer of the 1st Battalion. Percival was accused of brutality towards prisoners.

The pair were taken to a nearby military barracks, where they were severely beaten while being interrogated by officers of the regiment. Hales had his fingernails pulled out, this event later inspired a scene in the film The Wind That Shakes the Barley. However, neither Hales nor Harte gave up any information, and were eventually sent to a military hospital to recuperate. Hales was tried and was eventually sentenced to two years' penal servitude, which he served in Pentonville and Dartmoor prisons in England. He was commander of the Irish prisoners at Pentonville, but was released following a general amnesty after the Anglo-Irish Treaty in December 1921. According to Tom Barry, Harte suffered brain damage and went insane before dying in Broadmoor Hospital.

A fifth Hales brother, Donal, settled in Genoa from 1913, was appointed Irish Consular and Commercial Agent for Italy in February 1919. In this capacity he played a leading propaganda role; several letters from Michael Collins to Donal Hales still exist which were used by Hales to promote international awareness of the Irish conflict in Italian publications. Donal oversaw a failed attempt to import a substantial amount of weapons and ammunition (captured Austrian stock from the World War I) from Genoa in the spring of 1921, through the person of Gabriele D'Annunzio.

== Irish Civil War, against brother ==
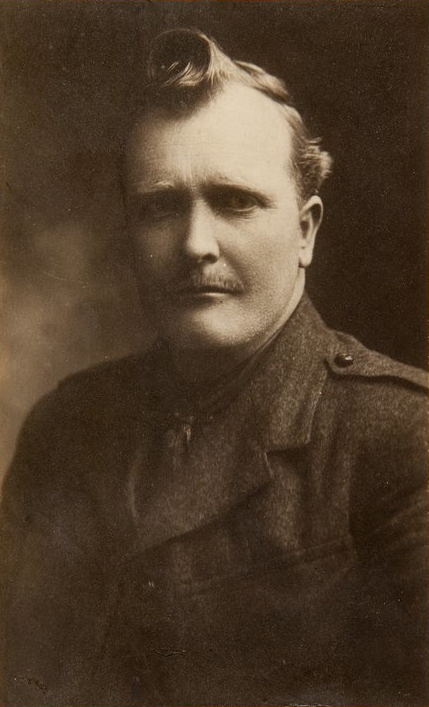
Tom and his brother Seán, pictured here, fought together in the Irish War of Independence but on opposite sides of the Irish Civil War. Seán would be assassinated during the Civil war.

During the Irish Civil War, Tom and Seán Hales fought on opposite sides, with Tom fighting against the Anglo-Irish Treaty with the Anti-Treaty IRA while Seán joined the newly formed National Army of the Irish Free State.

Tom Hales was elected to the anti-Treaty IRA executive in March 1922, but resigned in June over a proposal to prevent the Free State's first general election in June 1922. He resumed his old rank during the civil war as commander of Cork 3 Brigade. While he and his brother, Seán, ended up on opposite sides of the war, the brothers never openly criticised one another, for their rival political stances.

During the Civil War in July 1922 Tom Hales took part in the raid and capture of Skibbereen Barracks and Ballineen by anti-Treaty forces. He was also involved in a skirmish with Free State troops at Newcestown. Hales was arrested in November 1922 and imprisoned first in Cork and then at the Curragh. He was released in December 1923 having taken part in a hunger strike for 14 days. Hales mentions in his application for a military pension that he was a member of the Supreme Council of the IRB at this time.

In December 1922, his brother, Seán, was assassinated by the anti-Treaty IRA in Dublin, in reprisal for the Free State government's execution of IRA prisoners. Hales was later awarded a pension by the Irish government under the Military Service Pensions Act, 1934 for his service with the Irish Volunteers and the IRA between 1917 and 1923.

== Fianna Fáil and later politics ==
Hales was elected to Dáil Éireann as a Fianna Fáil Teachta Dála (TD) for the Cork West constituency at the 1933 general election. Hales resigned from Fianna Fáil in June 1936 stated he could not support their policy on interning IRA members. He failed to retain his seat as an independent candidate at the 1937 general election.

He also unsuccessfully contested the 1944 general election as an independent candidate and the 1948 general election as a candidate for Clann na Poblachta, he got 2,287 (7.93%) votes. Hales made his living as farmer. A member of the Mallow area board of the beet growers' association from 1934 to 1942, he was also connected with other farming organisations. He married Ann Lehane from Tirelton, Macroom, on 30 April 1927; they had five children, Hales died in 1966, aged 74.

== Sources ==
- Peter Hart, The I.R.A.& its enemies, violence and community in Cork 1916-1923, Oxford University Press, (1998), pages 187–201, "The Rise and Fall of a Revolutionary Family".
- Donal Hales, Witness Statement, Bureau of Military History (Dublin)

Dáil	Election	Deputy (Party)	Deputy (Party)	Deputy (Party)	Deputy (Party)	Deputy (Party)
4th	1923	Timothy J. Murphy (Lab)	Seán Buckley (Rep)	Cornelius Connolly (CnaG)	John Prior (CnaG)	Timothy O'Donovan (FP)
5th	1927 (Jun)	Timothy J. Murphy (Lab)	Thomas Mullins (FF)	Timothy Sheehy (CnaG)	Jasper Wolfe (Ind.)	Timothy O'Donovan (FP)
6th	1927 (Sep)	Timothy J. Murphy (Lab)	Thomas Mullins (FF)	Timothy Sheehy (CnaG)	Jasper Wolfe (Ind.)	Timothy O'Donovan (FP)
7th	1932	Timothy J. Murphy (Lab)	Raphael Keyes (FF)	Eamonn O'Neill (CnaG)	Jasper Wolfe (Ind.)	Timothy O'Donovan (FP)
8th	1933	Timothy J. Murphy (Lab)	Tom Hales (FF)	Eamonn O'Neill (CnaG)	James Burke (CnaG)	Timothy O'Donovan (NCP)
9th	1937	Timothy J. Murphy (Lab)	Timothy O'Sullivan (FF)	Daniel O'Leary (FG)	Eamonn O'Neill (FG)	Timothy O'Donovan (FG)
10th	1938	Timothy J. Murphy (Lab)	Timothy O'Sullivan (FF)	Seán Buckley (FF)	Eamonn O'Neill (FG)	Timothy O'Donovan (FG)
11th	1943	Timothy J. Murphy (Lab)	Timothy O'Sullivan (FF)	Seán Buckley (FF)	Patrick O'Driscoll (Ind.)	Timothy O'Donovan (FG)
12th	1944	Timothy J. Murphy (Lab)	Timothy O'Sullivan (FF)	Seán Buckley (FF)	Patrick O'Driscoll (Ind.)	Eamonn O'Neill (FG)
13th	1948	Timothy J. Murphy (Lab)	Timothy O'Sullivan (FF)	Seán Collins (FG)	3 seats 1948–1961	
13th	1949 by-election	William J. Murphy (Lab)	Timothy O'Sullivan (FF)	Seán Collins (FG)	3 seats 1948–1961	
14th	1951	Michael Pat Murphy (Lab)	Timothy O'Sullivan (FF)	Seán Collins (FG)	3 seats 1948–1961	
15th	1954	Michael Pat Murphy (Lab)	Edward Cotter (FF)	Seán Collins (FG)	3 seats 1948–1961	
16th	1957	Michael Pat Murphy (Lab)	Edward Cotter (FF)	Florence Wycherley (Ind.)	3 seats 1948–1961	
17th	1961	Constituency abolished. See Cork South-West				
