= Sean Nolan =

Sean Nolan may refer to:

- Seán Nolan, Irish Sinn Féin politician
- Sean Nolan (water polo), American water polo player

== See also ==
- Sean Nolin, American baseball pitcher
