= Daniel Byrne (disambiguation) =

Daniel Byrne (1885–1952) was an Irish politician.

Daniel Byrne may also refer to:

- Daniel Byrne of the Leicester baronets
- Danny Byrne (born 1984), English footballer
