= Justin McKenna =

Irish politician (1896–1950)

Teachta Dála
- In office May 1921 – June 1922
- Constituency: Louth–Meath

Personal details
- Born: 9 June 1896 Mullagh, County Cavan, Ireland
- Died: 23 March 1950 (aged 53) Kells, County Meath, Ireland
- Party: Sinn Féin
- Education: University College Dublin

Justin McKenna (9 June 1896 – 23 March 1950) was an Irish politician and lawyer.

Born in Mullagh, County Cavan, McKenna's shopkeeper father, Thomas P. McKenna, was prominent in public life having held the offices of Chairman of Cavan County Council, founding Chairman of the Cavan County Board of the GAA, and a member of the Governing Body of University College Dublin (UCD). His mother was Sarah Clinton.

Educated at St Patrick's College, Cavan, McKenna went on to be enrolled as a law student at UCD. While there he became active in the military struggle.

During a visit home he was arrested on 26 November 1920 and later charged with possession of ammunition and seditious materials. He was held for a time at Arbour Hill Prison he was subsequently interned at the Rath Camp in the Curragh.

He was released on 8 August 1921 having been elected unopposed for Sinn Féin as a TD to the Second Dáil at the 1921 elections for the Louth–Meath constituency. He supported the Anglo-Irish Treaty and voted in favour of it. He stood as a pro-Treaty Sinn Féin candidate at the 1922 general election but was not elected.

Following the formation of the Irish Free State, McKenna became County Meath's first State Solicitor, a role which involves being the top appellate advocate, amongst other duties. After public life he continued in private practice in Kells, County Meath, until his death following a stroke on 23 July 1950.

In November 1932 he married Brigid Lynch in Dublin.

Dáil	Election	Deputy (Party)	Deputy (Party)	Deputy (Party)	Deputy (Party)	Deputy (Party)
2nd	1921	Justin McKenna (SF)	Eamonn Duggan (SF)	Peter Hughes (SF)	James Murphy (SF)	John J. O'Kelly (SF)
3rd	1922	Cathal O'Shannon (Lab)	Eamonn Duggan (PT-SF)	Peter Hughes (PT-SF)	James Murphy (PT-SF)	John J. O'Kelly (AT-SF)
4th	1923	Constituency abolished. See Louth and Meath				
