= Cork Mid, North, South, South East and West =

Dáil constituency (1921–1923)

- Former Dáil constituency
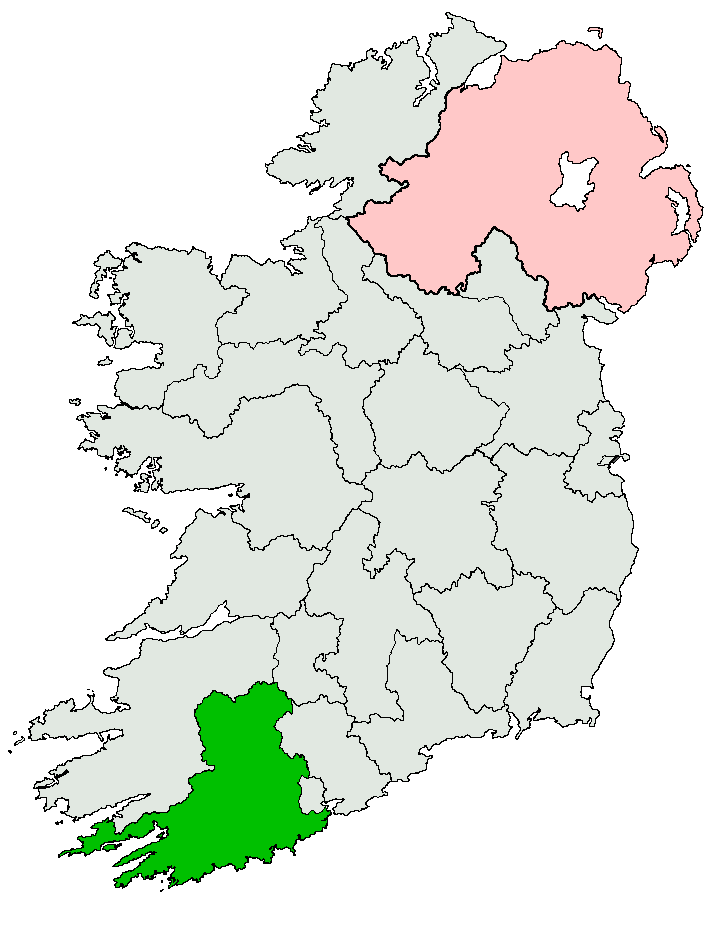
- Location of Cork Mid, North, South, South East and West within Ireland

Former constituency
- Created: 1921
- Abolished: 1923
- Seats: 8
- Local government area: County Cork
- Created from: Mid Cork; North Cork; South Cork; South East Cork; West Cork
- Replaced by: Cork North; Cork West

Cork Mid, North, South, South East and West was a parliamentary constituency represented in Dáil Éireann, the lower house of the Irish parliament or Oireachtas from 1921 to 1923. The constituency elected 8 deputies (Teachtaí Dála, commonly known as TDs) to the Dáil, on the system of proportional representation by means of the single transferable vote (PR-STV).

== History and boundaries ==
The constituency was created in 1921 as an 8-seat constituency, under the Government of Ireland Act 1920, for the 1921 general election to the House of Commons of Southern Ireland, whose members formed the Second Dáil. It succeeded the constituencies of Cork Mid, Cork North, Cork South, Cork South East and Cork West which were used to elect the Members of the 1st Dáil and earlier UK House of Commons members.

The constituency covered most of County Cork except for Cork city and the northern eastern and eastern parts of the county.

It was abolished under the Electoral Act 1923, when it was replaced by the new Cork North and Cork West constituencies, which were first used in the 1923 general election for the 4th Dáil.

== TDs ==
Teachtaí Dála (TDs) for Cork Mid, North, South, South East and West 1921–1923
Key to parties: SF = Sinn Féin; AT-SF = Sinn Féin (Anti-Treaty); PT-SF = Sinn Féin (Pro-Treaty); Lab = Labour; FP = Farmers' Party
Dáil	Election	Deputy (Party)	Deputy (Party)	Deputy (Party)	Deputy (Party)	Deputy (Party)	Deputy (Party)	Deputy (Party)	Deputy (Party)
2nd	1921	Seán MacSwiney (SF)	Seán Nolan (SF)	Seán Moylan (SF)	Daniel Corkery (SF)	Michael Collins (SF)	Seán Hales (SF)	Seán Hayes (SF)	Patrick O'Keeffe (SF)
3rd	1922	Michael Bradley (Lab)	Thomas Nagle (Lab)	Seán Moylan (AT-SF)	Daniel Corkery (AT-SF)	Michael Collins (PT-SF)	Seán Hales (PT-SF)	Seán Hayes (PT-SF)	Daniel Vaughan (FP)
4th	1923	Constituency abolished. See Cork North and Cork West							

Note: The columns in this table are used only for presentational purposes, and no significance should be attached to the order of columns. For details of the order in which seats were won at each election, see the detailed results of that election.

The constituency's most notable TD was Michael Collins, who was Minister for Finance in the First Dáil of 1919, Director of Intelligence for the IRA, and member of the Irish delegation during the Anglo-Irish Treaty negotiations. He was killed during the Civil War in an ambush on 22 August 1922 near the village of Béal na Bláth.

== Elections ==
*: Outgoing TD

=== 1922 general election ===
In Cork Mid, North, South, South East and West, Sinn Féin's eight candidates (all outgoing TDs from the Second Dáil) were joined by two from the Labour Party and two from the Farmers' Party. Pro-Treaty Sinn Féin candidates won a combined total of 45.75% of the first-preference votes, with their anti-Treaty counterparts winning a combined 23.03%. Both Labour Party candidates were elected, along with one Farmers' Party candidate, unseating two anti-Treaty Sinn Féin TDs and one pro-Treaty TD.

1922 general election: Cork Mid, North, South, South East and West
Party	Candidate	FPv%	Count								
Party	Candidate	FPv%	1	2	3	4	5	6	7	8	9
Sinn Féin (Pro-Treaty)	Michael Collins	31.2	17,106								
Labour	Michael Bradley	13.7	7,513								
Farmers' Party	Daniel Vaughan	10.6	5,811	6,947							
Sinn Féin (Anti-Treaty)	Seán Moylan	8.4	4,585	4,874	4,921	5,010	5,070	5,085	5,152	5,388	6,146
Sinn Féin (Pro-Treaty)	Seán Hales	8.0	4,374	8,626							
Sinn Féin (Anti-Treaty)	Daniel Corkery	6.5	3,577	5,138	5,357	5,557	5,628	5,646	5,803	5,968	6,344
Sinn Féin (Anti-Treaty)	Seán MacSwiney	5.9	3,235	3,429	3,467	3,600	3,646	3,672	3,752	4,468	4,710
Labour	Thomas Nagle	5.9	3,224	3,844	4,792	4,963	4,994	5,014	5,059	5,133	5,528
Sinn Féin (Pro-Treaty)	Seán Hayes	4.9	2,676	4,494	4,619	6,305					
Sinn Féin (Anti-Treaty)	Seán Nolan	2.2	1,226	1,328	1,345	1,374	1,388	1,394	1,434		
Sinn Féin (Pro-Treaty)	Patrick O'Keeffe	1.7	914	1,672	1,692	1,833	2,228	2,341	2,716	2,854	
Farmers' Party	Peadar Ó hAunracain	1.0	561	847	856	943	1,183	1,200			
Electorate: 88,053 Valid: 54,802 Quota: 6,090 Turnout: 62.2%

=== 1921 general election ===
At the 1921 general election to the Second Dáil, no seats were contested in the 26 counties which became the Irish Free State. In Cork Mid, North, South, South East and West only eight candidates were nominated for the constituency's eight seats. No ballot was needed, and all eight Sinn Féin candidates were elected unopposed after the close of nominations on 24 May 1921. The 8 TDs elected are listed here in alphabetical order:

1921 general election: Cork Mid, North, South, South East and West (uncontested)
Party	Candidate
Sinn Féin	Michael Collins (Note: Michael Collins was elected to the Dáil both for Cork Mid, North, South, South East and West and also for Armagh. He chose to sit in the Second Dáil for the Cork constituency.)
Sinn Féin	Daniel Corkery
Sinn Féin	Seán Hales
Sinn Féin	Seán Hayes
Sinn Féin	Seán MacSwiney
Sinn Féin	Seán Moylan
Sinn Féin	Seán Nolan
Sinn Féin	Patrick O'Keeffe

== See also ==
- Dáil constituencies
- Politics of the Republic of Ireland
- Historic Dáil constituencies
- Elections in the Republic of Ireland
