= Peter Hughes (Irish politician) =

Irish politician (1878–1954)

Minister for Defence
- In office 21 November 1924 – 23 June 1927
- President: W. T. Cosgrave
- Preceded by: W. T. Cosgrave (acting)
- Succeeded by: Desmond FitzGerald

Teachta Dála
- In office August 1923 – June 1927
- Constituency: Louth
- In office May 1921 – August 1923
- Constituency: Louth–Meath

Personal details
- Born: 1878 County Louth, Ireland
- Died: 24 June 1954 (aged 75–76) Dundalk, County Louth, Ireland
- Party: Sinn Féin; Cumann na nGaedheal
- Spouse: Lily McKevitt
- Children: 4

British Army intelligence file for Peter Hughes

Peter Hughes (1878 – 24 June 1954) was an Irish politician. A publican and a farmer, he was a member of Louth County Council and Dundalk Urban District Council. He was first elected to Dáil Éireann at the 1921 general election as a Sinn Féin Teachta Dála (TD) for the Louth–Meath constituency.

As a supporter of the Anglo-Irish Treaty of 1921 he later went on to join Cumann na nGaedheal. He was appointed to the Cabinet in 1924, serving as Minister for Defence until 1927. Although he was a member of the government he lost his Dáil seat at the June 1927 general election, and failed to be elected in the two subsequent general elections.

He died on the 24 June 1954, at Mount Street, Dundalk, aged 75. He was predeceased by his wife, Lily McKevitt, with whom he had two sons and two daughters. He was buried at St Patrick's, Dundalk cemetery on 28 June 1954.

Political offices
Preceded by W. T. Cosgrave	Minister for Defence; 1924–1927	Succeeded by Desmond FitzGerald

Dáil	Election	Deputy (Party)	Deputy (Party)	Deputy (Party)	Deputy (Party)	Deputy (Party)
2nd	1921	Justin McKenna (SF)	Eamonn Duggan (SF)	Peter Hughes (SF)	James Murphy (SF)	John J. O'Kelly (SF)
3rd	1922	Cathal O'Shannon (Lab)	Eamonn Duggan (PT-SF)	Peter Hughes (PT-SF)	James Murphy (PT-SF)	John J. O'Kelly (AT-SF)
4th	1923	Constituency abolished. See Louth and Meath				

Dáil	Election	Deputy (Party)	Deputy (Party)	Deputy (Party)	Deputy (Party)	Deputy (Party)
4th	1923	Frank Aiken (Rep)	Peter Hughes (CnaG)	James Murphy (CnaG)	3 seats until 1977	
5th	1927 (Jun)	Frank Aiken (FF)	James Coburn (NL)	James Murphy (CnaG)	3 seats until 1977	
6th	1927 (Sep)	Frank Aiken (FF)	James Coburn (NL)	James Murphy (CnaG)	3 seats until 1977	
7th	1932	Frank Aiken (FF)	James Coburn (Ind.)	James Murphy (CnaG)	3 seats until 1977	
8th	1933	Frank Aiken (FF)	James Coburn (Ind.)	James Murphy (CnaG)	3 seats until 1977	
9th	1937	Frank Aiken (FF)	James Coburn (FG)	Laurence Walsh (FF)	3 seats until 1977	
10th	1938	Frank Aiken (FF)	James Coburn (FG)	Laurence Walsh (FF)	3 seats until 1977	
11th	1943	Frank Aiken (FF)	James Coburn (FG)	Roddy Connolly (Lab)	3 seats until 1977	
12th	1944	Frank Aiken (FF)	James Coburn (FG)	Laurence Walsh (FF)	3 seats until 1977	
13th	1948	Frank Aiken (FF)	James Coburn (FG)	Roddy Connolly (Lab)	3 seats until 1977	
14th	1951	Frank Aiken (FF)	James Coburn (FG)	Laurence Walsh (FF)	3 seats until 1977	
14th	1954 by-election	Frank Aiken (FF)	George Coburn (FG)	Laurence Walsh (FF)	3 seats until 1977	
15th	1954	Frank Aiken (FF)	George Coburn (FG)	Paddy Donegan (FG)	3 seats until 1977	
16th	1957	Frank Aiken (FF)	George Coburn (FG)	Pádraig Faulkner (Note: Faulker served as Ceann Comhairle in the 21st Dáil from 1977 to 1981, and was returned automatically at the 1981 election.) (FF)	3 seats until 1977	
17th	1961	Frank Aiken (FF)	Paddy Donegan (FG)	Pádraig Faulkner (FF)	3 seats until 1977	
18th	1965	Frank Aiken (FF)	Paddy Donegan (FG)	Pádraig Faulkner (FF)	3 seats until 1977	
19th	1969	Frank Aiken (FF)	Paddy Donegan (FG)	Pádraig Faulkner (FF)	3 seats until 1977	
20th	1973	Joseph Farrell (FF)	Paddy Donegan (FG)	Pádraig Faulkner (FF)	3 seats until 1977	
21st	1977	Joseph Farrell (FF)	Paddy Donegan (FG)	Pádraig Faulkner (FF)	Eddie Filgate (FF)	4 seats 1977–2011
22nd	1981	Paddy Agnew (AHB)	Bernard Markey (FG)	Pádraig Faulkner (FF)	Eddie Filgate (FF)	4 seats 1977–2011
23rd	1982 (Feb)	Thomas Bellew (FF)	Bernard Markey (FG)	Pádraig Faulkner (FF)	Eddie Filgate (FF)	4 seats 1977–2011
24th	1982 (Nov)	Michael Bell (Lab)	Brendan McGahon (FG)	Pádraig Faulkner (FF)	Séamus Kirk (Note: Kirk served as Ceann Comhairle in the 30th Dáil from 2009 to 2011, and was returned automatically at the 2011 election.) (FF)	4 seats 1977–2011
25th	1987	Michael Bell (Lab)	Brendan McGahon (FG)	Dermot Ahern (FF)	Séamus Kirk (FF)	4 seats 1977–2011
26th	1989	Michael Bell (Lab)	Brendan McGahon (FG)	Dermot Ahern (FF)	Séamus Kirk (FF)	4 seats 1977–2011
27th	1992	Michael Bell (Lab)	Brendan McGahon (FG)	Dermot Ahern (FF)	Séamus Kirk (FF)	4 seats 1977–2011
28th	1997	Michael Bell (Lab)	Brendan McGahon (FG)	Dermot Ahern (FF)	Séamus Kirk (FF)	4 seats 1977–2011
29th	2002	Arthur Morgan (SF)	Fergus O'Dowd (FG)	Dermot Ahern (FF)	Séamus Kirk (FF)	4 seats 1977–2011
30th	2007	Arthur Morgan (SF)	Fergus O'Dowd (FG)	Dermot Ahern (FF)	Séamus Kirk (FF)	4 seats 1977–2011
31st	2011	Gerry Adams (SF)	Fergus O'Dowd (FG)	Ged Nash (Lab)	Séamus Kirk (FF)	Peter Fitzpatrick (FG)
32nd	2016	Gerry Adams (SF)	Fergus O'Dowd (FG)	Declan Breathnach (FF)	Imelda Munster (SF)	Peter Fitzpatrick (FG)
33rd	2020	Ruairí Ó Murchú (SF)	Fergus O'Dowd (FG)	Ged Nash (Lab)	Imelda Munster (SF)	Peter Fitzpatrick (Ind.)
34th	2024	Ruairí Ó Murchú (SF)	Paula Butterly (FG)	Ged Nash (Lab)	Joanna Byrne (SF)	Erin McGreehan (FF)
