= Louth–Meath =

Dáil constituency (1921–1923)

- Former Dáil constituency
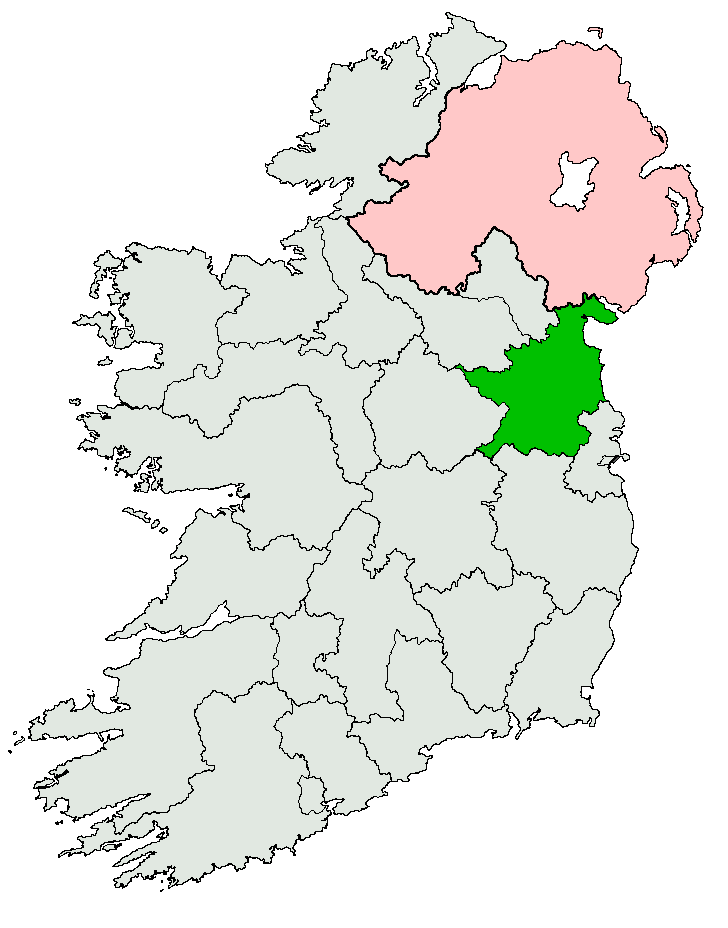
- Location of Louth–Meath within Ireland

Former constituency
- Created: 1921
- Abolished: 1923
- Seats: 5
- Local government areas: County Louth; County Meath
- Replaced by: Louth; Meath

Louth–Meath was a parliamentary constituency represented in Dáil Éireann, the lower house of the Irish parliament or Oireachtas from 1921 to 1923. The constituency elected 5 deputies (Teachtaí Dála, commonly known as TDs) to the Dáil, on the system of proportional representation by means of the single transferable vote (PR-STV).

== History and boundaries ==
The constituency was created in 1921, under the Government of Ireland Act 1920, for the 1921 general election to the House of Commons of Southern Ireland, whose members formed the Second Dáil. It was used again for the 1922 general election to the 3rd Dáil. It covered County Louth and County Meath.

Louth–Meath was abolished under the Electoral Act 1923, and replaced by the two new constituencies of Louth and Meath.

== TDs ==
Teachtaí Dála (TDs) for Louth–Meath 1921–1923
Key to parties: Lab = Labour; SF = Sinn Féin; AT-SF = Sinn Féin (Anti-Treaty); PT-SF = Sinn Féin (Pro-Treaty)
Dáil	Election	Deputy (Party)	Deputy (Party)	Deputy (Party)	Deputy (Party)	Deputy (Party)
2nd	1921	Justin McKenna (SF)	Eamonn Duggan (SF)	Peter Hughes (SF)	James Murphy (SF)	John J. O'Kelly (SF)
3rd	1922	Cathal O'Shannon (Lab)	Eamonn Duggan (PT-SF)	Peter Hughes (PT-SF)	James Murphy (PT-SF)	John J. O'Kelly (AT-SF)
4th	1923	Constituency abolished. See Louth and Meath				

Note: The columns in this table are used only for presentational purposes, and no significance should be attached to the order of columns. For details of the order in which seats were won at each election, see the detailed results of that election.

== Elections ==
*: Outgoing TD

=== 1922 general election ===
1922 general election: Louth–Meath
Party	Candidate	FPv%	Count		
Party	Candidate	FPv%	1	2	3
Labour	Cathal O'Shannon	38.3	13,994		
Sinn Féin (Pro-Treaty)	Eamonn Duggan	19.2	6,990		
Sinn Féin (Anti-Treaty)	John J. O'Kelly	15.7	5,733	8,602	
Sinn Féin (Pro-Treaty)	Peter Hughes	11.7	4,282	6,112	
Sinn Féin (Pro-Treaty)	James Murphy	9.2	3,367	5,293	6,222
Sinn Féin (Pro-Treaty)	Justin McKenna	5.8	2,135	3,420	3,912
Electorate: 62,505 Valid: 36,501 Quota: 6,084 Turnout: 58.4%

=== 1921 general election ===
1921 general election: Louth–Meath (uncontested)
Party	Candidate
Sinn Féin	Eamonn Duggan
Sinn Féin	Peter Hughes
Sinn Féin	Justin McKenna
Sinn Féin	James Murphy
Sinn Féin	John J. O'Kelly

== See also ==
- Dáil constituencies
- Politics of the Republic of Ireland
- Historic Dáil constituencies
- Elections in the Republic of Ireland
