= Michael Hennessy =

Irish politician (1867–1942)

Teachta Dála
- In office August 1923 – February 1932
- Constituency: Cork East
- In office June 1922 – August 1923
- Constituency: Cork East and North East

Personal details
- Born: County Cork, Ireland
- Died: County Cork, Ireland
- Party: Businessmen's Party; Cumann na nGaedheal

Michael Joseph Hennessy was an Irish politician and businessman. He was first elected to Dáil Éireann as a Businessmen's Party Teachta Dála (TD) for Cork East and North East at the 1922 general election. He was elected as a Cumann na nGaedheal TD for Cork East at the 1923, June 1927 and September 1927 general elections. He lost his seat at the 1932 general election.

Hennessy lived at 11 Rahilly Street, Cobh (formerly King Street). In June 1922 the Bishop of Cloyne Robert Browne, contributed £20 each to the election funds of Hennessy and John Dinneen, Commercial and Farmer pro-Treaty candidates respectively for the Cork East and North East constituency.

Dáil	Election	Deputy (Party)	Deputy (Party)	Deputy (Party)
2nd	1921	Séamus Fitzgerald (SF)	Thomas Hunter (SF)	David Kent (SF)
3rd	1922	John Dinneen (FP)	Michael Hennessy (BP)	David Kent (AT-SF)
4th	1923	Constituency abolished. See Cork East and Cork North		

Dáil	Election	Deputy (Party)	Deputy (Party)	Deputy (Party)	Deputy (Party)	Deputy (Party)
4th	1923	John Daly (Ind.)	Michael Hennessy (CnaG)	David Kent (Rep)	John Dinneen (FP)	Thomas O'Mahony (CnaG)
4th	1924 by-election	John Daly (Ind.)	Michael Hennessy (CnaG)	David Kent (Rep)	John Dinneen (FP)	Michael K. Noonan (CnaG)
5th	1927 (Jun)	John Daly (Ind.)	Michael Hennessy (CnaG)	David Kent (SF)	David O'Gorman (FP)	Martin Corry (FF)
6th	1927 (Sep)	John Daly (CnaG)	Michael Hennessy (CnaG)	William Kent (FF)	Edmond Carey (CnaG)	Martin Corry (FF)
7th	1932	John Daly (CnaG)	William Broderick (CnaG)	Brook Brasier (Ind.)	Patrick Murphy (FF)	Martin Corry (FF)
8th	1933	Patrick Daly (CnaG)	William Broderick (CnaG)	William Kent (NCP)	Patrick Murphy (FF)	Martin Corry (FF)
9th	1937	Constituency abolished				

Dáil	Election	Deputy (Party)	Deputy (Party)	Deputy (Party)
13th	1948	Martin Corry (FF)	Patrick O'Gorman (FG)	Seán Keane (Lab)
14th	1951	Martin Corry (FF)	Patrick O'Gorman (FG)	Seán Keane (Lab)
14th	1953 by-election	Martin Corry (FF)	Patrick O'Gorman (FG)	Richard Barry (FG)
15th	1954	Martin Corry (FF)	John Moher (FF)	Richard Barry (FG)
16th	1957	Martin Corry (FF)	John Moher (FF)	Richard Barry (FG)
17th	1961	Constituency abolished		

Dáil	Election	Deputy (Party)	Deputy (Party)	Deputy (Party)	Deputy (Party)
22nd	1981	Carey Joyce (FF)	Myra Barry (FG)	Patrick Hegarty (FG)	Joe Sherlock (SF–WP)
23rd	1982 (Feb)	Michael Ahern (FF)	Myra Barry (FG)	Patrick Hegarty (FG)	Joe Sherlock (SF–WP)
24th	1982 (Nov)	Michael Ahern (FF)	Myra Barry (FG)	Patrick Hegarty (FG)	Ned O'Keeffe (FF)
25th	1987	Michael Ahern (FF)	Joe Sherlock (WP)	Patrick Hegarty (FG)	Ned O'Keeffe (FF)
26th	1989	Michael Ahern (FF)	Joe Sherlock (WP)	Paul Bradford (FG)	Ned O'Keeffe (FF)
27th	1992	Michael Ahern (FF)	John Mulvihill (Lab)	Paul Bradford (FG)	Ned O'Keeffe (FF)
28th	1997	Michael Ahern (FF)	David Stanton (FG)	Paul Bradford (FG)	Ned O'Keeffe (FF)
29th	2002	Michael Ahern (FF)	David Stanton (FG)	Joe Sherlock (Lab)	Ned O'Keeffe (FF)
30th	2007	Michael Ahern (FF)	David Stanton (FG)	Seán Sherlock (Lab)	Ned O'Keeffe (FF)
31st	2011	Sandra McLellan (SF)	David Stanton (FG)	Seán Sherlock (Lab)	Tom Barry (FG)
32nd	2016	Pat Buckley (SF)	David Stanton (FG)	Seán Sherlock (Lab)	Kevin O'Keeffe (FF)
33rd	2020	Pat Buckley (SF)	David Stanton (FG)	Seán Sherlock (Lab)	James O'Connor (FF)
34th	2024	Pat Buckley (SF)	Noel McCarthy (FG)	Liam Quaide (SD)	James O'Connor (FF)
