= Thomas Nagle =

Irish politician

Teachta Dála
- In office August 1923 – June 1927
- Constituency: Cork North
- In office June 1922 – August 1923
- Constituency: Cork Mid, North, South, South East and West

Personal details
- Born: County Cork, Ireland
- Party: Labour Party

Thomas Alexander Nagle was an Irish Labour Party politician. He was elected to Dáil Éireann as a Labour Party Teachta Dála (TD) for the Cork Mid, North, South, South East and West constituency at the 1922 general election.

He was re-elected at the 1923 general election for the Cork North constituency. He lost his seat at the June 1927 general election, having stood in the Dublin South constituency.

Dáil	Election	Deputy (Party)	Deputy (Party)	Deputy (Party)	Deputy (Party)	Deputy (Party)	Deputy (Party)	Deputy (Party)	Deputy (Party)
2nd	1921	Seán MacSwiney (SF)	Seán Nolan (SF)	Seán Moylan (SF)	Daniel Corkery (SF)	Michael Collins (SF)	Seán Hales (SF)	Seán Hayes (SF)	Patrick O'Keeffe (SF)
3rd	1922	Michael Bradley (Lab)	Thomas Nagle (Lab)	Seán Moylan (AT-SF)	Daniel Corkery (AT-SF)	Michael Collins (PT-SF)	Seán Hales (PT-SF)	Seán Hayes (PT-SF)	Daniel Vaughan (FP)
4th	1923	Constituency abolished. See Cork North and Cork West							

Dáil	Election	Deputy (Party)	Deputy (Party)	Deputy (Party)	Deputy (Party)
4th	1923	Daniel Corkery (Rep)	Daniel Vaughan (FP)	Thomas Nagle (Lab)	3 seats 1923–1937
5th	1927 (Jun)	Daniel Corkery (Ind.)	Daniel Vaughan (FP)	Timothy Quill (Lab)	3 seats 1923–1937
6th	1927 (Sep)	Daniel Corkery (FF)	Daniel Vaughan (FP)	Daniel O'Leary (CnaG)	3 seats 1923–1937
7th	1932	Seán Moylan (FF)	Daniel Vaughan (FP)	Daniel O'Leary (CnaG)	3 seats 1923–1937
8th	1933	Seán Moylan (FF)	Daniel Corkery (FF)	Daniel O'Leary (CnaG)	3 seats 1923–1937
9th	1937	Seán Moylan (FF)	Patrick Daly (FG)	Timothy Linehan (FG)	Con Meaney (FF)
10th	1938	Seán Moylan (FF)	Patrick Daly (FG)	Timothy Linehan (FG)	Con Meaney (FF)
11th	1943	Seán Moylan (FF)	Patrick Halliden (CnaT)	Timothy Linehan (FG)	Leo Skinner (FF)
12th	1944	Seán Moylan (FF)	Patrick Halliden (CnaT)	Patrick McAuliffe (Lab)	Leo Skinner (FF)
13th	1948	Seán Moylan (FF)	Patrick Halliden (CnaT)	Patrick McAuliffe (Lab)	3 seats 1948–1961
14th	1951	Seán Moylan (FF)	Denis O'Sullivan (FG)	Patrick McAuliffe (Lab)	3 seats 1948–1961
15th	1954	Seán Moylan (FF)	Denis O'Sullivan (FG)	Patrick McAuliffe (Lab)	3 seats 1948–1961
16th	1957	Batt Donegan (FF)	Denis O'Sullivan (FG)	Patrick McAuliffe (Lab)	3 seats 1948–1961
17th	1961	Constituency abolished. See Cork North-East and Cork Mid			
