= Séamus Fitzgerald =

Irish politician (1896–1972)

Teachta Dála
- In office June 1943 – May 1944
- Constituency: Cork Borough
- In office May 1921 – June 1922
- Constituency: Cork East and North East

Senator
- In office 12 December 1934 – 29 May 1936

Personal details
- Born: James Fitzgerald; 21 August 1896 Cobh, County Cork, Ireland
- Died: 23 July 1972 (aged 75) County Cork, Ireland
- Party: Sinn Féin; Fianna Fáil
- Spouse: Mary Harrington (m. 1927)
- Children: 3

Séamus Fitzgerald (21 August 1896 – 23 July 1972) was an Irish politician. He was elected unopposed as a Sinn Féin Teachta Dála (TD) to the Second Dáil at the 1921 elections for the Cork East and North East constituency.

Fitzgerald was born in Cobh (then known as Queenstown) in 1896. He joined the Irish Volunteers in 1914 and was mobilised in Cork in preparation for the Easter Rising in 1916. When the Rising failed to spread beyond Dublin and some other limited actions, Fitzgerald and many of his Cork comrades was interned in Britain. After the amnesty for prisoners he rejoined what had now become the Irish Republican Army (IRA) in Cobh and also became active in the Sinn Féin party. He was elected a member of the town's first republican Urban District Council (later Cobh Town Council) at the 1919 local elections and was elected chairman at its first meeting.

He opposed the Anglo-Irish Treaty and voted against it. Fitzgerald felt that those people who were against the ongoing struggle for Irish independence favored the treaty while "those who bore the brunt of the fighting were almost unanimously against the treaty, war or no war." He stood as an anti-Treaty Sinn Féin candidate at the 1922 general election but was not elected. He joined Fianna Fáil in 1926 shortly after its foundation and was to remain a prominent member of the party in the Cork area for the next 50 years until his death. He was elected to the Irish Free State Seanad in 1934 and served until it was abolished in 1936. He stood in several elections for that party in both Cork East and Cork City but was only successful on one occasion when elected to the short-lived 11th Dáil as a Fianna Fáil Teachta Dála (TD) for the Cork Borough constituency at the 1943 general election. He lost his seat at the 1944 general election.

He married Mary Harrington in 1927, and they had three children. Fitzgerald owned a local business in Cobh and was an active member of the local Chamber of Commerce as well as Cork Harbour Commissioners (now the Port of Cork Company). He held several directorships in local companies. Fitzgerald died in 1972.

Dáil	Election	Deputy (Party)	Deputy (Party)	Deputy (Party)
2nd	1921	Séamus Fitzgerald (SF)	Thomas Hunter (SF)	David Kent (SF)
3rd	1922	John Dinneen (FP)	Michael Hennessy (BP)	David Kent (AT-SF)
4th	1923	Constituency abolished. See Cork East and Cork North		

Dáil	Election	Deputy (Party)	Deputy (Party)	Deputy (Party)	Deputy (Party)	Deputy (Party)
2nd	1921	Liam de Róiste (SF)	Mary MacSwiney (SF)	Donal O'Callaghan (SF)	J. J. Walsh (SF)	4 seats 1921–1923
3rd	1922	Liam de Róiste (PT-SF)	Mary MacSwiney (AT-SF)	Robert Day (Lab)	J. J. Walsh (PT-SF)	4 seats 1921–1923
4th	1923	Richard Beamish (Ind.)	Mary MacSwiney (Rep)	Andrew O'Shaughnessy (Ind.)	J. J. Walsh (CnaG)	Alfred O'Rahilly (CnaG)
4th	1924 by-election	Richard Beamish (Ind.)	Mary MacSwiney (Rep)	Andrew O'Shaughnessy (Ind.)	J. J. Walsh (CnaG)	Michael Egan (CnaG)
5th	1927 (Jun)	John Horgan (NL)	Seán French (FF)	Richard Anthony (Lab)	J. J. Walsh (CnaG)	Barry Egan (CnaG)
6th	1927 (Sep)	W. T. Cosgrave (CnaG)	Seán French (FF)	Richard Anthony (Lab)	Hugo Flinn (FF)	Barry Egan (CnaG)
7th	1932	W. T. Cosgrave (CnaG)	Thomas Dowdall (FF)	Richard Anthony (Ind.)	Hugo Flinn (FF)	William Desmond (CnaG)
8th	1933	W. T. Cosgrave (CnaG)	Thomas Dowdall (FF)	Richard Anthony (Ind.)	Hugo Flinn (FF)	William Desmond (CnaG)
9th	1937	W. T. Cosgrave (FG)	Thomas Dowdall (FF)	Richard Anthony (Ind.)	Hugo Flinn (FF)	4 seats 1937–1948
10th	1938	W. T. Cosgrave (FG)	Thomas Dowdall (FF)	James Hickey (Lab)	Hugo Flinn (FF)	4 seats 1937–1948
11th	1943	W. T. Cosgrave (FG)	Frank Daly (FF)	Richard Anthony (Ind.)	Séamus Fitzgerald (FF)	4 seats 1937–1948
12th	1944	William Dwyer (Ind.)	Frank Daly (FF)	Richard Anthony (Ind.)	Walter Furlong (FF)	4 seats 1937–1948
12th	1946 by-election	Patrick McGrath (FF)	Frank Daly (FF)	Richard Anthony (Ind.)	Walter Furlong (FF)	4 seats 1937–1948
13th	1948	Patrick McGrath (FF)	Michael Sheehan (Ind.)	James Hickey (NLP)	Jack Lynch (FF)	Thomas F. O'Higgins (FG)
14th	1951	Patrick McGrath (FF)	Seán McCarthy (FF)	James Hickey (Lab)	Jack Lynch (FF)	Thomas F. O'Higgins (FG)
14th	1954 by-election	Patrick McGrath (FF)	Seán McCarthy (FF)	James Hickey (Lab)	Jack Lynch (FF)	Stephen Barrett (FG)
15th	1954	Patrick McGrath (FF)	Anthony Barry (FG)	Seán Casey (Lab)	Jack Lynch (FF)	Stephen Barrett (FG)
15th	1956 by-election	John Galvin (FF)	Anthony Barry (FG)	Seán Casey (Lab)	Jack Lynch (FF)	Stephen Barrett (FG)
16th	1957	John Galvin (FF)	Gus Healy (FF)	Seán Casey (Lab)	Jack Lynch (FF)	Stephen Barrett (FG)
17th	1961	John Galvin (FF)	Anthony Barry (FG)	Seán Casey (Lab)	Jack Lynch (FF)	Stephen Barrett (FG)
17th	1964 by-election	Sheila Galvin (FF)	Anthony Barry (FG)	Seán Casey (Lab)	Jack Lynch (FF)	Stephen Barrett (FG)
18th	1965	Gus Healy (FF)	Pearse Wyse (FF)	Seán Casey (Lab)	Jack Lynch (FF)	Stephen Barrett (FG)
18th	1967 by-election	Gus Healy (FF)	Pearse Wyse (FF)	Seán French (FF)	Jack Lynch (FF)	Stephen Barrett (FG)
19th	1969	Constituency abolished. See Cork City North-West and Cork City South-East				
