= Cork East and North East =

Dáil constituency (1921–1923)

- Former Dáil constituency

Former constituency
- Created: 1921
- Abolished: 1923
- Seats: 3
- Local government area: County Cork
- Created from: East Cork; North East Cork
- Replaced by: Cork East; Cork North

Cork East and North East was a parliamentary constituency represented in Dáil Éireann, the lower house of the Irish parliament or Oireachtas from 1921 to 1923. The constituency elected 3 deputies (Teachtaí Dála, commonly known as TDs) to the Dáil, on the system of proportional representation by means of the single transferable vote (PR-STV).

== History and boundaries ==
The constituency was created in 1921 as a 3 seat-constituency under the Government of Ireland Act 1920, for the 1921 general election to the House of Commons of Southern Ireland, whose members formed the Second Dáil.

It succeeded the constituencies of Cork East and Cork North East which were used to elect the Members of the 1st Dáil and earlier UK House of Commons members.

It was abolished under the Electoral Act 1923, when it was replaced by the new Cork East and Cork North constituencies which were first used at the 1923 general election for the 4th Dáil.

It covered the northern eastern and eastern parts of County Cork.

== TDs ==
Teachtaí Dála (TDs) for Cork East and North East 1921–1923
Key to parties: BP = Businessmen's Party; FP = Farmers' Party; SF = Sinn Féin; AT-SF = Sinn Féin (Anti-Treaty)
Dáil	Election	Deputy (Party)	Deputy (Party)	Deputy (Party)
2nd	1921	Séamus Fitzgerald (SF)	Thomas Hunter (SF)	David Kent (SF)
3rd	1922	John Dinneen (FP)	Michael Hennessy (BP)	David Kent (AT-SF)
4th	1923	Constituency abolished. See Cork East and Cork North		

Note: The columns in this table are used only for presentational purposes, and no significance should be attached to the order of columns. For details of the order in which seats were won at each election, see the detailed results of that election.

== Elections ==
=== 1922 general election ===
1922 general election: Cork East and North East
Party	Candidate	FPv%	Count		
Party	Candidate	FPv%	1	2	3
Farmers' Party	John Dinneen	29.4	6,989		
Sinn Féin (Anti-Treaty)	David Kent	21.8	5,198	5,284	6,396
Businessmen's Party	Michael Hennessy	21.1	5,029	5,814	6,374
Sinn Féin (Anti-Treaty)	Thomas Hunter	14.3	3,409	3,445	4,926
Sinn Féin (Anti-Treaty)	Séamus Fitzgerald	13.4	3,189	3,317	
Electorate: 39,233 Valid: 23,814 Quota: 5,954 Turnout: 60.7%

=== 1921 general election ===
1921 general election: Cork East and North East (uncontested)
Party	Candidate
Sinn Féin	Séamus Fitzgerald
Sinn Féin	Thomas Hunter
Sinn Féin	David Kent

== See also ==
- Dáil constituencies
- Politics of the Republic of Ireland
- Historic Dáil constituencies
- Elections in the Republic of Ireland
