= Waterford–Tipperary East =

Dáil constituency (1921–1923)

- Former Dáil constituency
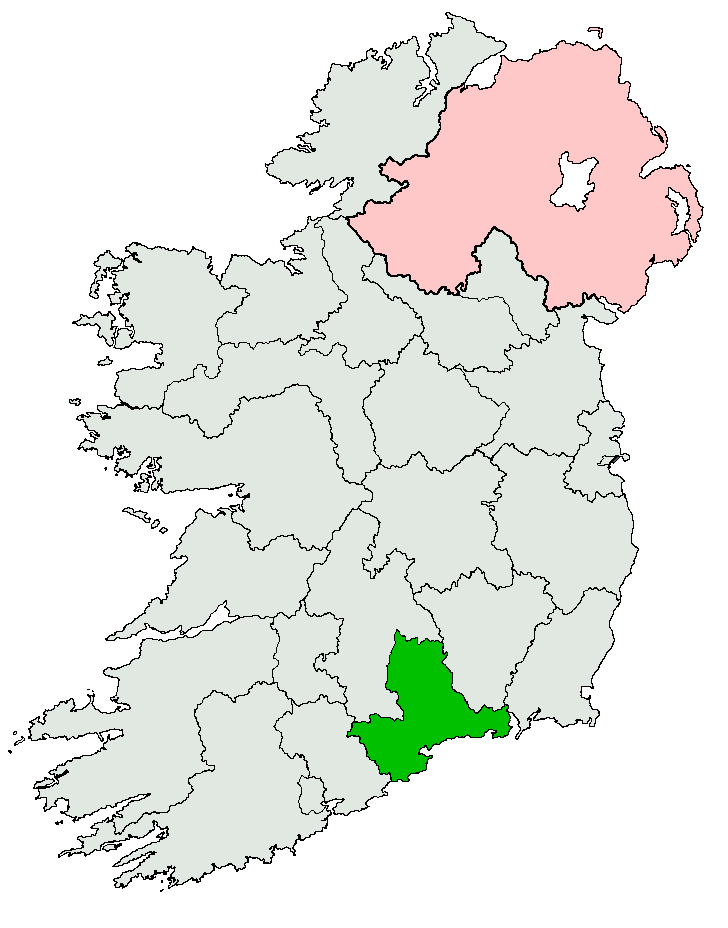
- Location of Waterford–Tipperary East within Ireland

Former constituency
- Created: 1921
- Abolished: 1923
- Seats: 5
- Local government area: County Waterford; County Tipperary
- Created from: East Tipperary; Waterford City; County Waterford
- Replaced by: Tipperary; Waterford

Waterford–Tipperary East was a parliamentary constituency represented in Dáil Éireann, the lower house of the Irish parliament or Oireachtas from 1921 to 1923. The constituency elected 5 deputies (Teachtaí Dála, commonly known as TDs) to the Dáil, on the system of proportional representation by means of the single transferable vote (PR-STV).

== History and boundaries ==
The constituency was created in 1921 as a 5-seat constituency, under the Government of Ireland Act 1920, for the 1921 general election to the House of Commons of Southern Ireland, whose members formed the Second Dáil.

It succeeded the constituencies of County Waterford, Waterford City and Tipperary East which were used to elect the Members of the 1st Dáil and earlier UK House of Commons members.

It was abolished under the Electoral Act 1923, when it was replaced by 2 new constituencies. East Tipperary became part of the new Tipperary constituency and Waterford became part of the new Waterford constituency.

It covered all of County Waterford and the eastern part of County Tipperary.

== TDs ==
Teachtaí Dála (TDs) for Waterford–Tipperary East 1921–1923
Key to parties: SF = Sinn Féin; AT-SF = Sinn Féin (Anti-Treaty); PT-SF = Sinn Féin (Pro-Treaty); Lab = Labour; FP = Farmers' Party
| Dáil | Election | Deputy (Party) | Deputy (Party) | Deputy (Party) | Deputy (Party) | Deputy (Party) |
| 2nd | 1921 | Eamon Dee (SF) | Frank Drohan (SF) | Cathal Brugha (SF) | Vincent White (SF) | Séumas Robinson (SF) |
| 3rd | 1922 | John Butler (Lab) | Nicholas Phelan (Lab) | Cathal Brugha (AT-SF) | Vincent White (PT-SF) | Daniel Byrne (FP) |
| 4th | 1923 | Constituency abolished. See Waterford and Tipperary | | | | |

Note: The columns in this table are used only for presentational purposes, and no significance should be attached to the order of columns. For details of the order in which seats were won at each election, see the detailed results of that election.

== Elections ==
*: Outgoing TD

=== 1922 general election ===
1922 general election: Waterford–Tipperary East
| Party | Candidate | FPv% | Count | | | | | |
| Party | Candidate | FPv% | 1 | 2 | 3 | 4 | 5 | 6 |
|---|---|---|---|---|---|---|---|---|
| Sinn Féin (Pro-Treaty) | Vincent White | 19.9 | 6,778 | | | | | |
| Labour | John Butler | 18.5 | 6,288 | | | | | |
| Sinn Féin (Anti-Treaty) | Cathal Brugha | 15.6 | 5,310 | 5,486 | 5,504 | 6,430 | | |
| Labour | Nicholas Phelan | 12.8 | 4,370 | 4,574 | 5,070 | 5,444 | 5,471 | 5,696 |
| Farmers' Party | Daniel Byrne | 10.0 | 3,405 | 3,485 | 3,504 | 3,616 | 3,630 | 5,732 |
| Sinn Féin (Anti-Treaty) | Dan Breen | 9.2 | 3,148 | 3,458 | 3,473 | 4,268 | 4,966 | 5,140 |
| Farmers' Party | Nicholas Fitzgerald | 7.2 | 2,466 | 2,596 | 2,616 | 2,813 | 2,824 | |
| Sinn Féin (Anti-Treaty) | Séumas Robinson | 4.2 | 1,436 | 1,514 | 1,517 | | | |
| Independent | John Mandeville | 1.7 | 583 | 665 | 691 | | | |
| Sinn Féin (Anti-Treaty) | Eamon Dee | 0.9 | 293 | 331 | 342 | | | |
Electorate: 54,308 Valid: 34,077 Quota: 5,680 Turnout: 62.8%

=== 1921 general election ===
At the 1921 general election, only five candidates were nominated in Waterford–Tipperary East. Since this was the same as the number of seats, no ballot was needed, and all candidates were returned unopposed.

1921 general election: Waterford–Tipperary East (uncontested)
| Party | Candidate |
|---|---|
| Sinn Féin | Cathal Brugha |
| Sinn Féin | Eamon Dee |
| Sinn Féin | Frank Drohan |
| Sinn Féin | Séumas Robinson |
| Sinn Féin | Vincent White |

== See also ==
- Dáil constituencies
- Politics of the Republic of Ireland
- Historic Dáil constituencies
- Elections in the Republic of Ireland
