= Michael Bradley (politician) =

Irish politician (died 1923)

Teachta Dála
- In office June 1922 – August 1923
- Constituency: Cork Mid, North, South, South East and West

Personal details
- Died: 23 November 1923
- Party: Labour Party

Michael Bradley (died 23 November 1923) was an Irish Labour Party politician. He was elected to Dáil Éireann at the 1922 general election, representing the Cork Mid, North, South, South East and West constituency. He did not seek re-election at the 1923 general election.

Dáil	Election	Deputy (Party)	Deputy (Party)	Deputy (Party)	Deputy (Party)	Deputy (Party)	Deputy (Party)	Deputy (Party)	Deputy (Party)
2nd	1921	Seán MacSwiney (SF)	Seán Nolan (SF)	Seán Moylan (SF)	Daniel Corkery (SF)	Michael Collins (SF)	Seán Hales (SF)	Seán Hayes (SF)	Patrick O'Keeffe (SF)
3rd	1922	Michael Bradley (Lab)	Thomas Nagle (Lab)	Seán Moylan (AT-SF)	Daniel Corkery (AT-SF)	Michael Collins (PT-SF)	Seán Hales (PT-SF)	Seán Hayes (PT-SF)	Daniel Vaughan (FP)
4th	1923	Constituency abolished. See Cork North and Cork West							
