= Pierce Butler (Irish politician, born 1922) =

Irish politician (1922–1999)

Senator
- In office 5 November 1969 – 13 May 1982
- Constituency: Agricultural Panel

Personal details
- Born: 1 September 1922 County Waterford, Ireland
- Died: 20 February 1999 (aged 76) County Tipperary, Ireland
- Party: Fine Gael
- Spouse: Eileen Sampson
- Parent: John Butler (father)

Pierce Butler (1 September 1922 – 20 February 1999) was a creamery manager and Fine Gael politician. He was a senator from 1969 to 1982.

Butler was born in Waterford in 1922, the son of the trade unionist John Butler, who later served as a Labour Party TD and senator. He moved to County Tipperary to become an assistant manager of Mitchelstown Creamery, and lived in Cahir, where he became active in a number of local organisations, including Macra na Feirme, and the Cahir Credit union.

He married Eileen Sampson, whose brother was a member of Tipperary County Council, and became involved in the local Fine Gael party, using his business experience to help resolve the local party's financial difficulties.

Butler was elected in 1969 to the 12th Seanad, on the Agricultural Panel, and was re-elected three times until he stood down at 1983 election to the 17th Seanad.

== See also ==
- Families in the Oireachtas
