= Nicholas Phelan =

Irish politician (1893–1942)

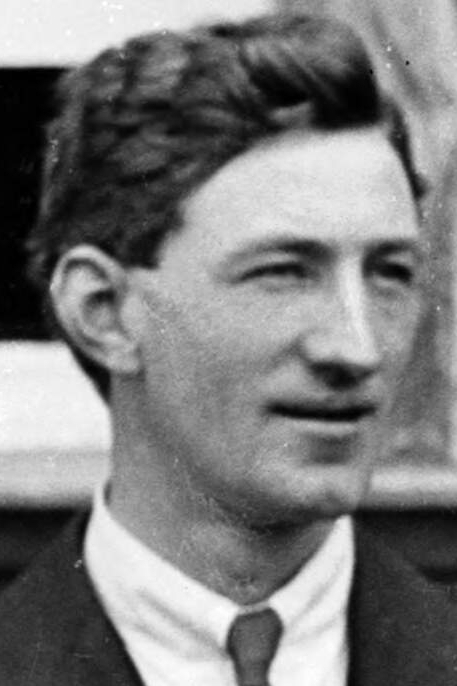
- Phelan in 1918

Teachta Dála
- In office June 1922 – August 1923
- Constituency: Waterford–Tipperary East

Personal details
- Born: 19 September 1893
- Died: 14 December 1942 (aged 49)
- Party: Labour Party

Nicholas Francis Phelan (19 September 1893 – 14 December 1942) was an Irish Labour Party politician. In 1918 Phelan was an organizer for the Irish Transport and General Workers' Union (ITGWU). The union successfully campaigned for wage increases for farm labourers and others against the use of non union labour.

He was elected to Dáil Éireann as a Labour Party Teachta Dála (TD) for the Waterford–Tipperary East constituency at the 1922 general election. He did not contest the 1923 general election.

Dáil	Election	Deputy (Party)	Deputy (Party)	Deputy (Party)	Deputy (Party)	Deputy (Party)
2nd	1921	Eamon Dee (SF)	Frank Drohan (SF)	Cathal Brugha (SF)	Vincent White (SF)	Séumas Robinson (SF)
3rd	1922	John Butler (Lab)	Nicholas Phelan (Lab)	Cathal Brugha (AT-SF)	Vincent White (PT-SF)	Daniel Byrne (FP)
4th	1923	Constituency abolished. See Waterford and Tipperary				
