= Daniel Byrne =

Irish politician (1885–1952)

Teachta Dála
- In office June 1922 – August 1923
- Constituency: Waterford–Tipperary East

Personal details
- Born: 5 October 1885 County Carlow, Ireland
- Died: 9 June 1952 (aged 66)
- Party: Farmers' Party
- Education: Yale School of Medicine

Daniel Joseph Byrne (5 October 1885 – 9 June 1952) was an Irish politician, medical doctor and farmer. He was elected to Dáil Éireann at the 1922 general election as a Farmers' Party Teachta Dála (TD) for the Waterford–Tipperary East constituency. He did not contest the 1923 general election.

He was born in Graiguealug, County Carlow, and was educated at Rockwell College, County Tipperary. He graduated from Yale School of Medicine in 1909. Following his return to Ireland in 1915 he later became involved in the Irish War of Independence.

His house, furniture and contents at the Islands Mullinahone was burned by armed men on 19 March 1923; burning and destruction of hay barn, hay and contents at same address by a number of men on 2 April 1923.

Dáil	Election	Deputy (Party)	Deputy (Party)	Deputy (Party)	Deputy (Party)	Deputy (Party)
2nd	1921	Eamon Dee (SF)	Frank Drohan (SF)	Cathal Brugha (SF)	Vincent White (SF)	Séumas Robinson (SF)
3rd	1922	John Butler (Lab)	Nicholas Phelan (Lab)	Cathal Brugha (AT-SF)	Vincent White (PT-SF)	Daniel Byrne (FP)
4th	1923	Constituency abolished. See Waterford and Tipperary				
