= Seán Nolan =

Irish politician

Teachta Dála
- In office May 1921 – June 1922
- Constituency: Cork Mid, North, South, South East and West

Personal details
- Party: Sinn Féin

Seán Nolan was an Irish anti-treaty insurgent and Sinn Féin politician. He was elected unopposed as a Sinn Féin Teachta Dála (TD) to the Second Dáil at the 1921 elections for the Cork Mid, North, South, South East and West constituency. He opposed the Anglo-Irish Treaty and voted against it. He stood as an anti-Treaty Sinn Féin candidate at the 1922 general election but was not elected.

| Dáil | Election | Deputy (Party) | Deputy (Party) | Deputy (Party) | Deputy (Party) | Deputy (Party) | Deputy (Party) | Deputy (Party) | Deputy (Party) |
|---|---|---|---|---|---|---|---|---|---|
| 2nd | 1921 | Seán MacSwiney (SF) | Seán Nolan (SF) | Seán Moylan (SF) | Daniel Corkery (SF) | Michael Collins (SF) | Seán Hales (SF) | Seán Hayes (SF) | Patrick O'Keeffe (SF) |
| 3rd | 1922 | Michael Bradley (Lab) | Thomas Nagle (Lab) | Seán Moylan (AT-SF) | Daniel Corkery (AT-SF) | Michael Collins (PT-SF) | Seán Hales (PT-SF) | Seán Hayes (PT-SF) | Daniel Vaughan (FP) |
| 4th | 1923 | Constituency abolished. See Cork North and Cork West | | | | | | | |
