= Frank Drohan =

Irish politician (1879–1953)

Teachta Dála
- In office May 1921 – 5 January 1922
- Constituency: Waterford–Tipperary East

Personal details
- Born: 13 August 1879 Carrick-on-Suir, Ireland
- Died: 5 March 1953 (aged 73) County Tipperary, Ireland
- Party: Sinn Féin

Frank Drohan (Irish: Proinsias O Druacháin; 13 August 1879 – 5 March 1953) was an Irish revolutionary and politician.

Born in Carrick-on-Suir, he moved to Clonmel with his family aged seven. Aged 12 he left school to work with his father, who was a coachmaker. In 1908 he was inducted into Craobh na hAiséirghe ('branch of the revival') by Frank O'Meara.

He founded a company of the Irish Volunteers in Clonmel in 1913. His unit assembled for the Easter Rising in 1916 but the countermanding order issued by Eoin MacNeill caused his men to disperse. He was arrested afterwards and interned at Frongoch camp. He was officer commanding of the 4th Battalion of the Third Tipperary Brigade (IRA) during the War of Independence.

He was elected unopposed at the 1921 elections for Waterford–Tipperary East as a Sinn Féin Teachta Dála (TD) in the Second Dáil.

He was personally opposed to the Anglo-Irish Treaty signed on 6 December 1921, but the local Sinn Féin branch instructed him to vote in favour; he felt the only honourable course was to submit his resignation, which was read out by the Ceann Comhairle Eoin MacNeill on 5 January 1922, two days before the Dáil voted to accept the Treaty.

He was a member of Clonmel Municipality from 1920 to 1925 and Mayor from 1922 to 1924. When the Clonmel branch of the Gaelic League was re-established in 1932 he was elected president.

Frank Drohan Road is the section of the N24 serving as an inner relief road outside Clonmel.

Dáil	Election	Deputy (Party)	Deputy (Party)	Deputy (Party)	Deputy (Party)	Deputy (Party)
2nd	1921	Eamon Dee (SF)	Frank Drohan (SF)	Cathal Brugha (SF)	Vincent White (SF)	Séumas Robinson (SF)
3rd	1922	John Butler (Lab)	Nicholas Phelan (Lab)	Cathal Brugha (AT-SF)	Vincent White (PT-SF)	Daniel Byrne (FP)
4th	1923	Constituency abolished. See Waterford and Tipperary				
