= 1922 Irish general election =

- 16 June 1922

All 128 seats in Dáil Éireann 65 (Note: The 36 Anti-Treaty Sinn Féin TDs did not take their seats, so the effective number of seats in the Dáil was 92, making a majority 47 seats.) seats needed for a majority
- Turnout: 62.5%
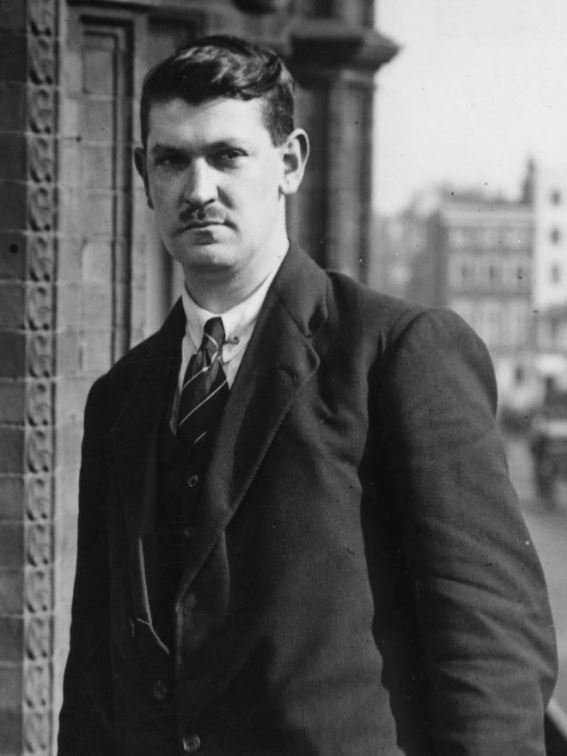

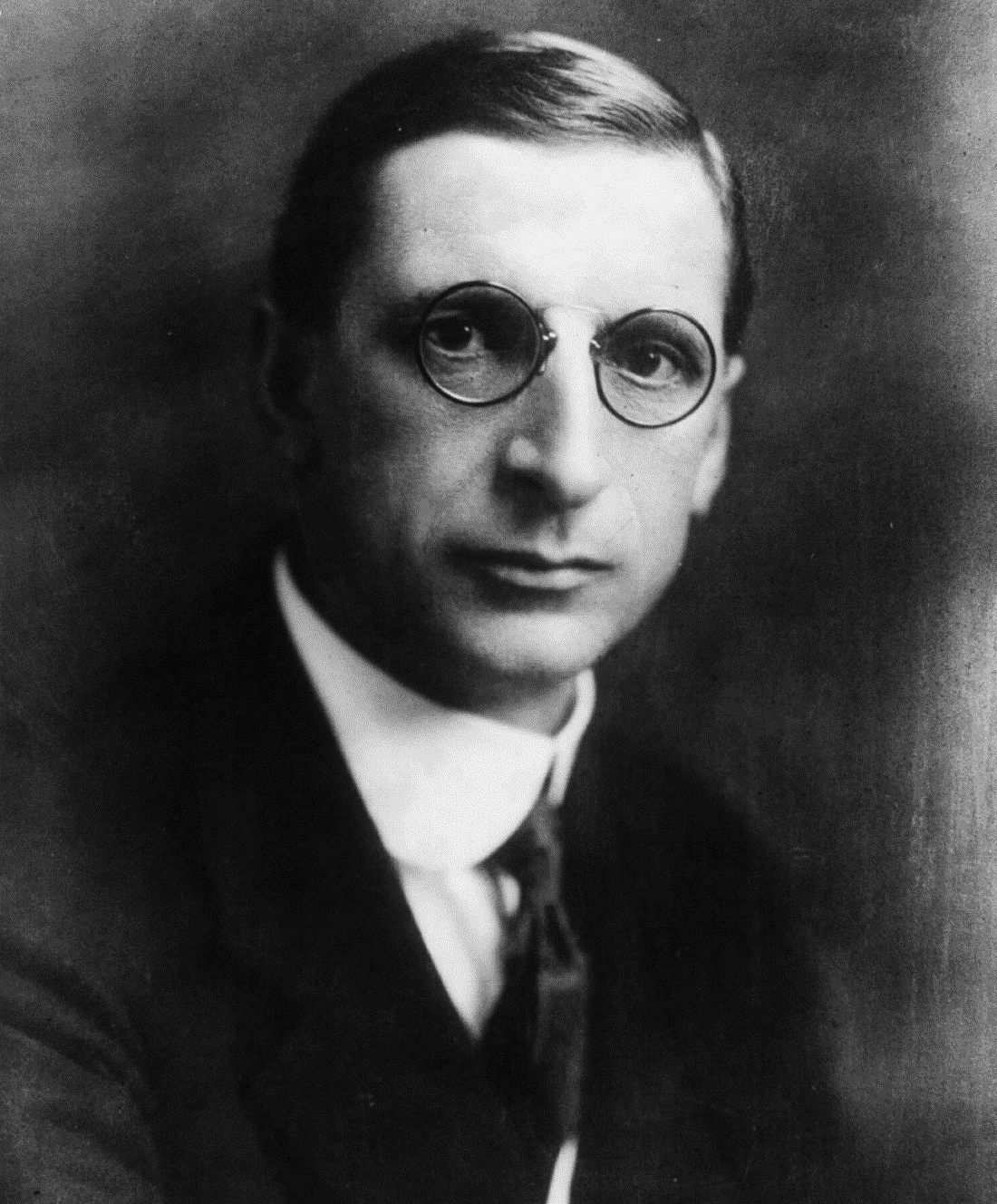

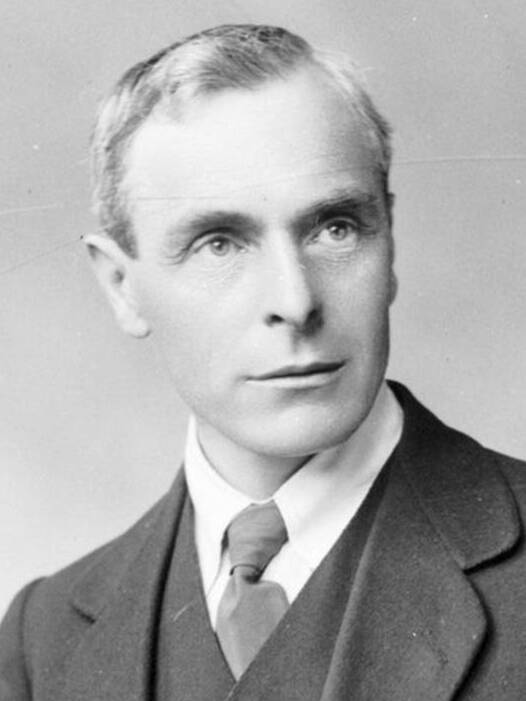

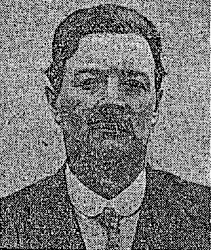
	First party	Second party
Leader	Michael Collins	Éamon de Valera
Party	Sinn Féin (Pro-Treaty)	Sinn Féin (Anti-Treaty)
Leader since	1922	1917
Leader's seat	Cork Mid, North, South, South East and West	Clare
Seats won	58	36
Popular vote	239,195	135,310
Percentage	38.5%	21.8%
	Third party	Fourth party
Leader	Thomas Johnson	Denis Gorey
Party	Labour	Farmers' Party
Leader since	1914	1922
Leader's seat	Dublin County	Carlow–Kilkenny
Seats won	17	7
Popular vote	132,565	48,718
Percentage	21.3%	7.8%
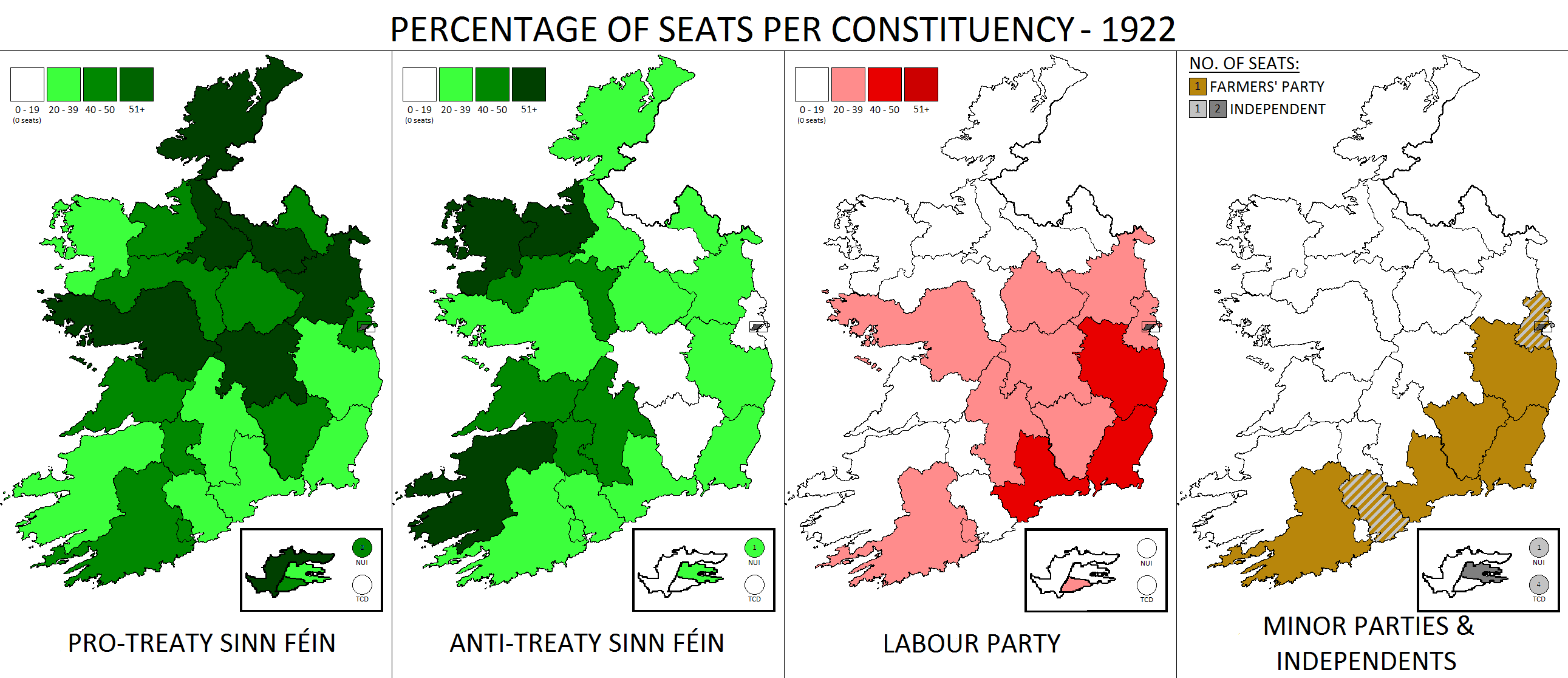
Chairman of the Provisional
Government before election
Michael Collins
Sinn Féin (Pro-Treaty)
Chairman of the
Provisional Government after election
Michael Collins
Sinn Féin (Pro-Treaty)

The 1922 Irish general election took place in Southern Ireland on Friday, 16 June. The election was separately called by a resolution of Dáil Éireann on 19 May and by an order of the Provisional Government on 27 May. The body elected was thus both the 3rd Dáil and provisional parliament replacing the parliament of Southern Ireland, under the provisions of the 1921 Anglo-Irish Treaty to elect a constituent assembly paving the way for the formal establishment of the Irish Free State. From 6 December 1922, it continued as the Dáil Éireann of the Irish Free State.

The election was held under the electoral system of proportional representation by means of the single transferable vote. It was the first contested general election held in the jurisdiction using the STV system. The election was held in the 128 seats using the constituencies designated to the Southern Ireland House of Commons in the Government of Ireland Act 1920. Under this Act, constituencies ranged in size from 3 to 8 seats, the largest being the eight seat Kerry–Limerick West and Cork Mid.

== Campaign ==
In the 1921 elections, Sinn Féin had won all seats in uncontested elections, except for the four in the Dublin University constituency. On this occasion, however, most seats were contested. The treaty had divided the party between 65 pro-treaty candidates, 57 anti-treaty and 1 nominally on both sides. To minimise losses due to competition from other parties, Éamon de Valera and Michael Collins worked out a pact approved on 20 May 1922. They agreed that the pro-treaty and anti-treaty factions would fight the general election jointly and form a coalition government afterwards. The sitting member would not be opposed by the other faction. This pact prevented voters giving their opinions on the treaty itself, especially in uncontested seats. However, the draft Constitution of the Irish Free State was then published on 15 June, and so the anti-treaty Sinn Féin group's 36 seats out of 128 seemed to many to be a democratic endorsement of the pro-treaty Sinn Féin's arrangements. Others argued that insufficient time was available to understand the draft constitution, but the main arguments and debates had already been made public during and after the Dáil Treaty Debates that had ended on 10 January 1922, nearly six months before.

Winston Churchill, the Secretary of State for the Colonies, opposed the Pact as undemocratic, and made a long statement on 31 May. He was responsible at the time for steering the transitional arrangements between the Provisional Government and the government of the United Kingdom in the period between the ratification of the Treaty and the creation of the Irish Free State.

Despite the Pact, the election results started the effective division of Sinn Féin into separate parties. The anti-Treaty TDs boycotted the new Dáil, even though they had requested, negotiated and approved the terms of the Pact. This boycott gave control of the Dáil to the pro-Treaty members of Sinn Féin, and so enabled W. T. Cosgrave to establish the Second Provisional Government. The First Executive Council of the Irish Free State was appointed on 6 December 1922 on the nomination of this Dáil.

== Result ==
Election to the 3rd Dáil – 16 June 1922
Party	Leader	Seats	±	% of seats	First pref. votes	% FPv	±%
Sinn Féin (Pro-Treaty)	Michael Collins	58	N/A	45.3	239,195	38.5	N/A
Sinn Féin (Anti-Treaty)	Éamon de Valera	36	N/A	28.1	135,310	21.8	N/A
Labour	Thomas Johnson	17	New	13.3	132,565	21.3	New
Farmers' Party	Denis Gorey	7	New	5.5	48,718	7.8	New
Businessmen's Party		1	New	0.8	14,542	2.3	New
Ratepayers' Association		0	New	0	2,617	0.4	New
Independent	N/A	9	N/A	7.0	48,638	7.8	N/A
Spoilt votes					19,684	—N/a	—N/a
Total		128	—	100	641,271	100	—N/a
Electorate/Turnout					1,430,104	62.5	—N/a

Many seats were won unopposed; 17 by Pro-Treaty Sinn Féin, 16 by Anti-Treaty Sinn Féin and 4 by independents.

=== Voting summary ===
First preference vote
Sinn Féin (Pro-Treaty)	38.48%
Sinn Féin (Anti-Treaty)	21.77%
Labour	21.33%
Farmers'	7.84%
Businessman's	2.34%
Ratepayers Association	0.42%
Independent	7.82%

Each party's seat share was within seven percent points of its vote share percentage.

=== Seats summary ===
Dáil seats
Sinn Féin (Pro-Treaty)	45.31%
Sinn Féin (Anti-Treaty)	28.13%
Labour	13.28%
Farmers'	5.47%
Businessman's	0.78%
Independent	7.03%

== Analysis ==
Out of a valid poll of 621,587 votes, the pro-Treaty faction of Sinn Féin won 239,195 votes and the anti-Treaty faction won 135,310 votes. The other parties and independents (see above) all supported the Treaty and secured a further 247,080 votes.

The vote was seen as significant in several ways:

- The pro-Treaty parties had secured support from over 72% of the electorate on the eve of the Irish Civil War.
- The non-Sinn Féin parties had support from over 40% of the electorate.

Further, the anti-Treaty candidates had taken part in an election in line with Article 11 of the Treaty, even though they had argued that it was flawed, being partitionist. Their pro-Treaty opponents argued that this revealed that their anti-Treaty stance was opportunist, and not principled. Article 11 of the Treaty had limited such an election to the constituencies of the formative Free State, and specifically excluded constituencies in Northern Ireland, yet the anti-Treaty argument was that the Dáil represented the whole island of Ireland.

== Government formation ==
Within 12 days, on 28 June 1922, as a result of the tensions between pro- and anti-Treatyites, the Irish Civil War broke out, when the Provisional Government's troops began a bombardment of the Anti-Treaty IRA's occupation of the Four Courts, Dublin. The Dáil had been due to convene on 1 July, but its opening was prorogued on 5 occasions, meeting on 9 September 1922.

Michael Collins and Arthur Griffith, leaders of two separate but co-operating administrations, had respectively been killed and had died in August. On 9 September 1922, W. T. Cosgrave, leader of the pro-Treaty Sinn Féin TDs, was elected as President of Dáil Éireann and formed the 5th Ministry of Dáil Éireann.

On 6 December 1922, on the establishment of the Irish Free State, Cosgrave was nominated by the Dáil to the position of President of the Executive Council, and was appointed by the Governor-General Tim Healy. He formed the 1st Executive Council of the Irish Free State.

== Change in membership ==
As each constituency was a multi-seat contest, rows represent changes in the constituency as a whole, rather than between individual TDs.

Constituency	Former TD	Party	Cause	New TD	Party
Carlow–Kilkenny	Edward Aylward	Sinn Féin (Anti-Treaty)	Defeated	Patrick Gaffney	Labour
Carlow–Kilkenny	James Lennon	Sinn Féin (Anti-Treaty)	Defeated	Denis Gorey	Farmers' Party
Cavan	Peter Paul Galligan	Sinn Féin (Pro-Treaty)	Retired	Walter L. Cole	Sinn Féin (Pro-Treaty)
Cork Borough	Donal O'Callaghan	Sinn Féin (Anti-Treaty)	Defeated	Robert Day	Labour
Cork East and North East	Séamus Fitzgerald	Sinn Féin (Anti-Treaty)	Defeated	John Dinneen	Farmers' Party
Cork East and North East	Thomas Hunter	Sinn Féin (Anti-Treaty)	Defeated	Michael Hennessy	Businessmen's Party
Cork Mid, North, South, South East and West	Seán MacSwiney	Sinn Féin (Anti-Treaty)	Defeated	Michael Bradley	Labour
Cork Mid, North, South, South East and West	Seán Nolan	Sinn Féin (Anti-Treaty)	Defeated	Thomas Nagle	Labour
Cork Mid, North, South, South East and West	Patrick O'Keeffe	Sinn Féin (Pro-Treaty)	Defeated	Daniel Vaughan	Farmers' Party
Dublin County	Séamus Dwyer	Sinn Féin (Pro-Treaty)	Defeated	Darrell Figgis	Independent
Dublin County	Frank Lawless	Sinn Féin (Pro-Treaty)	Died April 1922	Thomas Johnson	Labour
Dublin County	Margaret Pearse	Sinn Féin (Anti-Treaty)	Defeated	John Rooney	Farmers' Party
Dublin Mid	Kathleen Clarke	Sinn Féin (Anti-Treaty)	Defeated	Alfie Byrne	Independent
Dublin Mid	Philip Shanahan	Sinn Féin (Anti-Treaty)	Defeated	Laurence O'Neill	Independent
Dublin South	Constance Markievicz	Sinn Féin (Anti-Treaty)	Defeated	Myles Keogh	Independent
Dublin South	Cathal Ó Murchadha	Sinn Féin (Anti-Treaty)	Defeated	William O'Brien	Labour
Galway	Liam Mellows	Sinn Féin (Anti-Treaty)	Defeated	Thomas J. O'Connell	Labour
Kildare–Wicklow	Erskine Childers	Sinn Féin (Anti-Treaty)	Defeated	Hugh Colohan	Labour
Kildare–Wicklow	Art O'Connor	Sinn Féin (Anti-Treaty)	Defeated	James Everett	Labour
Kildare–Wicklow	Domhnall Ua Buachalla	Sinn Féin (Anti-Treaty)	Defeated	Richard Wilson	Farmers' Party
Leix–Offaly	Patrick McCartan	Sinn Féin (Pro-Treaty)	Defeated	William Davin	Labour
Longford–Westmeath	Joseph McGuinness	Sinn Féin (Pro-Treaty)	Died May 1922	Francis McGuinness	Sinn Féin (Pro-Treaty)
Longford–Westmeath	Lorcan Robbins	Sinn Féin (Pro-Treaty)	Defeated	John Lyons	Labour
Louth–Meath	Justin McKenna	Sinn Féin (Pro-Treaty)	Defeated	Cathal O'Shannon	Labour
Monaghan	Seán MacEntee	Sinn Féin (Anti-Treaty)	Retired	Patrick MacCarvill	Sinn Féin (Anti-Treaty)
National University	Ada English	Sinn Féin (Anti-Treaty)	Defeated	William Magennis	Independent
Tipperary Mid, North and South	Patrick O'Byrne	Sinn Féin (Anti-Treaty)	Defeated	Daniel Morrissey	Labour
Waterford–Tipperary East	Eamon Dee	Sinn Féin (Anti-Treaty)	Defeated	John Butler	Labour
Waterford–Tipperary East	Frank Drohan	Sinn Féin (Anti-Treaty)	Resigned Jan 1922	Daniel Byrne	Farmers' Party
Waterford–Tipperary East	Nicholas Phelan	Sinn Féin (Anti-Treaty)	Defeated	John Butler	Labour
Wexford	Seán Etchingham	Sinn Féin (Anti-Treaty)	Defeated	Michael Doyle	Farmers' Party
Wexford	James Ryan	Sinn Féin (Anti-Treaty)	Defeated	Daniel O'Callaghan	Labour

== Change in affiliation ==
TD who contested 1922 election under a different affiliation to 1921.

Constituency	Outgoing TD	Party in 1921	Party in 1922
Wexford	Richard Corish	Sinn Féin	Labour

== See also ==
- 1922 United Kingdom general election in Northern Ireland - the first elections to Westminster after the ratification of the Anglo-Irish Treaty that did not include the territory that would become the Irish Free State.
