= 24th Seanad =

Members of the Seanad from 2011 to 2016

←	23rd Seanad	25th Seanad	→

Overview
- Legislative body: Seanad Éireann
- Jurisdiction: Ireland
- Meeting place: Leinster House
- Term: 25 May 2011 – 9 February 2016
- Government: 29th government of Ireland
- Members: 60
- Cathaoirleach: Paddy Burke (FG)
- Leas-Chathaoirleach: Denis O'Donovan (FF)
- Leader of the Seanad: Maurice Cummins (FG)
- Deputy leader of the Seanad: Ivana Bacik (Lab)
- Leader of the Opposition: Darragh O'Brien (FF)

Sessions
- 1st: 25 May 2011 – 27 July 2011
- 2nd: 14 September 2011 – 20 July 2012
- 3rd: 19 September 2012 – 24 July 2013
- 4th: 20 August 2013 – 31 July 2014
- 5th: 17 September 2014 – 21 July 2015
- 6th: 23 September 2015 – 9 February 2016

The 24th Seanad was in office from 2011 to 2016. An election to Seanad Éireann, the senate of the Oireachtas (Irish parliament), followed the 2011 general election to the 31st Dáil on 25 February. There are 60 seats in the Seanad: 43 were elected on five vocational panels by serving politicians, for which polling closed on 26 April; 6 were elected in two university constituencies, for which polling closed on 27 April; and 11 were nominated by the Taoiseach (Enda Kenny) on 20 May 2011. The 24th Seanad first met at Leinster House on 25 May 2011. It remained in office until the close of poll for the 25th Seanad in April 2016.

== Cathaoirleach ==
On 25 May 2011, Paddy Burke (FG) was elected as the new Cathaoirleach of the Seanad. On 1 June 2011, Denis O'Donovan (FF) was elected as Leas-Cathaoirleach.

== Composition of the 24th Seanad ==
There are a total of 60 seats in the Seanad: 43 were elected on the vocational panels, 6 were elected by universities and 11 were nominated by the Taoiseach.

The following table shows the composition by party when the 24th Seanad first met on 25 May 2011.

Origin Party	Vocational panels					NUI	DU	Nominated	Total
Origin Party	Admin	Agri	Cult & Educ	Ind & Comm	Labour	NUI	DU	Nominated	Total
Fine Gael	3	4	2	4	5	0	0	1	19
Fianna Fáil	2	4	2	3	3	0	0	0	14
Labour	2	2	1	1	2	0	1	3	12
Sinn Féin	0	1	0	1	1	0	0	0	3
Independent	0	0	0	0	0	3	2	7	12
Total	7	11	5	9	11	3	3	11	60

=== Effect of changes ===
This table shows the political composition of the 24th Seanad at the start and the end of its term.

	May 2011	Feb. 2016
Fine Gael	19	15
Fianna Fáil	14	10
Labour	12	11
Sinn Féin	3	2
Renua	—N/a	1
Social Democrats	—N/a	1
Independent	12	13
Vacant	—N/a	7
Total	60	

== List of senators ==
- Note: The entries for Senators who were elected or appointed to fill vacancies are shown in italics

Name	Panel	Party	Notes
Martin Conway	Administrative Panel	Fine Gael	
Mark Daly	Administrative Panel	Fianna Fáil	Lost the Fianna Fáil party whip in December 2014. Re-gained the party whip in February 2015.
Michael W. D'Arcy	Administrative Panel	Fine Gael	Elected to Dáil at the 2016 general election
John Kelly	Administrative Panel	Labour	
Denis Landy	Administrative Panel	Labour	
Tom Sheahan	Administrative Panel	Fine Gael	
Diarmuid Wilson	Administrative Panel	Fianna Fáil	
Paul Bradford	Agricultural Panel	Fine Gael	Lost the Fine Gael party whip in July 2013. Joined Renua in March 2015.
Paddy Burke	Agricultural Panel	Fine Gael	
Michael Comiskey	Agricultural Panel	Fine Gael	
James Heffernan	Agricultural Panel	Labour	Lost the Labour Party whip in December 2012. Joined the Social Democrats in September 2015.
Paschal Mooney	Agricultural Panel	Fianna Fáil	
Trevor Ó Clochartaigh	Agricultural Panel	Sinn Féin	
Brian Ó Domhnaill	Agricultural Panel	Fianna Fáil	
Denis O'Donovan	Agricultural Panel	Fianna Fáil	
Susan O'Keeffe	Agricultural Panel	Labour	
Pat O'Neill	Agricultural Panel	Fine Gael	
Jim Walsh	Agricultural Panel	Fianna Fáil	Resigned the Fianna Fáil party whip in March 2015
Thomas Byrne	Cultural and Educational Panel	Fianna Fáil	Elected to Dáil at the 2016 general election
Deirdre Clune	Cultural and Educational Panel	Fine Gael	Resigned from the Seanad in May 2014 after being elected to the European Parliament
John Gilroy	Cultural and Educational Panel	Labour	
Michael Mullins	Cultural and Educational Panel	Fine Gael	
Labhrás Ó Murchú	Cultural and Educational Panel	Fianna Fáil	
Gerard Craughwell	Cultural and Educational Panel	Independent	Elected in a by-election on 10 October 2014, replacing Deirdre Clune
Colm Burke	Industrial and Commercial Panel	Fine Gael	
Paul Coghlan	Industrial and Commercial Panel	Fine Gael	
Jimmy Harte	Industrial and Commercial Panel	Labour	Resigned from the Seanad in September 2015
Imelda Henry	Industrial and Commercial Panel	Fine Gael	
Marc MacSharry	Industrial and Commercial Panel	Fianna Fáil	Elected to Dáil at the 2016 general election
Catherine Noone	Industrial and Commercial Panel	Fine Gael	
Averil Power	Industrial and Commercial Panel	Fianna Fáil	Resigned from Fianna Fáil in May 2015
Kathryn Reilly	Industrial and Commercial Panel	Sinn Féin	
Mary White	Industrial and Commercial Panel	Fianna Fáil	
Máiría Cahill	Industrial and Commercial Panel	Labour	Elected in a by-election on 13 November 2015, replacing Jimmy Harte.
Terry Brennan	Labour Panel	Fine Gael	
David Cullinane	Labour Panel	Sinn Féin	Elected to Dáil at the 2016 general election
Maurice Cummins	Labour Panel	Fine Gael	
Fidelma Healy Eames	Labour Panel	Fine Gael	Lost the Fine Gael party whip in July 2013
Cáit Keane	Labour Panel	Fine Gael	
Terry Leyden	Labour Panel	Fianna Fáil	
Marie Moloney	Labour Panel	Labour	
Tony Mulcahy	Labour Panel	Fine Gael	
Darragh O'Brien	Labour Panel	Fianna Fáil	Elected to Dáil at the 2016 general election
Ned O'Sullivan	Labour Panel	Fianna Fáil	
John Whelan	Labour Panel	Labour	
John Crown	National University of Ireland	Independent	
Rónán Mullen	National University of Ireland	Independent	
Feargal Quinn	National University of Ireland	Independent	
Ivana Bacik	Dublin University	Labour	
Sean Barrett	Dublin University	Independent	
David Norris	Dublin University	Independent	
Eamonn Coghlan	Nominated by the Taoiseach	Independent	Joined Fine Gael on 7 February 2012
Jim D'Arcy	Nominated by the Taoiseach	Fine Gael	
Aideen Hayden	Nominated by the Taoiseach	Labour	
Lorraine Higgins	Nominated by the Taoiseach	Labour	
Fiach Mac Conghail	Nominated by the Taoiseach	Independent	
Martin McAleese	Nominated by the Taoiseach	Independent	Resigned from the Seanad on 5 February 2013
Mary Moran	Nominated by the Taoiseach	Labour	
Mary Ann O'Brien	Nominated by the Taoiseach	Independent	
Marie-Louise O'Donnell	Nominated by the Taoiseach	Independent	
Jillian van Turnhout	Nominated by the Taoiseach	Independent	
Katherine Zappone	Nominated by the Taoiseach	Independent	Elected to Dáil at the 2016 general election
Hildegarde Naughton	Nominated by the Taoiseach	Fine Gael	Appointed on 19 July 2013, replacing Martin McAleese. Elected to Dáil at the 2016 general election

== Changes ==
Date	Panel	Loss	Gain	Note
7 February 2012	Nominated by the Taoiseach	Independent	Fine Gael	Eamonn Coghlan joins Fine Gael
21 December 2012	Agricultural Panel	Labour	Independent	James Heffernan loses the parliamentary Labour Party whip
5 February 2013	Nominated by the Taoiseach	Independent		Martin McAleese resigns from the Seanad
16 July 2013	Labour Panel	Fine Gael	Independent	Fidelma Healy Eames loses the Fine Gael party whip for voting against the Protection of Life During Pregnancy Bill 2013
16 July 2013	Agricultural Panel	Fine Gael	Independent	Paul Bradford loses the Fine Gael party whip for voting against the Protection of Life During Pregnancy Bill 2013
19 July 2013	Nominated by the Taoiseach		Fine Gael	Hildegarde Naughton appointed to replace Martin McAleese
27 May 2014	Cultural and Educational Panel	Fine Gael		Deirdre Clune resigns from the Seanad after being elected to the European Parliament.
10 October 2014	Cultural and Educational Panel		Independent	Gerard Craughwell wins by-election to replace Deirdre Clune
21 December 2014	Administrative Panel	Fianna Fáil	Independent	Mark Daly loses the Fianna Fáil party whip on Water Services Bill
3 February 2015	Administrative Panel	Independent	Fianna Fáil	Mark Daly re-gains the Fianna Fáil party whip
13 March 2015	Agricultural Panel	Independent	Renua	Paul Bradford joins Renua on its foundation
26 March 2015	Agricultural Panel	Fianna Fáil	Independent	Jim Walsh resigns the Fianna Fáil party whip in opposition to the Children and Family Relationships Bill 2015 and the Thirty-fourth Amendment of the Constitution (Marriage Equality) Bill 2015
25 May 2015	Industrial and Commercial Panel	Fianna Fáil	Independent	Averil Power resigns from Fianna Fáil
3 September 2015	Agricultural Panel	Independent	Social Democrats	James Heffernan joins the Social Democrats
23 September 2015	Industrial and Commercial Panel	Labour		Jimmy Harte resigns from the Seanad
13 November 2015	Industrial and Commercial Panel		Labour	Máiría Cahill elected in by-election
26 February 2016	Cultural and Educational Panel	Fianna Fáil		Thomas Byrne elected to the 32nd Dáil
26 February 2016	Labour Panel	Sinn Féin		David Cullinane elected to the 32nd Dáil
26 February 2016	Administrative Panel	Fine Gael		Michael D'Arcy elected to the 32nd Dáil
26 February 2016	Industrial and Commercial Panel	Fianna Fáil		Marc MacSharry elected to the 32nd Dáil
26 February 2016	Nominated by the Taoiseach	Fine Gael		Hildegarde Naughton elected to the 32nd Dáil
26 February 2016	Labour Panel	Fianna Fáil		Darragh O'Brien elected to the 32nd Dáil
26 February 2016	Nominated by the Taoiseach	Independent		Katherine Zappone elected to the 32nd Dáil
