= Vocational panel =

Lists of candidates for Seanad Éireann

A vocational panel (Irish: rolla gairm bheatha) is any of five lists of candidates from which are elected a total of 43 of the 60 (Note: Of the other 17 senators, 6 are elected from university constituencies and 11 are appointed by the Taoiseach (prime minister).) senators in Seanad Éireann, the upper house of the Oireachtas (parliament) of Ireland. Each panel corresponds to a grouping of "interests and services" (professions or vocations) of which candidates are required to have "knowledge and practical experience". The panels are nominated partly by Oireachtas members and partly by vocational organisations. From each panel, between five and eleven senators are elected indirectly, by Oireachtas members and local councillors, using the single transferable vote. The broad requirements are specified by Article 18 of the Constitution of Ireland and the implementation details by acts of the Oireachtas, principally the Seanad Electoral (Panel Members) Act 1947, and associated statutory instruments.

== Interests and services, and subpanels ==
Article 18.7.1° of the Constitution defines the five panels and specifies that each shall elect between five and eleven senators. The 1947 act defines the numbers of senators to be elected from each of the panels, and also provides for the division of each panel into two subpanels: the nominating bodies subpanel and the Oireachtas subpanel, with a minimum number from each subpanel. The number of nominations any one body can make depends on both the number of bodies registered for the panel, and the number of senators elected from it.

Senate vocational panels
Panel	Senators		Nominating bodies (as of May 2024)		"Interests and services" represented
Panel	Total	Min. per subpanel	Number	Max nominees per body (Note: This maximum applies only in a general election; in a by-election, the maximum is one.)	"Interests and services" represented
Administrative	7	3	22	1	"Public administration and social services, including voluntary social activities"
Agricultural	11	4	12	2	"Agriculture and allied interests, and fisheries"
Cultural and Educational	5	2	35	1	"The national language [Irish] and culture, literature, art, education" and "such professional interests as may be defined by law". The 1947 act lists two professional interests: "law" and "medicine, including surgery, dentistry, veterinary medicine, and pharmaceutical chemistry"
Industrial and Commercial	9	3	47	1	"Industry and commerce, including banking, finance, accountancy, engineering, and architecture"
Labour	11	4	2	7	"Labour, whether organised or unorganised"
Total	43	—	118	—	—

== Nominations ==
All senators must be Irish citizens over the age of 21. Each panel has two subpanels, whose candidates are nominated separately:

- The nominating bodies subpanel (the "outside panel") — nominated by a registered "nominating body".
- The Oireachtas subpanel (the "inside panel") — nominated by four Oireachtas members, either senators or TDs (members of Dáil Éireann, the lower house of the Oireachtas). (Note: At a Seanad general election, eligible nominators are the incoming TDs and the outgoing senators.)

=== Nominating bodies ===
A nominating body for a panel is an organisation whose work or members relates to one or more of the interests on the panel; for example, the Irish Congress of Trade Unions (ICTU) can nominate in the Labour Panel, and the Royal Irish Academy in the Cultural and Educational Panel. Bodies must be non-profit and meet minimum governance standards. A body cannot be registered on two panels; thus the Royal Dublin Society is on the Agricultural Panel but not the Cultural and Educational Panel. A body and an affiliate may not be registered on the same panel, but may be registered on different ones; for example the ICTU-affiliated Irish National Teachers' Organisation (INTO) is on the Cultural and Educational Panel. The clerk of the Seanad maintains the register of nominating bodies, published annually in Iris Oifigiúil. Some bodies are very small — the minimum annual subscription of €317.43 (Note: £250) has not increased since 1947 — and "it is even alleged that some ... exist for no other purpose than to make Seanad nominations".

Bodies refused registration can appeal to a board comprising the Ceann Comhairle and Cathaoirleach (Dáil and Seanad speakers), their deputies, and a senior judge. In 1987 ICTU tried to have the Irish Conference of Professional and Service Associations (ICPSA) deregistered from the Labour Panel on the grounds that it had no independent existence and its members were professional associations but not labour unions. The appeal board rejected the claim on the ground that one registered body could not object to a different body's registration. Journalist Patrick Nolan commented that the ICPSA's Fianna Fáil and Fine Gael nominees had had more electoral success than ICTU's Labour-Party nominees. In October 2018 separate meetings elected rival officer boards to the Irish Greyhound Owners and Breeders' Federation, a nominating body on the Agricultural Panel. In February 2019 the Seanad clerk updated the register with the newer officers' details. In June 2019 the appeal board ruled that, in view of continued uncertainty, the older officers' details should have been retained.

=== Party strategy ===
The closing date for the nominating bodies subpanel is earlier than for the Oireachtas subpanel; political parties wait to see which of their candidates have secured nomination on an outside panel before deciding who to nominate on the inside panel. Parties generally try to distribute their most popular candidates across both panels to avoid falling foul of the minimum-elected-per-subpanel rules. Since the electorate is small and mostly of known party allegiance, larger parties have a good idea of how many quotas they can secure on each panel; they will always nominate at least that many candidates, but typically not many more, for fear of losing out on a seat through "leakage" of transfers. Parties have tight control of the Oireachtas subpanel nominations; in 1997, Fianna Fáil and Fine Gael nominees were selected mainly by the parliamentary party and partly by the party leader, whereas the Labour Party's were selected by its General Council, surprisingly omitting high-profile ex-TDs. The Progressive Democrats, having formed a coalition with Fianna Fáil after the general election, agreed not to field candidates in the panel election, in return for some of the direct Seanad appointments reserved for the Taoiseach. In 2002, Fine Gael gave its Dáil constituency organisations a say in nominations. Since the 1990s, smaller parties have engaged in voting pacts, each having a nominee on a different panel. In 1992 the Progressive Democrats and Democratic Left had a successful pact which saw senators elected. In 2016, whereas Gerard Craughwell successfully encouraged independents to support independents, a pact between the Social Democrats and People Before Profit–Solidarity did not see any senator elected.

=== Knowledge and practical experience ===
There is no statutory definition of what constitutes a sufficient degree of "knowledge and practical experience" of an interest or service to be eligible for nomination to the relevant panel. The question is decided by the clerk of the Seanad, but may be referred by him, or appealed by the candidate, to a judge of the High Court appointed as "judicial referee". No further judicial review is permitted. In 2018 clerk Martin Groves said that "legislative guidelines would be of assistance to the returning officer and, I am sure, to candidates also". Before the 1969 Seanad election, outgoing Labour-Panel senators John Ormonde and Séamus Dolan sought a pre-emptive High Court declaration that they were qualified, being members of a union (the INTO) affiliated to the ICTU. The Seanad clerk (Note: John McGowan Smyth (Seán MacGabhann)) argued that as the INTO was itself a nominating body on the Cultural and Educational Panel, that was the panel on which they would be qualified. Justice Denis Pringle, ruling in favour the plaintiffs, stated that it did not matter if they were better qualified for a different panel, and that, as regards the Labour Panel, while merely being in a union was insufficient, a candidate did not require "specialised" knowledge, and the plaintiff's testimony had established their qualifications. The clerk commented that, while an application form with detailed evidence similar to the plaintiffs' testimony might have satisfied him, a form simply making a bare assertion of knowledge and practical experience would not. In 2002, Kathy Sinnott successfully appealed her rejection from the Labour Panel; the clerk (Note: Deirdre Lane) argued that her work as a caregiver properly belonged to the Administrative Panel. Sinnott rejected a suggestion that she chose the Labour Panel because its returning 11 rather than 7 senators increased her chances of winning. In 2014, Fine Gael minister Heather Humphreys nominated John McNulty to the board of the Irish Museum of Modern Art (IMMA) shortly before Fine Gael nominated him to a by-election on the Oireachtas subpanel of the Cultural and Educational Panel. The IMMA nomination was seen as an attempt to bolster McNulty's tenuous qualifications, and the ensuing controversy impelled him to withdraw his candidacy. (Note: His name remained from the ballot paper, but he urged electors not to vote for him.) In the 2020 Seanad election, Paul Hayes was excluded from the Agricultural Panel on the basis that, although he had the required "knowledge" of fishing, he lacked "practical experience"; Hayes suggested that with more time he could have supplied sufficient documentation to support his case.

=== Completion of panels ===
The "completion of panels" occurs in public on a specified date after nominations close, when the clerk of the Seanad, assisted by the judicial referee, excludes invalid nomination papers and unqualified nominees, and allows candidates nominated on multiple panels or subpanels to select which one to go forward on. (Note: In the 1981 Seanad election, one candidate was nominated on two different panels, and another on both subpanels of one panel. On the other hand, candidates may be nominated by more than one body on the same outside panel, as in the 2020 Seanad election were John Dolan by seven on the Administrative Panel and Timmy Dooley by five on the Industrial and Commercial Panel.) This creates a list of provisional subpanels. The minimum number of nominees for each subpanel is two plus the maximum number to be elected from the subpanel. If there are too few candidates on a provisional subpanel, the Taoiseach must nominate extra candidates to complete the panel. In the 1997 Seanad election, Bertie Ahern was obliged to nominate four candidates across three Oireachtas subpanels, none of whom polled well in the ensuing election. Whereas appointments directly to the Seanad must be by a Taoiseach elected after a Dáil general election, nomination of candidates to complete a panel may be by an acting Taoiseach. For example, in 2020 Leo Varadkar was acting Taoiseach after the Dáil election; in the ensuing Seanad election, Oireachtas members only nominated eight candidates to their subpanel of the Labour Panel, so Varadkar nominated one more to bring the total up to the minimum of nine.

== Election ==
In all panel elections postal voting is used. The clerk of the Seanad is the returning officer of the count, during which each ballot is given the value of 1,000 to aid the transfer of fractions of votes. The electoral college is the same for all of the vocational panels but varies between general and by-elections. At a Seanad general election, the electorate comprises the members of city and county councils, the newly elected Dáil and the outgoing Seanad; as of 2025 these number 949, 174, and 60 respectively, discounting any vacancies. (Note: Someone holding multiple seats (before the 2003 abolition of the dual mandate) would only get one vote in the panel elections. Typically, some local councillors and members of the old Seanad will have just been elected to the new Dáil, vacating their former seats; in some cases a replacement can be nominated in time to vote in the panel elections. No by-elections are held to replace outgoing panel or university senators. Replacing a Taoiseach-appointed senator can be done by an incoming Taoiseach (elected by the new Dáil) but not by the outgoing Taoiseach (who is acting Taoiseach until the new Dáil elects a replacement). Thus, when Hildegarde Naughton was elected to the Dáil in 2016, acting Taoiseach Enda Kenny was not able to nominate a replacement Senator to vote in the ensuing Seanad election. Typically, local councils co-opt replacements in time. Whereas three members of Fingal County Council were elected in the 2024 Dáil election, two replacements were co-opted in time for the ensuing Seanad election, for the Sinn Féin and Labour councillors but not the Socialist Party's. Labour's Kevin Humphreys was a "temporary co-option" who would vote for Labour candidates in the Seanad election and later resign to be replaced on the council by the winner of a party selection convention.) At a by-election the voters are the current members of the Dáil and Seanad.

At a general election each panel is elected separately, the ballot listing nominees from both subpanels collated together in alphabetical order of surname. Voting is by the single transferable vote (STV), with the modification that a minimum number from each subpanel must be elected. The legislation requires the five panels' counts to be held consecutively rather than in parallel, which delays its completion. Campaigns are out of the public eye but hard fought, as candidates travel the country to meet in person with as many as possible of the voters, who as public representatives themselves engage deeply with the process. The processing of nominations and the posting out, receiving back, and counting of ballot papers requires close to the constitutional maximum of 90 days to complete. The redistribution of an elected candidate's surplus is done by transferring a fractional value of all their votes, rather the full value of a (random) fraction of their votes as is done in Dáil elections. The Seanad method is more accurate but considered too cumbersome to implement at Dáil elections, which have much larger electorates.

By-elections to fill a casual vacancy use instant runoff voting. By-election nominations are from the same subpanel as the departed senator; no body can nominate multiple candidates. If there are multiple vacancies on the same subpanel, separate parallel by-elections are held instead of a single multiple-seat STV by-election. Whereas at a Seanad general election a candidate may only stand on one of the ten subpanels, one can stand in multiple simultaneous by-elections, as Niall Blaney did on 27 April 2018 when there were by-elections for both sub-panels of the Agricultural Panel. A by-election must be called within 180 days of the clerk of the Seanad notifying the Minister for Local Government of a vacancy. The clerk will only make such notification when the Seanad passes a resolution to do so—Jimmy Dunne died on 23 February 1972 but the requisite resolution was not passed until 3 November 1972, and a Dáil general election on 28 February 1973 pre-empted any Seanad by-election, so that Dunne's seat remained vacant for 434 days, until the 13th Seanad general election on 1 May 1973.

== Practical effects of the panel system ==
In practice, the vocational element is largely notional. The elaborate nomination and voting process is described as pointlessly complex. Because the electorate is restricted to elected representatives, political parties have a great influence in the nominations. Many panel candidates aspire to stand in the following Dáil election, including ex-TDs and others defeated at the preceding Dáil election. Until the 1980s, candidates from the nominating bodies subpanels won the minimum permitted on each panel; this changed when bodies which had been nominating non-politicians switched to nominating party politicians. In 1980 Roy C. Geary described as "ludicrous" the fact that the Royal Irish Academy routinely nominated its president for the time being onto the outside panel, despite knowing he would receive few votes, sometimes none at all. The ballot is secret, so no party whip can be applied to the voters; however, analysis of transfers shows a high degree of party cohesion. Candidates typically concentrate on canvassing independent councillors as floating voters. In the 2007 election from the Cultural and Educational Panel, because of the minimum-seats-per-subpanel rule, Fine Gael's Terence Slowey was eliminated despite having more votes than Ann Ormonde of Fianna Fáil; the Irish Independent commented on the "arcane rules" and Fine Gael's "poor planning and failure to anticipate the strategy of the opposition".

The by-election limit of one nominee per body is most pertinent on the Labour panel, where there are only two nominating bodies: the ICTU, which is allied to the Labour Party, and the ICPSA. In a 1960 by-election, ICTU nominee Edward Browne was returned unopposed. There was speculation before the 1998 by-election that Fianna Fáil's plan to secure the ICPSA nomination would be stymied by the ICPSA-affiliated Garda Representative Association's opposition to the Fianna Fáil-led government's policies; but in the event John Cregan was nominated and won the seat.

Seanad standing orders make no distinction between senators elected from a panel and other senators, or among different panels. For example, of the four senators on the Oireachtas joint committee on Agriculture, Food and the Marine in 2017, only one had been elected from the Agricultural Panel; two were from other panels, while the fourth was a Taoiseach's appointee. John Counihan in 1942 tried unsuccessfully to organise a meeting of Agricultural Panel senators, which Basil Chubb noted as a unique event. While outgoing senators seeking re-election keep to the same panel as a rule, there are exceptions; Andy O'Brien, Peter Lynch and Joe O'Reilly were each returned from three different panels in their careers. The fact that the electorate is composed mainly of officials elected in party-political elections means the candidates they favour are also party-political rather than vocationally oriented. Since the 2008 recession there has been an increased proportion of independent politicians elected at local and Dáil elections, which in turn has led to some independent senators returned from the panel elections since 2014; some but not all of these have a greater focus on the functional areas of their panel. Prior to this, only a handful of independent vocational senators were elected under the 1947 act, the most recent being Seán Brosnahan of the INTO on the Labour Panel in 1973.

== History ==
The vocational aspect of the Seanad's constitution was a reflection of the influence of corporatism on Catholic social teaching of the 1930s, as outlined in the encyclical Quadragesimo anno. (Note: Basil Chubb points out that the corporatist idea was already undermined by the separation of "Labour" from "Industry and Commerce" and "Administration", dividing by social class rather than economic sector.) This teaching influenced Éamon de Valera's thinking during the drafting of the 1937 Constitution. Article 45 and 56 of the 1922 Constitution of the Irish Free State had made provision for delegating power to "Functional or Vocational Councils representing branches of the social and economic life of the Nation", which was never utilised. The place of the Seanad in the new constitution was first discussed by a 1936 commission, which produced a majority and minority report, with dissenters from both.

1936 Second House of the Oireachtas Commission recommendations
Report	Fraction elected	Sectors of interest to be represented	Candidates nominated by	Electors
Majority	30 of 45	"National Language and Culture, the Arts, Agriculture (in all its forms) and Fisheries, Industry and Commerce, Finance, Health and Social Welfare, Foreign Affairs, Education, Law, Labour, Public Administration (including Town and Country Planning)."	A committee (not necessarily TDs) elected by TDs using proportional representation	Dáil election candidates, weighted by first-preference vote
Minority	40 of 50	"(1) Farming and Fisheries, (2) Labour, (3) Industry and Commerce, (4) Education and the learned Professions."	Largely by specified functional organisations; partly by the minister of the relevant department.	TDs

De Valera's 1937 Seanad took more from the minority report. Echoing Articles 45 and 56 of the 1922 constitution, Article 15.3.1° of the 1937 constitution permits "the establishment or recognition of functional or vocational councils representing branches of the social and economic life of the people" while Article 19 permits senators to be elected by a "functional or vocational group or association or council" instead of by a panel. The Article 18 panel mechanism was envisaged as a temporary measure until such time as Irish society and economic life would be structured on more corporatist lines and Article 19 could be applied instead. With this goal in mind a Commission on Vocational Organisation, chaired by bishop Michael Browne, was established in 1939. Its 1944 report paid little attention to Article 19, suggesting instead more radical constitutional changes, and was practically ignored by the government. Surveys of the constitution have suggested Article 19 is now redundant.

The original electoral method differed in several ways from that used since 1947:

- Outgoing senators did not participate in voting or nominating. (Hence the inside panel was called the "Dáil subpanel" rather than the "Oireachtas subpanel".)
- Instead of all county councillors voting directly for the panel, each council elected seven of its members to the electoral college.
- There was a single STV ballot paper listing all candidates for all panels in order of surname. The requirement for specific numbers of winners from each of five panels (and ten subpanels) was preserved, greatly complicating the task for voters filling in the large ballot, and for eliminating candidates during the STV count process.
- The number of nominating bodies per panel was limited, and the registration appeals committee was composed entirely of TDs. The Labour Party boycotted the April 1938 Seanad election in protest that the Cottage Tenants and Rural Workers Association, a small group based in Ballingarry, County Limerick, had the same status as the ICTU on the Labour Panel.
- For casual vacancies in the nominating bodies subpanel, the bodies formed a committee which elected a shortlist of three candidates by multiple non-transferable vote; from these three a winner was selected by the Taoiseach.
- the duties of returning officer at panel elections and registrar of panel nominating bodies were performed by a departmental civil servant (Note: Wilfred Brown of the Department of Local Government.) rather than the clerk of the Seanad.

For the April 1938 Seanad election, there were only 330 voters (24 of the 354 electors boycotted) which in a 43-seat ballot gave a quota of just eight votes to be elected. There were rumours of vote buying after the first three Seanad election and finally two convictions after the 1944 Seanad election. The Seanad Electoral (Panel Members) Act 1937 was therefore repealed and replaced by the Seanad Electoral (Panel Members) Act 1947, which is still in force with minor amendments. It increased the size of the electoral college, split the panels into separate ballots, and increased the security procedures around postal voting. Martin O'Donoghue argues that senators before the 1947 act often showed a genuine vocational orientation, but this was undermined by the corruption allegations.

Until the Local Government Act 2001, the Minister for Local Government had the power to dissolve local councils. Where a county or county borough's council was dissolved, its members retained the right to vote in Seanad panel elections. This last applied at the 1973 Seanad election, to surviving members of Dublin Corporation at its 1969 dissolution. The Local Government Reform Act 2014 changed the number of councillors on each city and county council, to be somewhat more aligned with each area's population. The 2016 Seanad election reflected this demographic shift in the panel electorate with an increase in the number returned from more populous urbanised areas at the expense of more rural areas.

== Reform proposals ==
Seanad reform proposals may be divided into those requiring amending the Constitution of Ireland via referendum, and those limited to amendment of statute law within the existing constitutional parameters. Those in the former group typically suggest abolishing the vocational aspect of the Seanad as ineffectual and based on outdated political thinking. Proposals in the latter group typically suggest altering the nomination process and the franchise. The 1958–59 Seanad Electoral Law Commission proposed changing the electorate for the outside subpanel from elected representatives to the nominating bodies. Opponents of such a change have suggested that, rather than replacing party politics with vocationalism in the Seanad, it would instead politicise the nominating bodies. The 2015 Manning report recommended that "the concept of vocational representation be retained but modernised", with 13 panel senators still elected on the current limited franchise, and the other 30 popularly elected. The 2018 report of the Seanad Reform Implementation Group was based on the Manning report but altered these numbers to 15 and 28. In both reports, all citizens over 18 could register either for one of the five nominating bodies subpanels or (if a graduate) for the university constituency, but not both.

== See also ==
- 1969 French constitutional referendum — rejected proposal to merge the Economic, Social and Environmental Council into the Senate
- Functional constituency — in Hong Kong and Macao
