= 17th Seanad =

Members of the Seanad from 1983 to 1987

←	16th Seanad	18th Seanad	→

Overview
- Legislative body: Seanad Éireann
- Jurisdiction: Ireland
- Meeting place: Leinster House
- Term: 23 February 1983 – 3 April 1987
- Government: 17th government
- Members: 60
- Cathaoirleach: Patrick J. Reynolds (FG)
- Leas-Chathaoirleach: Tras Honan (FF)
- Leader of the Seanad: James Dooge

The 17th Seanad was in office from 1983 to 1987. An election to Seanad Éireann, the senate of the Oireachtas (Irish parliament), followed the November 1982 general election to the 24th Dáil. The senators served until the close of poll for the 18th Seanad.

== Cathaoirleach ==
On 23 February 1983, Patrick J. Reynolds (FG) was proposed as Cathaoirleach by James Dooge (FG) and seconded by Seán O'Leary (FG). He was elected without a division.

On 9 March 1983, Tras Honan (FF) was proposed as Leas-Chathaoirleach by Mick Lanigan (FF) and seconded by Thomas Hussey (FF). She was elected without a division.

== Composition of the 17th Seanad ==
There are a total of 60 seats in the Seanad: 43 were elected on five vocational panels, 6 were elected from two university constituencies and 11 were nominated by the Taoiseach.

The following table shows the composition by party when the 17th Seanad first met on 23 February 1983.

Origin Party	Vocational panels					NUI	DU	Nominated	Total
Origin Party	Admin	Agri	Cult & Educ	Ind & Comm	Labour	NUI	DU	Nominated	Total
Fine Gael	3	5	2	4	5	1	0	5	25
Fianna Fáil	3	5	2	4	5	0	0	0	19
Labour Party	1	1	1	1	1	1	1	3	10
Independent	0	0	0	0	0	1	2	3	6
Total	7	11	5	9	11	3	3	11	60

== List of senators ==
- Note: The entries for Senators who were elected or appointed to fill vacancies are shown in italics

Name	Panel	Party	Notes
Luke Belton	Administrative Panel	Fine Gael	
Katharine Bulbulia	Administrative Panel	Fine Gael	
Tras Honan	Administrative Panel	Fianna Fáil	
Patrick Kennedy	Administrative Panel	Fine Gael	
Michael Lynch	Administrative Panel	Fianna Fáil	Elected to the 25th Dáil at the general election on 17 February 1987
Martin O'Donoghue	Administrative Panel	Fianna Fáil	
Flor O'Mahony	Administrative Panel	Labour	
Ulick Burke	Agricultural Panel	Fine Gael	
John Ellis	Agricultural Panel	Fianna Fáil	Elected to the 25th Dáil at the general election on 17 February 1987
Michael Ferris	Agricultural Panel	Labour	
Richard Hourigan	Agricultural Panel	Fine Gael	
Thomas Hussey	Agricultural Panel	Fianna Fáil	
Rory Kiely	Agricultural Panel	Fianna Fáil	
Joseph Lennon	Agricultural Panel	Fine Gael	
Charles McDonald	Agricultural Panel	Fine Gael	
Martin O'Toole	Agricultural Panel	Fianna Fáil	
Michael Quealy	Agricultural Panel	Fine Gael	
William Ryan	Agricultural Panel	Fianna Fáil	
Séamus de Brún	Cultural and Educational Panel	Fianna Fáil	
Brian Fleming	Cultural and Educational Panel	Fine Gael	
Joachim Loughrey	Cultural and Educational Panel	Fine Gael	
Helena McAuliffe-Ennis	Cultural and Educational Panel	Labour	Joined the Progressive Democrats in 1986
Michael Smith	Cultural and Educational Panel	Fianna Fáil	Elected to the 25th Dáil at the general election on 17 February 1987
Timmy Conway	Industrial and Commercial Panel	Labour	Joined the Progressive Democrats in 1986
Jack Daly	Industrial and Commercial Panel	Fine Gael	
Seán Fallon	Industrial and Commercial Panel	Fianna Fáil	
Alexis FitzGerald	Industrial and Commercial Panel	Fine Gael	
Jack Fitzsimons	Industrial and Commercial Panel	Fianna Fáil	
Michael Howard	Industrial and Commercial Panel	Fine Gael	
Mick Lanigan	Industrial and Commercial Panel	Fianna Fáil	
Patrick J. Reynolds	Industrial and Commercial Panel	Fine Gael	
Eoin Ryan	Industrial and Commercial Panel	Fianna Fáil	
Donie Cassidy	Labour Panel	Fianna Fáil	
Denis Cregan	Labour Panel	Fine Gael	
Des Hanafin	Labour Panel	Fianna Fáil	
Jack Harte	Labour Panel	Labour	
Jim Higgins	Labour Panel	Fine Gael	Elected to the 25th Dáil at the general election on 17 February 1987
Brian Hillery	Labour Panel	Fianna Fáil	
Peter Kelleher	Labour Panel	Fine Gael	
Mark Killilea	Labour Panel	Fianna Fáil	
Larry McMahon	Labour Panel	Fine Gael	
Brian Mullooly	Labour Panel	Fianna Fáil	
Andy O'Brien	Labour Panel	Fine Gael	
James Dooge	National University of Ireland	Fine Gael	Leader of the Seanad
Michael D. Higgins	National University of Ireland	Labour	Elected to the 25th Dáil at the general election on 17 February 1987
Brendan Ryan	National University of Ireland	Independent	
Catherine McGuinness	Dublin University	Independent	
Mary Robinson	Dublin University	Labour	
Shane Ross	Dublin University	Independent	
John Browne	Nominated by the Taoiseach	Fine Gael	
John Connor	Nominated by the Taoiseach	Fine Gael	
Jimmy Deenihan	Nominated by the Taoiseach	Fine Gael	Elected to the 25th Dáil at the general election on 17 February 1987
Patrick Durcan	Nominated by the Taoiseach	Fine Gael	
Brendan Howlin	Nominated by the Taoiseach	Labour	Elected to the 25th Dáil at the general election on 17 February 1987
Christy Kirwan	Nominated by the Taoiseach	Labour	
Pat Magner	Nominated by the Taoiseach	Labour	
Stephen McGonagle	Nominated by the Taoiseach	Independent	
Seán O'Leary	Nominated by the Taoiseach	Fine Gael	
John Robb	Nominated by the Taoiseach	Independent	
Bríd Rodgers	Nominated by the Taoiseach	Independent	
Nuala Fennell	Nominated by the Taoiseach	Fine Gael	Nominated on 20 February 1987 to fill vacancy after the general election
Paddy O'Toole	Nominated by the Taoiseach	Fine Gael	Nominated on 20 February 1987 to fill vacancy after the general election

== Changes ==
Date	Panel	Loss	Gain	Note
9 February 1983	Administrative Panel	Fianna Fáil	Independent	Martin O'Donoghue resigns from parliamentary party after opposition to leader emerged from Irish phone tapping scandal
18 November 1985	Dublin University	Labour	Independent	Mary Robinson resigns in disagreement over Anglo-Irish Agreement
4 January 1986	Cultural and Educational Panel	Labour	Progressive Democrats	Helena McAuliffe-Ennis changes party
17 April 1986	Industrial and Commercial Panel	Labour	Progressive Democrats	Timmy Conway changes party
January 1987	Administrative Panel	Independent	Progressive Democrats	Martin O'Donoghue joins party
17 February 1987	Administrative Panel	Fianna Fáil		Michael Lynch elected to the 25th Dáil at the 1987 general election
17 February 1987	Agricultural Panel	Fianna Fáil		John Ellis elected to the 25th Dáil at the 1987 general election
17 February 1987	Cultural and Educational Panel	Fianna Fáil		Michael Smith elected to the 25th Dáil at the 1987 general election
17 February 1987	Labour Panel	Fine Gael		Jim Higgins elected to the 25th Dáil at the 1987 general election
17 February 1987	National University	Labour		Michael D. Higgins elected to the 25th Dáil at the 1987 general election
17 February 1987	Nominated by the Taoiseach	Fine Gael		Jimmy Deenihan elected to the 25th Dáil at the 1987 general election
17 February 1987	Nominated by the Taoiseach	Labour		Brendan Howlin elected to the 25th Dáil at the 1987 general election
20 February 1987	Nominated by the Taoiseach		Fine Gael	Nuala Fennell nominated to fill vacancy after the general election
20 February 1987	Nominated by the Taoiseach		Fine Gael	Paddy O'Toole nominated to fill vacancy after the general election
