= 19th Seanad =

Members of the Seanad from 1989 to 1993

←	18th Seanad	20th Seanad	→

Overview
- Legislative body: Seanad Éireann
- Jurisdiction: Ireland
- Meeting place: Leinster House
- Term: 1 November 1989 – 17 December 1992
- Government: 21st government of Ireland (1989–1992); 22nd government of Ireland (1992–1993)
- Members: 60
- Cathaoirleach: Seán Doherty (FF) (1989–1992); Seán Fallon (FF) (1992–1993)
- Leas-Chathaoirleach: Liam Naughten (FG)
- Leader of the Seanad: Mick Lanigan (FF) (1987–1990); Seán Fallon (FF) (1990–1992); G. V. Wright (FF) (1992–1993)

The 19th Seanad was in office from 1989 to 1993. An election to Seanad Éireann, the senate of the Oireachtas (Irish parliament), followed the 1989 general election to the 26th Dáil. The senators served until the close of poll for the 20th Seanad in 1993.

== Cathaoirleach ==
On 1 November 1989, Seán Doherty (FF) was proposed as Cathaoirleach by Mick Lanigan (FF) and seconded by Patrick McGowan (FF). Avril Doyle (FG) was proposed by Maurice Manning (FG) and seconded by Charles McDonald (FG). John A. Murphy (Ind) was nominated by David Norris (Ind) and seconded by Brendan Ryan (Ind). Doherty was elected by a vote of 32 to 25.

On 8 November 1989, Liam Naughten (FG) was proposed as Leas-Chathaoirleach by Myles Staunton (FG) and seconded by Pól Ó Foighil (FG). Jack Harte (Lab) was proposed by Pat Upton (Lab) and seconded by Joe Costello (Lab). Naughten was elected by a vote of 15 to 10.

On 22 January 1992, Doherty resigned as Cathaoirleach after comments he made in relation to the phone tapping scandal, which would lead to the resignation of Charles Haughey as taoiseach on 11 February. On 23 January, Seán Fallon (FF) was proposed by G. V. Wright (FF) and seconded by Tras Honan (FF). He was elected without a division. Fallon won a contest against Des Hanafin, Tras Honan and Willie Farrell to be the Fianna Fáil nominee for the post.

== Composition of the 19th Seanad ==
There are a total of 60 seats in the Seanad: 43 were elected on five vocational panels, 6 were elected from two university constituencies and 11 were nominated by the Taoiseach.

The following table shows the composition by party when the 19th Seanad first met on 1 November 1989.

Origin Party	Vocational panels					NUI	DU	Nominated	Total
Origin Party	Admin	Agri	Cult & Educ	Ind & Comm	Labour	NUI	DU	Nominated	Total
Fianna Fáil	4	6	3	5	6	0	0	8	32
Fine Gael	2	4	2	3	4	0	0	0	15
Labour Party	1	1	0	1	1	0	0	0	4
Progressive Democrats	0	0	0	0	0	0	0	3	3
Independent	0	0	0	0	0	3	3	0	6
Total	7	11	5	9	11	3	3	11	60

== List of senators ==
- Note: The entries for Senators who were elected or appointed to fill vacancies are shown in italics

Name	Panel	Party	Notes
Joe Costello	Administrative Panel	Labour	Elected to 27th Dáil at general election on 25 November 1992
Seán Doherty	Administrative Panel	Fianna Fáil	Elected to 27th Dáil at general election on 25 November 1992
Michael Finneran	Administrative Panel	Fianna Fáil	
Seán Haughey	Administrative Panel	Fianna Fáil	Elected to 27th Dáil at general election on 25 November 1992
Tras Honan	Administrative Panel	Fianna Fáil	
Patrick Kennedy	Administrative Panel	Fine Gael	
Tom Raftery	Administrative Panel	Fine Gael	
Avril Doyle	Agricultural Panel	Fine Gael	Elected to 27th Dáil at general election on 25 November 1992
Tom Fitzgerald	Agricultural Panel	Fianna Fáil	
Richard Hourigan	Agricultural Panel	Fine Gael	
Thomas Hussey	Agricultural Panel	Fianna Fáil	
Rory Kiely	Agricultural Panel	Fianna Fáil	
Seán McCarthy	Agricultural Panel	Fianna Fáil	
Charles McDonald	Agricultural Panel	Fine Gael	
Pat Upton	Agricultural Panel	Labour	Elected to 27th Dáil at general election on 25 November 1992
Patrick McGowan	Agricultural Panel	Fianna Fáil	
Liam Naughten	Agricultural Panel	Fine Gael	
Francis O'Brien	Agricultural Panel	Fianna Fáil	
Seán Byrne	Cultural and Educational Panel	Fianna Fáil	
Maurice Manning	Cultural and Educational Panel	Fine Gael	
Paschal Mooney	Cultural and Educational Panel	Fianna Fáil	
Éamon Ó Cuív	Cultural and Educational Panel	Fianna Fáil	Elected to 27th Dáil at general election on 25 November 1992
Joe O'Reilly	Cultural and Educational Panel	Fine Gael	
Eddie Bohan	Industrial and Commercial Panel	Fianna Fáil	
Richard Conroy	Industrial and Commercial Panel	Fianna Fáil	
Liam T. Cosgrave	Industrial and Commercial Panel	Fine Gael	
Seán Fallon	Industrial and Commercial Panel	Fianna Fáil	
Willie Farrell	Industrial and Commercial Panel	Fianna Fáil	
Denis Foley	Industrial and Commercial Panel	Fianna Fáil	Elected to 27th Dáil at general election on 25 November 1992
Michael Howard	Industrial and Commercial Panel	Fine Gael	
John Ryan	Industrial and Commercial Panel	Labour	Elected to 27th Dáil at general election on 25 November 1992
Myles Staunton	Industrial and Commercial Panel	Fine Gael	
Donie Cassidy	Labour Panel	Fianna Fáil	
Des Hanafin	Labour Panel	Fianna Fáil	
Jack Harte	Labour Panel	Labour	
Mary Jackman	Labour Panel	Fine Gael	
Dan Kiely	Labour Panel	Fianna Fáil	
Don Lydon	Labour Panel	Fianna Fáil	
Larry McMahon	Labour Panel	Fine Gael	
Brian Mullooly	Labour Panel	Fianna Fáil	
Dan Neville	Labour Panel	Fine Gael	
Pól Ó Foighil	Labour Panel	Fine Gael	
Batt O'Keeffe	Labour Panel	Fianna Fáil	Elected to 27th Dáil at general election on 25 November 1992
John A. Murphy	National University of Ireland	Independent	
Joe O'Toole	National University of Ireland	Independent	
Brendan Ryan	National University of Ireland	Independent	
Carmencita Hederman	Dublin University	Independent	
David Norris	Dublin University	Independent	
Shane Ross	Dublin University	Independent	
Olga Bennett	Nominated by the Taoiseach	Fianna Fáil	
Hugh Byrne	Nominated by the Taoiseach	Fianna Fáil	Elected to 27th Dáil at general election on 25 November 1992
Martin Cullen	Nominated by the Taoiseach	Progressive Democrats	Elected to 27th Dáil at general election on 25 November 1992
Brendan Daly	Nominated by the Taoiseach	Fianna Fáil	Nominated on 3 December 1992 to fill vacancy
John Dardis	Nominated by the Taoiseach	Progressive Democrats	
Pat Farrell	Nominated by the Taoiseach	Fianna Fáil	Nominated on 3 December 1992 to fill vacancy
Helen Keogh	Nominated by the Taoiseach	Progressive Democrats	Elected to 27th Dáil at general election on 25 November 1992
Mick Lanigan	Nominated by the Taoiseach	Fianna Fáil	
Terry Leyden	Nominated by the Taoiseach	Fianna Fáil	Nominated on 3 December 1992 to fill vacancy
Tony McKenna	Nominated by the Taoiseach	Fianna Fáil	
Denis O'Donovan	Nominated by the Taoiseach	Fianna Fáil	
Donal Ormonde	Nominated by the Taoiseach	Fianna Fáil	
Dick Roche	Nominated by the Taoiseach	Fianna Fáil	Nominated on 3 December 1992 to fill vacancy
Eoin Ryan	Nominated by the Taoiseach	Fianna Fáil	Elected to 27th Dáil at general election on 25 November 1992
G. V. Wright	Nominated by the Taoiseach	Fianna Fáil	Leader of the Seanad from 23 January 1992

== Changes ==
Date	Panel	Loss	Gain	Note
25 November 1992	Nominated by the Taoiseach	Fianna Fáil		Hugh Byrne elected to 27th Dáil at 1992 general election
25 November 1992	Administrative Panel	Labour		Joe Costello elected to 27th Dáil at 1992 general election
25 November 1992	Nominated by the Taoiseach	Progressive Democrats		Martin Cullen elected to 27th Dáil at 1992 general election
25 November 1992	Administrative Panel	Fianna Fáil		Seán Doherty elected to 27th Dáil at 1992 general election
25 November 1992	Agricultural Panel	Fine Gael		Avril Doyle elected to 27th Dáil at 1992 general election
25 November 1992	Industrial and Commercial Panel	Fianna Fáil		Denis Foley elected to 27th Dáil at 1992 general election
25 November 1992	Administrative Panel	Fianna Fáil		Seán Haughey elected to 27th Dáil at 1992 general election
25 November 1992	Nominated by the Taoiseach	Progressive Democrats		Helen Keogh elected to 27th Dáil at 1992 general election
25 November 1992	Cultural and Educational Panel	Fianna Fáil		Éamon Ó Cuív elected to 27th Dáil at 1992 general election
25 November 1992	Labour Panel	Fianna Fáil		Batt O'Keeffe elected to 27th Dáil at 1992 general election
25 November 1992	Nominated by the Taoiseach	Fianna Fáil		Eoin Ryan elected to 27th Dáil at 1992 general election
25 November 1992	Industrial and Commercial Panel	Labour		John Ryan elected to 27th Dáil at 1992 general election
25 November 1992	Agricultural Panel	Labour		Pat Upton elected to 27th Dáil at 1992 general election
3 December 1992	Nominated by the Taoiseach		Fianna Fáil	Brendan Daly nominated to fill vacancy after the 1992 general election
3 December 1992	Nominated by the Taoiseach		Fianna Fáil	Pat Farrell nominated to fill vacancy after the 1992 general election
3 December 1992	Nominated by the Taoiseach		Fianna Fáil	Terry Leyden nominated to fill vacancy after the 1992 general election
3 December 1992	Nominated by the Taoiseach		Fianna Fáil	Dick Roche nominated to fill vacancy after the 1992 general election

== Sources ==
- "19th Seanad". Houses of the Oireachtas.
- "19th Seanad". Oireachtas Debates.
