= Maurice O'Connell (Fine Gael politician) =

Irish politician (1936–2016)

Senator
- In office 8 October 1981 – 23 February 1983
- Constituency: Labour Panel

Personal details
- Born: 20 October 1936 Penang, Malaysia
- Died: 6 April 2016 (aged 79) Tralee, County Kerry, Ireland
- Party: Fine Gael
- Spouse: Anne Marie Gillespie (m. 1961)
- Children: 6
- Relatives: William Hickie (great uncle)

Maurice Hugh O'Connell (20 October 1936 – 6 April 2016) was a senator in Ireland. He was born in Penang, Malaysia.

He was a member of the Dublin City Council from 1967 to 1973. At the 1969 general election, he stood unsuccessfully as an independent candidate in the Dublin South-Central constituency.

He later joined Fine Gael and served in the Seanad from 1981 to 1983, elected to the short-lived 15th Seanad and 16th Seanad on the Labour Panel. He was defeated in the 1983 election to the 17th Seanad.

His great uncle William Hickie served as a senator from 1925 to 1936.

O'Connell died in Tralee on 6 April 2016, at the age of 79.

== See also ==
- Families in the Oireachtas
- The O'Connells of Fossa, by Elizabeth O'Connell, page 60.
