= Gilbert Hughes =

Irish politician

Senator
- In office 27 April 1938 – 7 September 1938
- Constituency: Labour Panel

Personal details
- Died: 2 October 1985 (age 68–69)
- Party: Fianna Fáil

Gilbert Hughes (by 1917 (Note: Hughes must have been over 21 to run in the 1938 Seanad election.)–2 October 1985) was an Irish Fianna Fáil politician (Note: The Oireachtas database lists Hughes as independent. The nominating body subpanel was initially envisaged as non-partisan.) who served as a senator in the brief 2nd Seanad of 1938, and as a member of Dublin City Council from 1948 until 1969.

Hughes worked as a labourer and later an insurance agent; he lived in North Wall and later Raheny in Dublin. He joined Fianna Fáil in the 1920s. (Note: In January 1948 he told The Irish Press he had been a member for twenty years.) He supported Éamon de Valera at the party's 1933 ardfheis regarding the replacement of the Free State Seanad, and welcomed de Valera to the party's aeríocht in Dalymount Park in 1935. In 1937 he was Secretary of the North Dock party cumann that objected to Kathleen Clarke's criticism of the new Constitution.

In March 1938, the first election was held for the Seanad created by the Constitution. The Labour Party and Irish Congress of Trade Unions boycotted the election in protest at the inclusion of the tiny pro-Fianna Fáil Ballingarry Cottage Tenants' Association as a nominating body on the Labour Panel. In consequence, de Valera as Taoiseach was required to add three names to the nominating bodies subpanel of the Labour Panel to reach the minimum of six candidates. Hughes was one of these three. Under the rules of the time, the 132 candidates from all ten subpanels were listed on a single ballot, with the 43 senators indirectly elected via single transferable vote by an electoral college comprising 330 public representatives. Hughes was elected despite receiving zero first preferences, by receiving more transfers than one of the three Ballingarry Cottage Tenants' Association candidates. As a senator, he voted for Pádraic Ó Máille as Leas-Cathaoirleach, and spoke against a commission of inquiry on agriculture, but in favour of a select committee on rural labourers. He expressed little hope for vocational organisation but did not oppose de Valera's proposed commission on the topic.

The 2nd Seanad was dissolved after the June 1938 Dáil election. Hughes did not stand in the August 1938 election for the 3rd Seanad, which was not subject to a Labour boycott. He stood unsuccessfully on the Labour Panel in the 1943 and 1948 Seanad elections.

Hughes stood unsuccessfully in the 1945 election to Dublin City Council in the No. 2 local electoral area. When his successful party running mate, J. J. Hannon, died in 1948, Hughes was co-opted to fill the casual vacancy. He retained his seat at the local elections of 1950, 1955, 1960, and 1967. He was among those who nominated Charles Haughey to stand in the 1954 general election. In 1958 he opposed the removal of the An Tóstal monument from O'Connell Bridge. At the 1959 Fianna Fáil ardfheis he alleged people in Dublin were dying after failing the means test for public medical care; the Dublin Board of Assistance publicly asked him for more evidence. In 1960 he was appointed to the council's Health Authority. Hughes remained on the city council until Kevin Boland as Minister for Local Government dissolved it in 1969 for failing to strike an adequate rate. The city was administered by an appointed commissioner, John Garvin. Fianna Fáil councillors supported the dissolution, whereas the majority argued the Fianna Fáil government contributed proportionately less from the Central Fund to Dublin Health Authority than to other local authorities.

In 1972 Hughes, no longer a councillor but still a peace commissioner, corresponded with Taoiseach Jack Lynch and minister George Colley about the Fifth Amendment of the Constitution, which removed the "special position of the Catholic Church". After the 1973 general election, minister Jim Tully replaced John Garvin with a panel of commissioners comprising the former city councillors, to serve until the council was restored after the 1974 local election, in which Hughes did not stand.
