= John Gaffney =

John Gaffney may refer to:

- John Gaffney (baseball) (1855–1913), American baseball umpire and manager
- John Gaffney (politician) (active 1938), Irish politician
- John F. Gaffney (1934–1995), American politician
- John Gaffney (actor) (active since 1994), Scottish actor
