= 2nd Seanad =

Members of the Seanad in 1938

←	1934 Seanad	3rd Seanad	→

Overview
- Legislative body: Seanad Éireann
- Jurisdiction: Ireland
- Meeting place: Leinster House
- Term: 27 April 1938 – 22 July 1938
- Government: 1st Government of Ireland
- Members: 60
- Cathaoirleach: Seán Gibbons (FF)
- Leas-Chathaoirleach: Pádraic Ó Máille (FF)
- Leader of the Seanad: William Quirke (FF)

The 2nd Seanad was in office in 1938. An election to Seanad Éireann, the Senate of the Oireachtas (Irish parliament), took place in March 1938, following the coming into operation of the Constitution of Ireland in December 1937. The senators served until the close of poll for the 3rd Seanad, in July 1938.

== Designation ==
The Seanad of the Irish Free State was abolished by the Constitution (Amendment No. 24) Act 1936, with its last meeting on 19 May 1936. The Free State Seanad was elected in stages and thus considered to be in permanent session. Although there were five Seanad elections held before its abolition, the First Seanad includes the entire period from 1922 to 1936.

A new Seanad Éireann was established under the 1937 Constitution, with elections following general elections to Dáil Éireann. To indicate continuity with its Free State predecessor, the first Seanad elected after 1937 is numbered as the Second Seanad. The election to the 2nd Seanad was elected under Article 53 of the Constitution, which provided that on the coming into operation of the Constitution, which took place on 29 December 1937, a general election for the Seanad would take place as if there had been a dissolution of the Dáil.

== Cathaoirleach ==
On 27 April 1938, Seán Gibbons (FF) was proposed by Helena Concannon (FF) and seconded by Margaret Mary Pearse (FF) for the position of Cathaoirleach. Séamus Ó hEocha (Ind) was proposed by Michael Hayes (FG) and seconded by Michael Tierney (FG) for the position. Gibbons was elected by a vote of 29 to 26.

On 11 May 1938, Pádraic Ó Máille (FF), who had served as Leas-Cheann Comhairle of Dáil Éireann from 1922 to 1927, was proposed by Seán Hayes (FF) and seconded by Peadar Toner Mac Fhionnlaoich (Ind) for the position of Leas-Chathaoirleach. Ó Máille was elected by a vote of 30 to 23.

== Composition of the 2nd Seanad ==
There are a total of 60 seats in the Seanad: 43 were elected on five vocational panels, 6 were elected from two university constituencies and 11 were nominated by the Taoiseach.

The following table shows the composition by party when the 2nd Seanad first met on 27 April 1938.

Origin Party	Vocational panels					NUI	DU	Nominated	Total
Origin Party	Admin	Agri	Cult & Educ	Ind & Comm	Labour	NUI	DU	Nominated	Total
Fianna Fáil	3	4	1	3	2	1	0	7	21
Fine Gael	2	3	3	5	2	2	0	0	17
Labour Party	0	0	0	0	1	0	0	0	1
Independent	2	4	1	1	6	0	3	4	21
Total	7	11	5	9	11	3	3	11	60

== List of senators ==
Senators elected at the April 1938 Seanad election
Panel or constituency	Name	Party
Administrative Panel	Christopher Byrne	Fianna Fáil
Administrative Panel	Thomas Condon	Independent
Administrative Panel	Michael Hayes	Fine Gael
Administrative Panel	Richard Mulcahy	Fine Gael
Administrative Panel	John Newcome	Independent
Administrative Panel	Margaret Mary Pearse	Fianna Fáil
Administrative Panel	Thomas Ruane	Fianna Fáil
Administrative Panel	Patrick Baxter	Fine Gael
Administrative Panel	William Caffrey	Fine Gael
Administrative Panel	Seán Gibbons	Fianna Fáil
Administrative Panel	John Nassau Greene	Independent
Administrative Panel	Patrick Kehoe	Fianna Fáil
Administrative Panel	Ross McGillycuddy	Independent
Administrative Panel	William O'Callaghan	Fine Gael
Administrative Panel	Martin O'Dwyer	Independent
Administrative Panel	Pádraic Ó Máille	Fianna Fáil
Administrative Panel	William Quirke	Fianna Fáil
Administrative Panel	Michael Twomey	Independent
Cultural and Educational Panel	Patrick Doyle	Fine Gael
Cultural and Educational Panel	Seán O'Donovan	Fianna Fáil
Cultural and Educational Panel	Séamus Ó hEocha	Independent
Cultural and Educational Panel	Gearóid O'Sullivan	Fine Gael
Cultural and Educational Panel	James Parkinson	Fine Gael
Industrial and Commercial Panel	Daniel Corkery	Fianna Fáil
Industrial and Commercial Panel	James Crosbie	Fine Gael
Industrial and Commercial Panel	James G. Douglas	Independent
Industrial and Commercial Panel	Michael Hearne	Fianna Fáil
Industrial and Commercial Panel	Cornelius Kennedy	Fine Gael
Industrial and Commercial Panel	John MacLoughlin	Fine Gael
Industrial and Commercial Panel	Linda Kearns MacWhinney	Fianna Fáil
Industrial and Commercial Panel	David Madden	Fine Gael
Industrial and Commercial Panel	Brian O'Rourke	Fine Gael
Labour Panel	John Butler	Fine Gael
Labour Panel	Michael Conway	Independent
Labour Panel	John Gaffney	Independent
Labour Panel	Frederick Hawkins	Independent
Labour Panel	Seán Hayes	Fianna Fáil
Labour Panel	Gilbert Hughes	Fianna Fáil
Labour Panel	James Johnston	Independent
Labour Panel	Thomas McShea	Independent
Labour Panel	Seán Milroy	Fine Gael
Labour Panel	James Tunney	Labour
Labour Panel	David Walsh	Independent
Dublin University	Ernest Alton	Independent
Dublin University	Joseph Johnston	Independent
Dublin University	Robert Rowlette	Independent
National University of Ireland	Henry Barniville	Fine Gael
National University of Ireland	Helena Concannon	Fianna Fáil
National University of Ireland	Michael Tierney	Fine Gael
Nominated by the Taoiseach	Robert Farnan	Fianna Fáil
Nominated by the Taoiseach	T. V. Honan	Fianna Fáil
Nominated by the Taoiseach	Douglas Hyde	Independent
Nominated by the Taoiseach	Sir John Keane	Independent
Nominated by the Taoiseach	Margaret L. Kennedy	Fianna Fáil
Nominated by the Taoiseach	Peadar Toner Mac Fhionnlaoich	Independent
Nominated by the Taoiseach	William Magennis	Independent
Nominated by the Taoiseach	Frank MacDermot	Independent
Nominated by the Taoiseach	Maurice George Moore	Fianna Fáil
Nominated by the Taoiseach	David Robinson	Fianna Fáil
Nominated by the Taoiseach	Matthew Stafford	Fianna Fáil

== Changes ==
Date	Panel	Loss	Gain	Note
4 May 1938	Nominated by the Taoiseach	Independent		Douglas Hyde elected as President of Ireland
10 May 1938	Nominated by the Taoiseach		Independent	Patrick Keohane nominated to replace Douglas Hyde
17 June 1938	Administrative Panel	Fine Gael		Richard Mulcahy elected to the 10th Dáil at the 1938 general election
