= Thomas Kilbride =

Thomas Kilbride may refer to:

- Thomas L. Kilbride (born 1953), American judge: Justice on the Supreme Court of Illinois
- Thomas Kilbride (politician) (1911–1986), Irish Fine Gael politician
