= Donal Ormonde =

Irish former politician (born 1943)

Senator
- In office 1 November 1989 – 17 February 1993
- Constituency: Nominated by the Taoiseach

Teachta Dála
- In office November 1982 – February 1987
- Constituency: Waterford

Personal details
- Born: 21 January 1943 (age 83) County Waterford, Ireland
- Party: Fianna Fáil
- Parent: John Ormonde (father)

Donal Ormonde (born 21 January 1943) is an Irish former Fianna Fáil politician and radiologist. He first stood for election to Dáil Éireann at the February 1982 general election, in the Waterford constituency, but was unsuccessful. He won a seat there at the November 1982 general election, but lost it at the 1987 general election. He was nominated by the Taoiseach in 1989 to the 19th Seanad.

His father John Ormonde was a Fianna Fáil TD for Waterford from 1947 to 1965.

== See also ==
- Families in the Oireachtas

| Dáil | Election | Deputy (Party) | Deputy (Party) | Deputy (Party) | Deputy (Party) |
|---|---|---|---|---|---|
| 4th | 1923 | Caitlín Brugha (Rep) | John Butler (Lab) | Nicholas Wall (FP) | William Redmond (NL) |
| 5th | 1927 (Jun) | Caitlín Brugha (Rep) | Patrick Little (FF) | Vincent White (CnaG) | William Redmond (NL) |
| 6th | 1927 (Sep) | Seán Goulding (FF) | Patrick Little (FF) | Vincent White (CnaG) | William Redmond (NL) |
| 7th | 1932 | Seán Goulding (FF) | Patrick Little (FF) | John Kiersey (CnaG) | William Redmond (CnaG) |
| 8th | 1933 | Seán Goulding (FF) | Patrick Little (FF) | Nicholas Wall (NCP) | Bridget Redmond (CnaG) |
| 9th | 1937 | Michael Morrissey (FF) | Patrick Little (FF) | Nicholas Wall (FG) | Bridget Redmond (FG) |
| 10th | 1938 | Michael Morrissey (FF) | Patrick Little (FF) | William Broderick (FG) | Bridget Redmond (FG) |
| 11th | 1943 | Michael Morrissey (FF) | Patrick Little (FF) | Denis Heskin (CnaT) | Bridget Redmond (FG) |
| 12th | 1944 | Michael Morrissey (FF) | Patrick Little (FF) | Denis Heskin (CnaT) | Bridget Redmond (FG) |
| 12th | 1947 by-election | John Ormonde (FF) | Patrick Little (FF) | Denis Heskin (CnaT) | Bridget Redmond (FG) |
| 13th | 1948 | John Ormonde (FF) | Patrick Little (FF) | Thomas Kyne (Lab) | Bridget Redmond (FG) |
| 14th | 1951 | John Ormonde (FF) | Patrick Little (FF) | Thomas Kyne (Lab) | Bridget Redmond (FG) |
| 14th | 1952 by-election | John Ormonde (FF) | Patrick Little (FF) | Thomas Kyne (Lab) | William Kenneally (FF) |
| 15th | 1954 | John Ormonde (FF) | Thaddeus Lynch (FG) | Thomas Kyne (Lab) | William Kenneally (FF) |
| 16th | 1957 | John Ormonde (FF) | Thaddeus Lynch (FG) | Thomas Kyne (Lab) | William Kenneally (FF) |
| 17th | 1961 | John Ormonde (FF) | Thaddeus Lynch (FG) | Thomas Kyne (Lab) | 3 seats 1961–1977 |
| 18th | 1965 | Billy Kenneally (FF) | Thaddeus Lynch (FG) | Thomas Kyne (Lab) | 3 seats 1961–1977 |
| 18th | 1966 by-election | Billy Kenneally (FF) | Fad Browne (FF) | Thomas Kyne (Lab) | 3 seats 1961–1977 |
| 19th | 1969 | Billy Kenneally (FF) | Fad Browne (FF) | Edward Collins (FG) | 3 seats 1961–1977 |
| 20th | 1973 | Billy Kenneally (FF) | Thomas Kyne (Lab) | Edward Collins (FG) | 3 seats 1961–1977 |
| 21st | 1977 | Billy Kenneally (FF) | Jackie Fahey (FF) | Edward Collins (FG) | Austin Deasy (FG) |
| 22nd | 1981 | Billy Kenneally (FF) | Jackie Fahey (FF) | Edward Collins (FG) | Austin Deasy (FG) |
| 23rd | 1982 (Feb) | Paddy Gallagher (SF–WP) | Jackie Fahey (FF) | Edward Collins (FG) | Austin Deasy (FG) |
| 24th | 1982 (Nov) | Donal Ormonde (FF) | Jackie Fahey (FF) | Edward Collins (FG) | Austin Deasy (FG) |
| 25th | 1987 | Martin Cullen (PDs) | Jackie Fahey (FF) | Brian Swift (FF) | Austin Deasy (FG) |
| 26th | 1989 | Brian O'Shea (Lab) | Jackie Fahey (FF) | Brendan Kenneally (FF) | Austin Deasy (FG) |
| 27th | 1992 | Brian O'Shea (Lab) | Martin Cullen (PDs) | Brendan Kenneally (FF) | Austin Deasy (FG) |
| 28th | 1997 | Brian O'Shea (Lab) | Martin Cullen (FF) | Brendan Kenneally (FF) | Austin Deasy (FG) |
| 29th | 2002 | Brian O'Shea (Lab) | Martin Cullen (FF) | Ollie Wilkinson (FF) | John Deasy (FG) |
| 30th | 2007 | Brian O'Shea (Lab) | Martin Cullen (FF) | Brendan Kenneally (FF) | John Deasy (FG) |
| 31st | 2011 | Ciara Conway (Lab) | John Halligan (Ind.) | Paudie Coffey (FG) | John Deasy (FG) |
| 32nd | 2016 | David Cullinane (SF) | John Halligan (Ind.) | Mary Butler (FF) | John Deasy (FG) |
| 33rd | 2020 | David Cullinane (SF) | Marc Ó Cathasaigh (GP) | Mary Butler (FF) | Matt Shanahan (Ind.) |
| 34th | 2024 | David Cullinane (SF) | Conor D. McGuinness (SF) | Mary Butler (FF) | John Cummins (FG) |
