= 1947 Waterford by-election =

By-election to the 12th Dáil

- 29 October 1947
- Turnout: 32,222 (63.2%)
	Ormonde	Sheehan	Kyne
Nominee	John Ormonde	Nicholas Sheehan	Thomas Kyne
Party	Fianna Fáil	Fine Gael	Labour
First preferences	11,840	9,941	7,683
Percentage	36.8%	30.9%	23.8%
Final count	15,318	12,565	–
TD before election
Michael Morrissey
Fianna Fáil
TD after election
John Ormonde
Fianna Fáil

A Dáil by-election was held in the constituency of Waterford in Ireland on Wednesday, 29 October 1947, to fill a vacancy in the 12th Dáil. It followed the death of Fianna Fáil Teachta Dála (TD) Michael Morrissey on 10 May 1947.

In 1947, Waterford was a four seat constituency comprising Waterford city and County Waterford, as well as several electoral divisions in County Cork.

The writ of election to fill the vacancy was agreed by the Dáil on 8 October 1947.

The by-election was won by the Fianna Fáil candidate John Ormonde. It was held on the same day as the 1947 Dublin County by-election and the 1947 Tipperary by-election. Two by-elections were won by Clann na Poblachta, and one by Fianna Fáil.

The third-place candidate, Thomas Kyne of Labour, was elected for Waterford at the 1948 general election.

== Result ==
1947 Waterford by-election
Party	Candidate	FPv%	Count		
Party	Candidate	FPv%	1	2	3
Fianna Fáil	John Ormonde	36.8	11,840	12,361	15,318
Fine Gael	Nicholas Sheehan	30.9	9,941	10,402	12,565
Labour	Thomas Kyne	23.8	7,683	8,906	
Clann na Poblachta	Seán Feeney	8.6	2,758		
Electorate: 51,008 Valid: 32,222 Quota: 16,112 Turnout: 63.2%
