= Pat Farrell =

Irish businessman and former politician

Senator
- In office 3 December 1992 – 17 February 1993
- Constituency: Nominated by the Taoiseach

Personal details
- Political party: Fianna Fáil

Patrick Farrell is an Irish businessman and a former chief executive of the Irish Banking Federation.

== Career ==
Farrell has been Head of Marketing and Communications and General Manager retail operations at EBS Building Society, Chief Executive at Galway's Galvia Private Hospital and General Manager at Sligo Regional Hospital. He is Chairman of Sightsavers International (Ireland) and is a board member of FOLD Ireland.

Farrell was appointed as Head of Group Corporate Communications and Government Relations at Bank of Ireland in May 2013. He retired in March 2019.

Farrell was the chief executive of the Irish Banking Federation. He was appointed in January 2004. As well as this he was a member of the executive committee of the European Banking Federation, representing the interests of commercial banks across the continent.

In March 2019, Farrell became chief executive of property group Irish Institutional Property.

== Political office ==
Farrell was General Secretary of Fianna Fáil between 1991 and 1997. In December 1992, he was nominated by the Taoiseach, Albert Reynolds as member of the outgoing 19th Seanad, serving until February 1993 for the 20th Seanad.
