= Michael Hearne =

Irish politician (died 1954)

Senator
- In office 8 September 1943 – 22 July 1954
- Constituency: Administrative Panel
- In office 27 April 1938 – 7 September 1938
- Constituency: Industrial and Commercial Panel

Personal details
- Died: 1954
- Political party: Fianna Fáil

Michael Hearne (died 1954) was an Irish Fianna Fáil politician. He was a member of Seanad Éireann from April to August 1938, and from 1943 to 1954.

He was first elected to the 2nd Seanad in April 1938 to the Industrial and Commercial Panel, but lost his seat at the August 1938 election. He was re-elected at the 1943 Seanad election to the Administrative Panel. He was again elected at the 1944, 1948 and 1951 elections until losing his seat at the 1954 election.
