= Tony Herbert =

Irish politician and hurler (1920–2014)

Senator
- In office 13 May 1982 – 23 February 1983
- In office 27 October 1977 – 8 October 1981
- Constituency: Labour Panel

Personal details
- Born: Matthew Anthony Herbert; 9 August 1920 Annacotty, County Limerick, Ireland
- Died: 6 March 2014 (aged 93) Churchtown, Dublin, Ireland
- Party: Fianna Fáil
- Occupation: Dublin Corporation official

Tony Herbert
Personal information
- Height: 5 ft 11 in (180 cm)

Sport
- Sport: Hurling
- Position: Full-forward
Clubs
- Years: Club
- Ahane; Faughs
Club titles
	Football	Hurling
Limerick titles	4	5
Inter-county
- Years: County
- 1939–1943 1944–1954: Limerick; Dublin
Inter-county titles
- Munster titles: 1
- Leinster titles: 2
- All-Irelands: 1
- NHL: 0

Matthew Anthony Herbert (9 August 1920 – 6 March 2014) was an Irish Fianna Fáil politician and hurler, who played as a full-forward for the Limerick senior team.

== Biography ==
Born in Castleconnell, County Limerick, Herbert first played competitive hurling while at school in Limerick CBS. He arrived on the inter-county scene at the age of seventeen when he first linked up with the Limerick minor team. He made his senior debut during the 1939 Oireachtas Cup. Herbert went on to play a key role for Limerick for a brief period, before later joining the Dublin senior team, and won one All-Ireland medal, two Leinster medals and one Munster medal. He was an All-Ireland runner-up on two occasions.

As a member of the Leinster inter-provincial team at various times throughout his career, Herbert ended his career without a Railway Cup medal. At club level he won five hurling championship and four football championship with Ahane, before later winning five hurling championship medals with Faughs.

Herbert's retirement came following the conclusion of the 1954 championship.

Whilst still a player, Herbert became involved in team management and coaching. He trained and coached the Dublin minor hurling team to Leinster success in 1952.

His uncle, Paddy Kenneally, was an All-Ireland medalist with Kerry in Gaelic football. Herbert's brothers, Seán and Michael, and his nephew, Turlough all played with Limerick.

Herbert was elected to Seanad Éireann in 1977 by the Labour Panel. He lost his seat at the 1981 election but was re-elected to the 16th Seanad at the 1982 election. He lost his seat again at the 1983 election.

At the time of his death Herbert was Limerick's oldest All-Ireland medalist, while he was also the last surviving member of the 1940 All-Ireland-winning team.

== Honours ==
=== Player ===
Limerick CBS

- Dean Ryan Cup (2): 1937, 1938 (c)

Ahane

- Limerick Senior Hurling Championship (5): 1936, 1937, 1938, 1939, 1942
- Limerick Senior Football Championship (4): 1936, 1937, 1938, 1939

Faughs

- Dublin Senior Hurling Championship (5): 1944, 1945, 1946, 1950, 1952

Limerick

- All-Ireland Senior Hurling Championship (1): 1940
- Munster Senior Hurling Championship (1): 1940
- Oireachtas Cup (1): 1939

Dublin

- Leinster Senior Hurling Championship (2): 1948, 1952
- Oireachtas Cup (1): 1948

=== Coach ===
Dublin

- Leinster Minor Hurling Championship (1): 1952

== See also ==
- Families in the Oireachtas
