= Labour Panel =

Seanad Éireann constituency

- Seanad Éireann constituency

Current constituency
- Created: 1938
- Seats: 11
- Senators: Chris Andrews (SF); Pat Casey (FF); Nessa Cosgrove (Lab); Gerard Craughwell (Ind); Mark Duffy (FG); Robbie Gallagher (FF); Mike Kennelly (FG); Maria McCormack (SF); Margaret Murphy O'Mahony (FF); Patricia Stephenson (SD); Joe O'Reilly (FG)

The Labour Panel is one of five vocational panels which together elect 43 of the 60 members of Seanad Éireann, the senate of the Oireachtas (the legislature of Ireland). The Labour Panel elects eleven senators.

== Election ==
Article 18 of the Constitution of Ireland provides that 43 of the 60 senators are to be elected from five vocational panels. The Labour Panel is defined in Article 18.7.1° (iii) as "Labour, whether organised or unorganised". The Seanad returning officer maintains a list of nominating bodies for each of the five panels. Candidates may be nominated either by four members of the Oireachtas or by a nominating body. The electorate consists of city and county councillors and current members of the Oireachtas. As the Seanad election takes place after the election to the Dáil, the Oireachtas members are the members of the incoming Dáil and the outgoing Seanad. Eleven senators are elected on the Labour Panel, at least four of whom must have been nominated by Oireachtas members and at least four must have been nominated by nominating bodies.

== Senators ==
Senators for the Labour Panel
Key to parties: CnaT = Clann na Talmhan; CnaP = Clann na Poblachta; DL = Democratic Left; FF = Fianna Fáil; FG = Fine Gael; Lab = Labour; SF = Sinn Féin; SD = Social Democrats; Ind. = Independent
Sen	Election	Senator (Party)	Senator (Party)	Senator (Party)	Senator (Party)	Senator (Party)	Senator (Party)	Senator (Party)	Senator (Party)	Senator (Party)	Senator (Party)	Senator (Party)
2nd	1938	John Butler (Lab)	James Tunney (Lab)	Michael Conway (Ind.)	John Gaffney (Ind.)	Gilbert Hughes (Ind.)	Thomas McShea (Ind.)	David Walsh (Ind.)	Frederick Hawkins (Ind.)	James Johnston (Ind.)	Seán Hayes (FF)	Seán Milroy (FG)
3rd	1938	John Butler (Lab)	James Tunney (Lab)	Seán Campbell (Lab)	William Cummins (Lab)	Thomas Foran (Lab)	Patrick Hogan (Lab)	Eamonn Lynch (Lab)	Frederick Hawkins (Ind.)	James Johnston (Ind.)	Seán Hayes (FF)	Peter Lynch (Ind.)
4th	1943	John Butler (Lab)	Thomas Hayden (Lab)	Thomas Kennedy (Note: Died on 18 September 1947.) (Lab)	Sam Kyle (Lab)	Thomas Foran (Lab)	Michael Colgan (Ind.)	Seán Ruane (Ind.)	Frederick Hawkins (Ind.)	James Johnston (Ind.)	Michael Smyth (Ind.)	Richard Mulcahy (FG)
5th	1944	John Butler (Lab)	Thomas Hayden (Lab)	Thomas Kennedy (Lab)	Sam Kyle (Lab)	James Tunney (Lab)	John Meighan (CnaT)	Seán Ruane (Ind.)	John Thomas Keane (Note: Died on 22 May 1946.) (Ind.)	James Johnston (Ind.)	Michael Smyth (Ind.)	Peter Lynch (Ind.)
5th	1946	John Butler (Lab)	Thomas Hayden (Lab)	Thomas Kennedy (Lab)	Sam Kyle (Lab)	James Tunney (Lab)	John Meighan (CnaT)	Seán Ruane (Ind.)	Frederick Hawkins (Note: Elected to Seanad at a by-election on 24 July 1946m) (Note: Died on 2 August 1956.) (Ind.)	James Johnston (Ind.)	Michael Smyth (Ind.)	Peter Lynch (Ind.)
6th	1948	John Butler (Lab)	Seán Campbell (Note: Died on 27 February 1950.) (Lab)	J. T. O'Farrell (Note: Resigned on 31 May 1950.) (Lab)	Richard Anthony (Ind.)	Michael Colgan (Note: Died on 22 June 1953.) (Ind.)	John Meighan (CnaT)	Seán Ruane (Ind.)	Frederick Hawkins (Ind.)	Seán Hayes (FF)	Michael Smyth (Ind.)	Andrew Fogarty (FF)
7th	1951	John Butler (Lab)	William McMullen (Lab)	Noel Hartnett (CnaP)	Pádraig Ághas (Ind.)	Michael Colgan (Ind.)	John Meighan (CnaT)	Seán Ruane (Ind.)	Frederick Hawkins (Ind.)	Seán Hayes (FF)	Daniel O'Rourke (FF)	Vincent McHugh (FG)
8th	1954	John Butler (Lab)	Patrick Crowley (Lab)	Dominick Murphy (Lab)	Patrick Tierney (Lab)	Richard Anthony (Ind.)	Frank Purcell (Note: Died on 2 April 1960.) (Ind.)	Seán Ruane (Ind.)	Frederick Hawkins (Ind.)	Seán Hayes (FF)	Liam Kelly (Ind.)	Victor Carton (FG)
9th	1957	Joe Sheridan (Ind.)	Patrick Crowley (Lab)	Dominick Murphy (Lab)	Liam Ahern (FF)	Frank Carter (FF)	Frank Purcell (Ind.)	Harry Colley (FF)	Eoin Ryan Snr (FF)	Seán Hayes (FF)	Ben O'Quigley (FG)	Victor Carton (FG)
9th	1960	Joe Sheridan (Ind.)	Patrick Crowley (Lab)	Dominick Murphy (Lab)	Liam Ahern (FF)	Frank Carter (FF)	Edward Browne (Note: Elected to Seanad at a by-election on 1 November 1960.) (Ind.)	Harry Colley (FF)	Eoin Ryan Snr (FF)	Seán Hayes (FF)	Ben O'Quigley (FG)	Victor Carton (FG)
10th	1961	John Butler (Lab)	Patrick Crowley (Lab)	Dominick Murphy (Lab)	Seán Brosnahan (Ind.)	Seán Browne (FF)	Joseph Farrell (FF)	Mark Killilea Snr (FF)	Michael Yeats (FF)	Seán Hayes (FF)	James Dooge (FG)	Victor Carton (FG)
11th	1965	Séamus Dolan (FF)	Patrick Crowley (Lab)	Dominick Murphy (Lab)	Seán Brosnahan (Ind.)	Seán Browne (FF)	Joseph Farrell (FF)	Mark Killilea Snr (FF)	John Ormonde (FF)	Vincent McHugh (FG)	James Dooge (FG)	Victor Carton (FG)
12th	1969	Jimmy Dunne (Note: Died on 23 February 1972.) (Lab)	Fintan Kennedy (Lab)	Evelyn Owens (Lab)	Seán Brosnahan (Ind.)	Des Hanafin (FF)	Joseph Farrell (FF)	Mark Killilea Jnr (FF)	Seán Walsh (FF)	John Boland (FG)	Michael Lyons (FG)	William O'Brien (FG)
13th	1973	Jack Harte (Lab)	Fintan Kennedy (Lab)	Evelyn Owens (Lab)	Seán Brosnahan (Ind.)	Des Hanafin (FF)	Séamus Dolan (FF)	Mark Killilea Jnr (FF)	Bernard Markey (FG)	John Boland (FG)	Michael Lyons (FG)	William O'Brien (FG)
14th	1977	Jack Harte (Lab)	Fintan Kennedy (Lab)	Joseph Dowling (FF)	Brian Hillery (FF)	Des Hanafin (FF)	Séamus Dolan (FF)	Tony Herbert (FF)	Bernard Markey (FG)	John Blennerhassett (FG)	Michael Lyons (FG)	Andy O'Brien (FG)
15th	1981	Jack Harte (Lab)	Dan Kiely (FF)	Brian Mullooly (FF)	Brian Hillery (FF)	Des Hanafin (FF)	Séamus Dolan (FF)	Toddie Byrne (FG)	Donal Carey (FG)	John Blennerhassett (FG)	Maurice O'Connell (FG)	Andy O'Brien (FG)
16th	1982	Jack Harte (Lab)	Tony Herbert (FF)	Brian Mullooly (FF)	Donie Cassidy (FF)	Des Hanafin (FF)	Mark Killilea Jnr (FF)	Toddie Byrne (FG)	Monica Barnes (FG)	Denis Cregan (FG)	Maurice O'Connell (FG)	Dick Dowling (FG)
17th	1983	Jack Harte (Lab)	Brian Hillery (FF)	Brian Mullooly (FF)	Donie Cassidy (FF)	Des Hanafin (FF)	Mark Killilea Jnr (FF)	Jim Higgins (FG)	Larry McMahon (FG)	Denis Cregan (FG)	Peter Kelleher (FG)	Andy O'Brien (FG)
18th	1987	Jack Harte (Lab)	Brian Hillery (FF)	Brian Mullooly (FF)	Donie Cassidy (FF)	Des Hanafin (FF)	Don Lydon (FF)	Dan Kiely (FF)	Larry McMahon (FG)	Denis Cregan (FG)	Peter Kelleher (FG)	Nuala Fennell (FG)
19th	1989	Jack Harte (Lab)	Batt O'Keeffe (FF)	Brian Mullooly (FF)	Donie Cassidy (FF)	Des Hanafin (FF)	Don Lydon (FF)	Dan Kiely (FF)	Larry McMahon (FG)	Mary Jackman (FG)	Dan Neville (FG)	Pól Ó Foighil (FG)
20th	1993	Seán Maloney (Lab)	Joe Sherlock (DL)	Brian Mullooly (FF)	Donie Cassidy (FF)	Frank Fahey (FF)	Don Lydon (FF)	Dan Kiely (FF)	Bill Cotter (FG)	Denis Cregan (FG)	Dan Neville (FG)	Jarlath McDonagh (FG)
21st	1997	Seán Ryan (Lab)	Liam Fitzgerald (Note: Resigned Fianna Fáil whip on 27 March 2007.) (FF)	Brian Mullooly (FF)	Donie Cassidy (FF)	Des Hanafin (FF)	Don Lydon (FF)	Dan Kiely (FF)	Mary Jackman (FG)	Denis Cregan (FG)	Therese Ridge (FG)	Jarlath McDonagh (FG)
21st	1998	John Cregan (Note: Elected to the Seanad at a by-election on 23 June 1998.) (FF)	Liam Fitzgerald (FF)	Brian Mullooly (FF)	Donie Cassidy (FF)	Des Hanafin (FF)	Don Lydon (FF)	Dan Kiely (FF)	Mary Jackman (FG)	Denis Cregan (FG)	Therese Ridge (FG)	Jarlath McDonagh (FG)
22nd	2002	Michael McCarthy (Lab)	Liam Fitzgerald (FF)	Brendan Daly (FF)	Geraldine Feeney (FF)	Terry Leyden (FF)	Don Lydon (FF)	John Hanafin (FF)	Fergal Browne (FG)	Maurice Cummins (FG)	Michael Finucane (FG)	Jim Higgins (FG)
23rd	2007	Michael McCarthy (Lab)	Phil Prendergast (Lab)	Donie Cassidy (FF)	Geraldine Feeney (FF)	Terry Leyden (FF)	Ned O'Sullivan (FF)	John Hanafin (FF)	Jerry Buttimer (FG)	Maurice Cummins (FG)	Frances Fitzgerald (FG)	Fidelma Healy Eames (Note: Fine Gael party whip removed on 16 July 2013.) (FG)
24th	2011	David Cullinane (SF)	Marie Moloney (Lab)	John Whelan (Lab)	Darragh O'Brien (FF)	Terry Leyden (FF)	Ned O'Sullivan (FF)	Terry Brennan (FG)	Cáit Keane (FG)	Maurice Cummins (FG)	Tony Mulcahy (FG)	Fidelma Healy Eames (FG)
25th	2016	Paul Gavan (SF)	Máire Devine (Note: Suspended from Sinn Féin 19 March – 19 June 2018.) (SF)	Ged Nash (Note: Elected to Dáil Éireann on 8 February 2020.) (Lab)	Gerard Craughwell (Ind.)	Terry Leyden (FF)	Ned O'Sullivan (FF)	Robbie Gallagher (FF)	Jennifer Murnane O'Connor (FF)	Jerry Buttimer (FG)	Joe O'Reilly (FG)	Neale Richmond (FG)
26th	2020	Paul Gavan (SF)	Pauline O'Reilly (GP)	Marie Sherlock (Lab)	Gerard Craughwell (Ind.)	Pat Casey (FF)	Ned O'Sullivan (FF)	Robbie Gallagher (FF)	Shane Cassells (FF)	Jerry Buttimer (FG)	Joe O'Reilly (FG)	John Cummins (FG)
27th	2025	Maria McCormack (SF)	Chris Andrews (SF)	Nessa Cosgrove (Lab)	Gerard Craughwell (Ind.)	Pat Casey (FF)	Patricia Stephenson (SD)	Robbie Gallagher (FF)	Margaret Murphy O'Mahony (FF)	Mark Duffy (FG)	Joe O'Reilly (FG)	Mike Kennelly (FG)

Note: The columns in this table are used only for presentational purposes, and no significance should be attached to the order of columns.

== List of nominating bodies ==
The following bodies are on the register of nominating bodies maintained by the Seanad Returning Officer for the Labour Panel:

- Irish Conference of Professional and Service Associations
- Irish Congress of Trade Unions
