= James Johnston (Seanad Éireann member) =

Irish politician

Senator
- In office 27 April 1938 – 21 April 1948
- Constituency: Labour Panel

Personal details
- Political party: Independent

James Johnston was an Irish politician. He was an independent member of Seanad Éireann from 1938 to 1948. He was first elected to the 2nd Seanad in April 1938 by the Labour Panel. He was-elected at the August 1938, 1943 and 1944 elections. He lost his seat at the 1948 Seanad election.
