= Patrick Fitzsimons (politician) =

Irish politician (died 1982)

Senator
- In office 22 May 1957 – 1 June 1973
- In office 21 April 1948 – 22 July 1954
- Constituency: Administrative Panel

Personal details
- Died: 13 June 1982
- Party: Independent
- Spouse: Margaret Russell

Patrick Fitzsimons (died 13 June 1982) was an Irish politician. He was an independent member of Seanad Éireann from 1948 to 1954 and from 1957 to 1973. He was first elected to the Seanad in 1948 by the Administrative Panel. He lost his seat at the 1954 election but was re-elected at the 1957 election. He did not contest the 1973 Seanad election. He was also a member of Meath County Council.
