= Michael Lanigan =

Michael Lanigan may refer to:

- Mick Lanigan, Irish politician
- Mike Lanigan, American race team owner
