= Nicole Ryan =

Irish politician

Senator Nicole Ryan
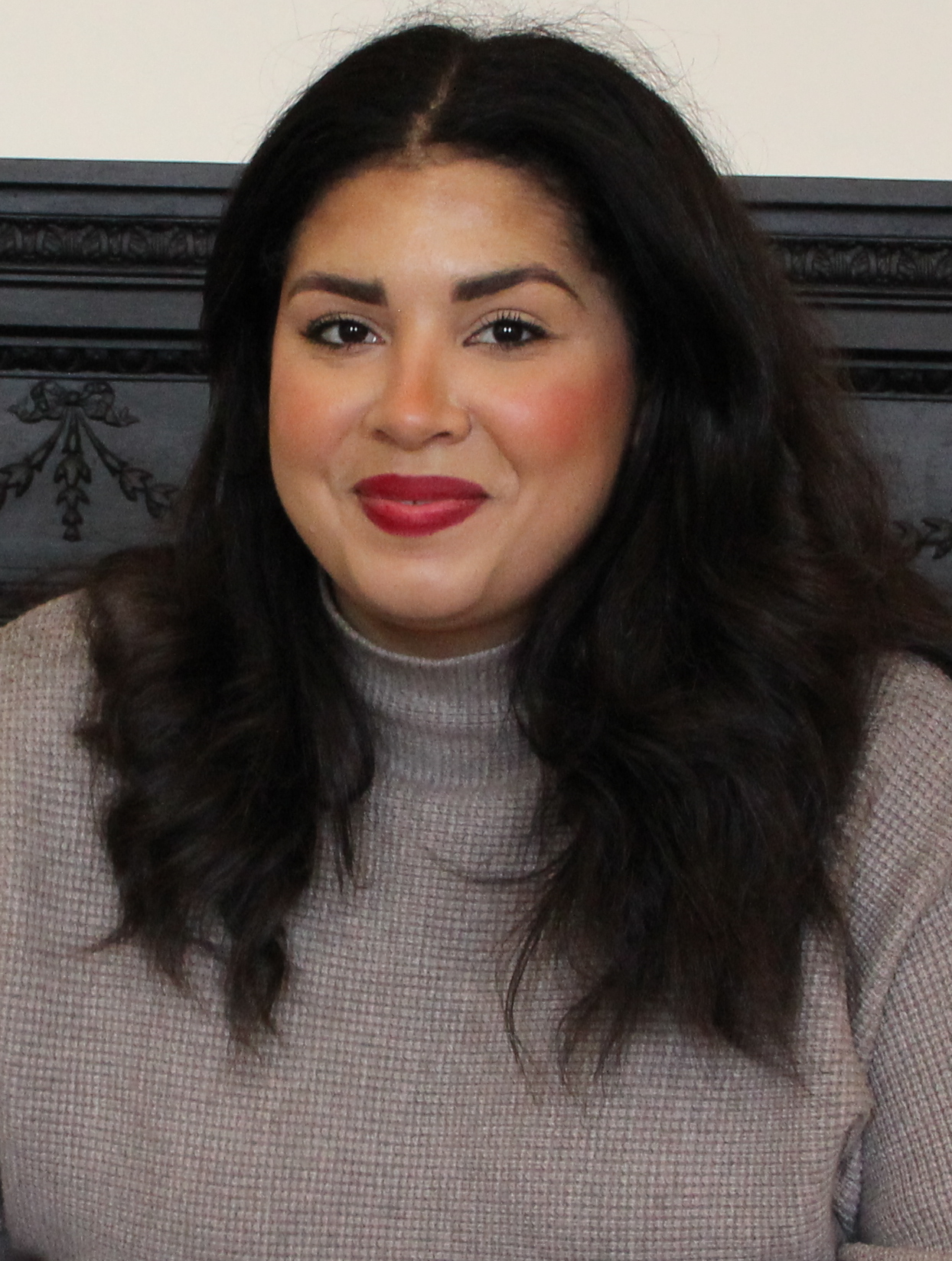
- Ryan in 2025

Senator
- Incumbent
- Assumed office January 2025
- Constituency: Administrative Panel

Personal details
- Born: 1993/1994 (age 32–33) Kyiv, Ukraine
- Party: Sinn Féin
- Education: University College Cork

Nicole Ryan (born 1993/1994) is an Irish Sinn Féin politician who has been a senator for the Administrative Panel since January 2025.

== Personal life ==
Ryan was born in Kyiv, Ukraine to a Portuguese father and a Ukrainian mother and grew up in Millstreet, County Cork. Her grandfather, Viktor Kalinichko, was a lieutenant-colonel in the KGB. Ryan lost her brother Alex Ryan to a party drug in 2016. She subsequently returned to education at University College Cork to study addiction. Ryan lives in the Gaeltacht village of Ballyvourney in County Cork.

== Anti-drug activism ==
Ryan has spent many years as an anti-drug campaigner, visiting schools all over Ireland and speaking to over 13,000 post-primary students about the dangers of drugs. She received a "Pride of Cork" award for her efforts in 2021.

== Political career ==
Ryan was elected to Seanad Éireann at the 2025 Seanad election for the Administrative Panel. She was an unsuccessful candidate at the 2024 general election for the Cork North-West constituency.
