= Richard Anthony (politician) =

Irish politician (1875–1962)

Senator
- In office 22 July 1954 – 22 May 1957
- In office 21 April 1948 – 14 August 1951
- Constituency: Labour Panel

Teachta Dála
- In office June 1943 – February 1948
- In office June 1927 – June 1938
- Constituency: Cork Borough

Lord Mayor of Cork
- In office 1942–1943

Personal details
- Born: 20 October 1875 Clonmel, County Tipperary, Ireland
- Died: 3 January 1962 (aged 86) Cork, Ireland
- Party: Labour Party; Independent
- Spouse: 3
- Children: 7

Richard Sydney Anthony (20 October 1875 – 3 January 1962) was an Irish politician and trade unionist.

== Biography ==
In his teens he joined the printing staff of The Cork Examiner, where in time he became a linotype operator. A member of the Cork Typographical Association (president from the 1920s), he became a leading figure in the Cork Workers' Council. In the 1920s he was a member of the national executive of the Labour Party and in 1924 a member of the executive council of the Irish Trades Union Congress.

Anthony stood unsuccessfully for election at the 1923 general election. He was first elected to Dáil Éireann as a Labour Party TD for the Cork Borough constituency at the June 1927 general election. He was re-elected as a Labour Party TD at the September 1927 general election.

In 1931, Anthony defied the Labour whip and supported the Constitution (Amendment No. 17) Bill, a measure proposed by the government of W. T. Cosgrave against the Irish Republican Army. The Executive Council sought to establish military courts that were empowered to impose sentences – including capital punishment, without appeal – in response to IRA violence. Alongside Daniel Morrissey, Anthony broke ranks with Labour, who thought the measures too authoritarian, and voted for the bill, and both of them were expelled from the party.

Anthony was elected as an independent TD at the 1932 general election. He was re-elected as an independent TD at the 1933 and 1937 general elections.

Anthony was well known for his anti-communist views. In August 1939 he told the forty-fifth Irish Trades Union Congress that he would prefer fascism to a "dictatorship of the proletariat". Earlier that same year, back in April, Anthony had proposed a motion at Cork City Corporation congratulating Franco on "concluding his war against communism and anarchy in Spain".

He lost his seat at the 1938 general election but was re-elected at the 1943 and 1944 general elections as an independent. He re-joined the Labour Party in 1948. He again lost his Dáil seat at the 1948 general election but was elected to the 6th Seanad on the Labour Panel at the subsequent Seanad election in 1948. He stood at the 1951 general election but was not elected. He did not contest the 1951 Seanad election but was elected to the 8th Seanad in 1954, again on the Labour Panel. He did not contest the 1957 Seanad election and retired from politics.

He served as Lord Mayor of Cork from 1942 to 1943. He married three times; he and his first wife (née Powell from Cork) had seven children.

Civic offices
Preceded by James Allen	Lord Mayor of Cork; 1942–1943	Succeeded by James Hickey

Dáil	Election	Deputy (Party)	Deputy (Party)	Deputy (Party)	Deputy (Party)	Deputy (Party)
2nd	1921	Liam de Róiste (SF)	Mary MacSwiney (SF)	Donal O'Callaghan (SF)	J. J. Walsh (SF)	4 seats 1921–1923
3rd	1922	Liam de Róiste (PT-SF)	Mary MacSwiney (AT-SF)	Robert Day (Lab)	J. J. Walsh (PT-SF)	4 seats 1921–1923
4th	1923	Richard Beamish (Ind.)	Mary MacSwiney (Rep)	Andrew O'Shaughnessy (Ind.)	J. J. Walsh (CnaG)	Alfred O'Rahilly (CnaG)
4th	1924 by-election	Richard Beamish (Ind.)	Mary MacSwiney (Rep)	Andrew O'Shaughnessy (Ind.)	J. J. Walsh (CnaG)	Michael Egan (CnaG)
5th	1927 (Jun)	John Horgan (NL)	Seán French (FF)	Richard Anthony (Lab)	J. J. Walsh (CnaG)	Barry Egan (CnaG)
6th	1927 (Sep)	W. T. Cosgrave (CnaG)	Seán French (FF)	Richard Anthony (Lab)	Hugo Flinn (FF)	Barry Egan (CnaG)
7th	1932	W. T. Cosgrave (CnaG)	Thomas Dowdall (FF)	Richard Anthony (Ind.)	Hugo Flinn (FF)	William Desmond (CnaG)
8th	1933	W. T. Cosgrave (CnaG)	Thomas Dowdall (FF)	Richard Anthony (Ind.)	Hugo Flinn (FF)	William Desmond (CnaG)
9th	1937	W. T. Cosgrave (FG)	Thomas Dowdall (FF)	Richard Anthony (Ind.)	Hugo Flinn (FF)	4 seats 1937–1948
10th	1938	W. T. Cosgrave (FG)	Thomas Dowdall (FF)	James Hickey (Lab)	Hugo Flinn (FF)	4 seats 1937–1948
11th	1943	W. T. Cosgrave (FG)	Frank Daly (FF)	Richard Anthony (Ind.)	Séamus Fitzgerald (FF)	4 seats 1937–1948
12th	1944	William Dwyer (Ind.)	Frank Daly (FF)	Richard Anthony (Ind.)	Walter Furlong (FF)	4 seats 1937–1948
12th	1946 by-election	Patrick McGrath (FF)	Frank Daly (FF)	Richard Anthony (Ind.)	Walter Furlong (FF)	4 seats 1937–1948
13th	1948	Patrick McGrath (FF)	Michael Sheehan (Ind.)	James Hickey (NLP)	Jack Lynch (FF)	Thomas F. O'Higgins (FG)
14th	1951	Patrick McGrath (FF)	Seán McCarthy (FF)	James Hickey (Lab)	Jack Lynch (FF)	Thomas F. O'Higgins (FG)
14th	1954 by-election	Patrick McGrath (FF)	Seán McCarthy (FF)	James Hickey (Lab)	Jack Lynch (FF)	Stephen Barrett (FG)
15th	1954	Patrick McGrath (FF)	Anthony Barry (FG)	Seán Casey (Lab)	Jack Lynch (FF)	Stephen Barrett (FG)
15th	1956 by-election	John Galvin (FF)	Anthony Barry (FG)	Seán Casey (Lab)	Jack Lynch (FF)	Stephen Barrett (FG)
16th	1957	John Galvin (FF)	Gus Healy (FF)	Seán Casey (Lab)	Jack Lynch (FF)	Stephen Barrett (FG)
17th	1961	John Galvin (FF)	Anthony Barry (FG)	Seán Casey (Lab)	Jack Lynch (FF)	Stephen Barrett (FG)
17th	1964 by-election	Sheila Galvin (FF)	Anthony Barry (FG)	Seán Casey (Lab)	Jack Lynch (FF)	Stephen Barrett (FG)
18th	1965	Gus Healy (FF)	Pearse Wyse (FF)	Seán Casey (Lab)	Jack Lynch (FF)	Stephen Barrett (FG)
18th	1967 by-election	Gus Healy (FF)	Pearse Wyse (FF)	Seán French (FF)	Jack Lynch (FF)	Stephen Barrett (FG)
19th	1969	Constituency abolished. See Cork City North-West and Cork City South-East				
