= Michael Conway (senator) =

Irish politician

Senator
- In office 27 April 1938 – 7 September 1938
- Constituency: Labour Panel

Personal details
- Political party: Independent

Michael Conway was an Irish politician. He was an independent member of Seanad Éireann from April to September 1938. He was elected to the 2nd Seanad in April 1938 by the Labour Panel. He did not contest the August 1938 Seanad election.
