= Michael Quealy =

Irish politician (died 2002)

Senator
- In office 23 February 1983 – 25 April 1987
- Constituency: Agricultural Panel

Personal details
- Died: September 2002 County Waterford, Ireland
- Party: Fine Gael
- Spouse: Carmel Quealy
- Children: 6

Michael A. Quealy (died September 2002) was a Fine Gael politician in Ireland. He was a senator from 1983 to 1987, elected to the 17th Seanad on the Agricultural Panel, but was not re-elected in the 1987 elections. He was a member of Waterford County Council from 1974 to 1999.
