= Michael Twomey (politician) =

Irish politician

Senator
- In office 27 April 1938 – 7 September 1938
- Constituency: Agricultural Panel

Personal details
- Born: County Cork, Ireland
- Political party: Independent; Clann na Talmhan

Michael Twomey was an Irish politician. He was an independent member of Seanad Éireann from April to September 1938. He was elected to the 2nd Seanad in April 1938 to the Agricultural Panel. He lost his seat at the August 1938 Seanad election.

He stood unsuccessfully for Dáil Éireann as an Clann na Talmhan candidate for the Cork West constituency at the 1943 general election.
