= Thomas Kilbride (politician) =

Irish politician (1911–1986)

Senator
- In office 1 June 1973 – 8 October 1981
- Constituency: Administrative Panel

Personal details
- Born: 28 April 1911
- Died: 30 August 1986 (aged 75)
- Party: Fine Gael

Thomas Kilbride (28 April 1911 – 30 August 1986) was an Irish Fine Gael politician, who was a member of Seanad Éireann from 1973 to 1981. He was elected to the Seanad by the Administrative Panel in 1973 and re-elected in 1977.
