= Seán Brosnahan =

Irish politician and trade unionist (1911–1987)

Senator
- In office 14 December 1961 – 27 October 1977
- Constituency: Labour Panel

Personal details
- Born: 26 August 1911 County Clare, Ireland
- Died: 9 December 1987 (aged 76) Dublin, Ireland
- Party: Independent
- Spouse: Sheila Quinn (m. 1950)
- Children: 4
- Education: De La Salle Teachers Training College; University College Dublin

Seán Brosnahan (26 August 1911 – 9 December 1987) was an Irish independent politician.

He was educated at St Mary's CBS, St Brendan's College, De La Salle Teachers Training College, and University College Dublin.

He was a trade union official and general secretary of the Irish National Teachers' Organisation (INTO) from 1967 to 1978. From 1947 to 1948, Brosnahan served as president of the INTO.

He was elected to Seanad Éireann by the Labour Panel at the 1961 Seanad election, and re-elected in 1965, 1969 and 1973. He lost his seat at the 1977 Seanad election.
