= Basil Chubb =

Professor Basil Chubb

Frederick Basil Chubb (8 December 1921 – 8 May 2002) was an English and Irish political scientist, author and broadcaster.

Chubb was the first chair of the new Department of Political Science at Trinity College, Dublin, and was responsible for numerous publications which became standard works for those wishing to gain insight into Irish government and politics, most notably his The Government and Politics of Ireland, which was published in four editions. He was described as the "Father of political science in Ireland" and the "virtual inventor of Irish political science".

== Early life, military service and education ==
Basil Chubb was born in Branksome, Poole, Dorset, the second eldest of five children. The family moved to Ludgershall, Wiltshire when he was still a child and he attended Bishop Wordsworth's School. He attended Merton College, Oxford, but his education was interrupted by the onset of World War II. He joined the RAF, but was shot down and captured during a bombing raid over Leipzig on 19 February 1944. He spent 15 months as a prisoner at Stalag Luft III, a German air force prisoner of war camp which is best known for two escapes which took place there. Basil was not one of the escapers, although he had to witness the repercussions of the various escape efforts once discovered.

Before joining the RAF, Basil had met Margaret (Margot) Rafther at Oxford, and she sent him letters and books via the Red Cross to enable him to continue his studies while imprisoned. They married in 1946, following the end of the war. Also in that year, he completed his first degree in Modern History at Oxford, followed by a master's degree from Trinity College, Dublin, a doctorate from Oxford, and a Doctor of Letters from Trinity College, Dublin. Chubb and Rafther were friends with George Orwell.

Chubb became an Irish citizen in the early 1970s.

== Career ==
His first academic appointment was as lecturer in political science at Trinity College, Dublin. This was the first full-time appointment in political science at the college, at a time when Irish politics were not discussed as an academic subject. When TCD's department of Political Science was founded, in 1960, Basil Chubb became its first chair, a post which he held until his retirement in 1991.

During his career he produced a number of books, including The Government and Politics of Ireland, which the Irish Times described as "the secular equivalent of an Irish political bible". He also held a number of public office posts, including chair of the Employer-Labour Conference (which played a crucial role in national economic policy) and chair of Comhairle na n-Ospideal (the Hospitals Council) from 1972 to 1979. He was a frequent broadcaster in the coverage of Irish political campaigns and helped demystify the topic for the general public through his television appearances during the Irish elections.

His wife Margot died in 1984. He subsequently married Orla Sheehan, with whom he had a daughter, Katie. He died on 8 May 2002, aged 80.

== Books ==
He was the author of the following publications:

- The control of public expenditure: Financial committees of the House of Commons (1952)
- A Source Book of Irish Government (1964)
- The Government and Politics of Ireland (1970)
- The Constitution and Constitutional Change in Ireland (1978)
- The Politics of the Irish Constitution (1991)
- FIE 50: Federation of Irish Employers, 1942-92 (1992)

He also contributed to the following:

- Economic Development and Planning Readings in Irish Public Administration: Volume 1 (1969), as editor
- Parish Pump: Study of Democratic Efficiency and Local Government in Ireland (with Myles Tierney)

== Legacy ==
The Political Studies Association of Ireland established an annual award to recognise the best PhD thesis in honour of Chubb's memory. Awarded to recognise outstanding contributions to the research of politics undertaken in Ireland, there have been 20 winners of the Basil Chubb Prize between 2006 and 2025.

List of Basil Chubb Prize winners 2006-2026

2025	Dale Pankhurst	Queen's University Belfast
2024	Dave Banks	University College Dublin
2023	Gail Ritchie	Queen's University Belfast
2022	Matt York	University College Cork
2021	Mary Brennan	University College Dublin
2020	Alan Duggan	Trinity College Dublin
2019	Silja Bára Ómarsdóttir	University College Cork
2018	Sean Brennan	Queen's University Belfast
2017	Cathal FitzGerald	Dublin City University
2016	Jessica Doyle	University College Dublin
2015	Jennifer Carroll MacNeill	University College Dublin
2014	Erin Baumann	University College Dublin
2013	Walt Kilroy	Dublin City University
2012	Iosif Kovras	Queen's University Belfast
2011	Michael Breen	University College Dublin
2010	Catherine O'Rourke	Ulster University
2009	Oliver Feeney	University of Galway
2008	Brighid Brooks-Kelly	Trinity College Dublin
2007	Joanne McEvoy	Queen's University Belfast
2006	Eoin O'Malley	Trinity College Dublin

Accordingly, the institutions represented (and number of awards each) consist of University College Dublin (6), Queen's University Belfast (5), Trinity College Dublin (3), Dublin City University (2), University College Cork (2), Ulster University (1) and University of Galway (1).

A Festschrift was assembled to mark the occasion of his retirement. Modern Irish Democracy: Essays in Honour of Basil Chubb by Ronald J Hill and Michael Marsh, was published in 1993.

== Relations ==
Basil's uncle, Sir Cecil Chubb, owned Stonehenge and gave it to the British nation.

== See also ==
- Stalag Luft III
- Robin Neillands, ed. 2004 The Bomber War ISBN 978-0-7195-6241-9
- Trinity College website
- Basil Chubb, ed. 1982 The Government and Politics of Ireland ISBN 978-0-8047-1115-9
- Tony Rennell and John Nichol The Last Escape - The Untold Story Of Allied POWs 1944-45 ISBN 978-0-670-03212-9
