= 2014 Seanad by-election =

By-election to the 24th Seanad

A by-election was held for a vacancy in the Cultural and Educational Panel of Seanad Éireann on 10 October 2014. The vacancy was caused by the election of Fine Gael's Deirdre Clune to the European Parliament. It was won by independent candidate Gerard Craughwell.

== Election system ==
In vacancies in the vocational panels, the electorate in by-elections consists of Oireachtas members only. To be nominated, a candidate required the signature of nine TDs or Senators. The electorate to fill the casual vacancy was the 225 members of the Oireachtas.

All votes were cast by postal ballot, and were counted using the single transferable vote. Under this system, voters can rank candidates in order of their preference, 1 as their first preference, 2 for second preference, and so on.

== Election ==
Fine Gael Senator Deirdre Clune was elected to the European Parliament for the South constituency at the 2014 European Parliament election on 23 May. This created a vacancy in the Cultural and Educational Panel.

Gerard Craughwell put himself forward in August 2014 as an independent candidate, initially a symbolic gesture to protest against the usual practice of the government using its parliamentary majority to secure the election of its chosen candidate. Craughwell secured nomination from members of the technical group and Fianna Fáil.

On 12 September 2014, the Minister for Arts, Heritage and the Gaeltacht Heather Humphreys wrote to John McNulty, a businessman who had run unsuccessfully for Donegal County Council in the 2014 local elections, offering him a place on the board of the Irish Museum of Modern Art (IMMA); he accepted on 15 September, and before nominations closed on 18 September Fine Gael nominated him for the by-election to fill the Seanad vacancy. Opposition politicians protested that McNulty's IMMA appointment was abusive and had been made solely to bolster his eligibility for the Cultural and Educational Panel; Humphreys took responsibility for the appointment and refused to state whether others had pressed her to make it. McNulty resigned from the IMMA board on 25 September, stating its rules prohibited board members from running for election.

On 30 September, McNulty withdrew his name from consideration in the by-election, stating that "to contest the election would be an ongoing distraction from the critical work of Government"; however, as the period to formally withdraw had elapsed, his name remained on the ballot paper and he requested that electors not vote for him. Many electors voted for McNulty regardless, with Craughwell winning the election held on 10 October.

== Result ==
2014 Seanad by-election: Cultural and Educational Panel
Party	Candidate	FPv%	Count	
Party	Candidate	FPv%	1	2
Independent	Gerard Craughwell	45.1	87	98
Fine Gael	John McNulty	43.5	84	85
Sinn Féin	Catherine Seeley	11.4	22	
Electorate: 223 Valid: 193 Quota: 96.501 Turnout: 86.5%

On 23 February 2016, in a televised debate before the 2016 general election, Enda Kenny appeared to concede for the first time that it was his decision to nominate McNulty to IMMA, later backtracking somewhat.
