= David Cullinane =

Irish politician (born 1974)

David Cullinane TD
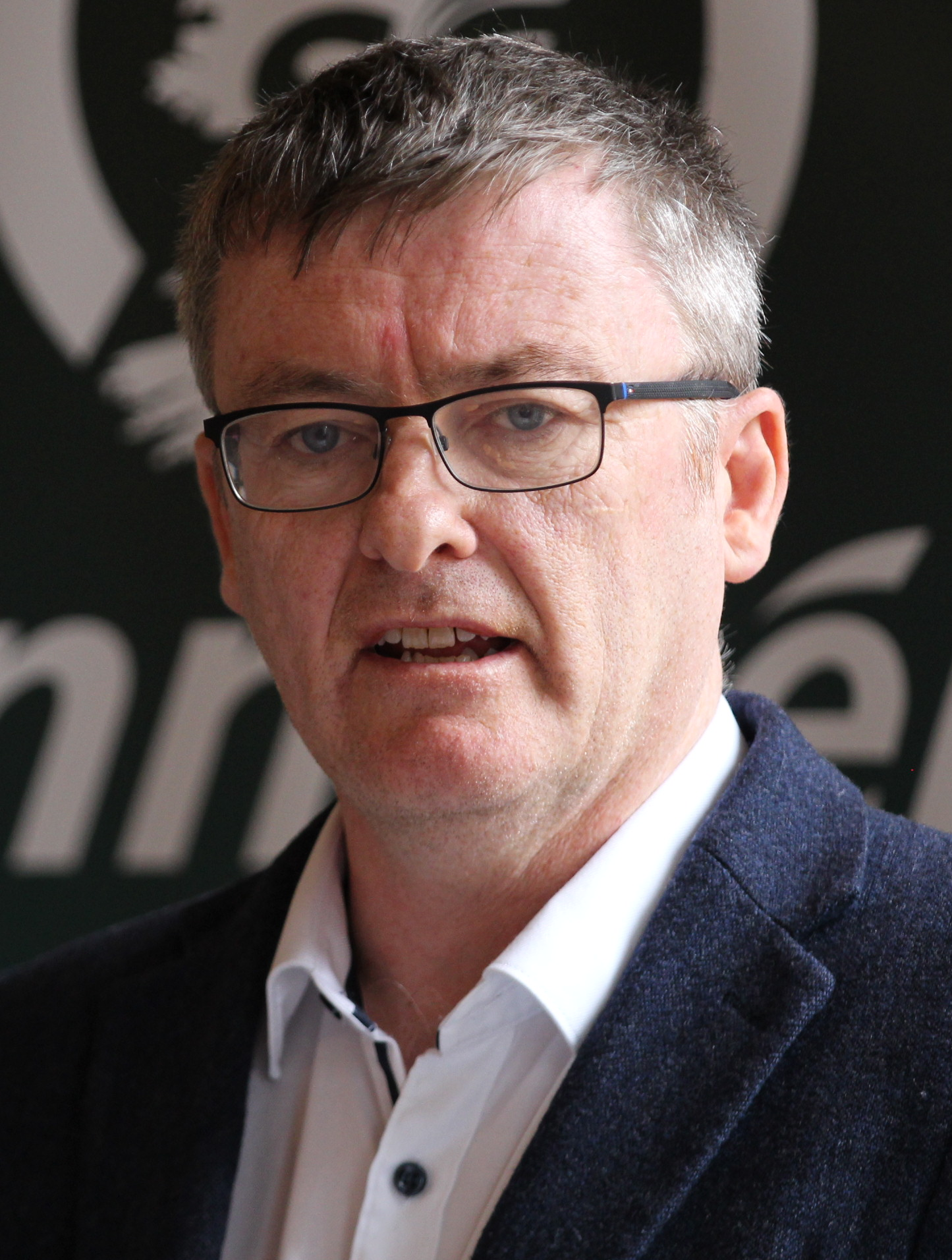
- Cullinane in 2024

Teachta Dála
- Incumbent
- Assumed office February 2016
- Constituency: Waterford

Senator
- In office 25 May 2011 – 26 February 2016
- Constituency: Labour Panel

Personal details
- Born: 4 July 1974 (age 52) Waterford, Ireland
- Party: Sinn Féin
- Spouse: Kathleen Funchion (m. 2007; div. 2013)
- Children: 2
- Education: Waterford Institute of Technology

David Cullinane (born 4 July 1974) is an Irish Sinn Féin politician who has been a Teachta Dála (TD) for the Waterford constituency since the 2016 general election. He previously served as a Senator for the Labour Panel from 2011 to 2016.

== Personal life ==
Cullinane was born in Waterford in 1974. He was married to Kathleen Funchion, who is a Sinn Féin MEP for South.

== Political career ==
He was elected to Waterford City Council at the 2004 local elections and retained his seat at the 2009 local elections.

He became a member of Seanad Éireann in May 2011, as a senator for the Labour Panel. The Irish Times described him in the Seanad as "a frequent, informed and often abrasive contributor across a wide range of areas, with a keen attention to the nuances of legislation".

He unsuccessfully contested the Waterford constituency at the 2002, 2007 and 2011 general elections, before winning a seat in 2016. He was re-elected in 2020, when his 20,596 first preference votes amounted to 1.95 quotas, and was the highest ever recorded in the constituency's history.

Cullinane drew criticism on election night when a 30-second video uploaded to Twitter showed him ending his election victory speech with the phrases "up the Republic, Up the 'Ra and Tiocfaidh ár lá". When questioned about the appropriateness of using these phrases associated with support for the IRA, Cullinane stated: "Yesterday was a very emotional day for me ... It was a long count and obviously we were very excited and very proud of the vote we got yesterday in Waterford. The 30-second clip was part of a longer speech that I gave where I was reflecting back on the hunger strikes, reflecting back on the fact that Kevin Lynch stood in the Waterford constituency in 1981. He was someone who inspired me and inspired I think many republicans. The comments were made in that context."

At the 2024 general election, Cullinane was re-elected to the Dáil.

In April 2025 Cullinane, Sinn Féin's health spokesperson, was criticised for describing the British Supreme Court ruling in For Women Scotland Ltd v The Scottish Ministers (which defined “woman” and “sex” to exclude transgender women from legal recognition) as a “common sense judgement” worth considering in Ireland. After Cullinane deleted the post and issued an apology, Trans and Intersex Pride Dublin threatened to ban Sinn Féin from its July march unless the party clarified its stance and reversed support for a puberty blocker ban in Northern Ireland. The group accused Sinn Féin of enabling anti-trans policies in Northern Ireland while “pinkwashing” its image in the Republic.

Dáil	Election	Deputy (Party)	Deputy (Party)	Deputy (Party)	Deputy (Party)
4th	1923	Caitlín Brugha (Rep)	John Butler (Lab)	Nicholas Wall (FP)	William Redmond (NL)
5th	1927 (Jun)	Caitlín Brugha (Rep)	Patrick Little (FF)	Vincent White (CnaG)	William Redmond (NL)
6th	1927 (Sep)	Seán Goulding (FF)	Patrick Little (FF)	Vincent White (CnaG)	William Redmond (NL)
7th	1932	Seán Goulding (FF)	Patrick Little (FF)	John Kiersey (CnaG)	William Redmond (CnaG)
8th	1933	Seán Goulding (FF)	Patrick Little (FF)	Nicholas Wall (NCP)	Bridget Redmond (CnaG)
9th	1937	Michael Morrissey (FF)	Patrick Little (FF)	Nicholas Wall (FG)	Bridget Redmond (FG)
10th	1938	Michael Morrissey (FF)	Patrick Little (FF)	William Broderick (FG)	Bridget Redmond (FG)
11th	1943	Michael Morrissey (FF)	Patrick Little (FF)	Denis Heskin (CnaT)	Bridget Redmond (FG)
12th	1944	Michael Morrissey (FF)	Patrick Little (FF)	Denis Heskin (CnaT)	Bridget Redmond (FG)
12th	1947 by-election	John Ormonde (FF)	Patrick Little (FF)	Denis Heskin (CnaT)	Bridget Redmond (FG)
13th	1948	John Ormonde (FF)	Patrick Little (FF)	Thomas Kyne (Lab)	Bridget Redmond (FG)
14th	1951	John Ormonde (FF)	Patrick Little (FF)	Thomas Kyne (Lab)	Bridget Redmond (FG)
14th	1952 by-election	John Ormonde (FF)	Patrick Little (FF)	Thomas Kyne (Lab)	William Kenneally (FF)
15th	1954	John Ormonde (FF)	Thaddeus Lynch (FG)	Thomas Kyne (Lab)	William Kenneally (FF)
16th	1957	John Ormonde (FF)	Thaddeus Lynch (FG)	Thomas Kyne (Lab)	William Kenneally (FF)
17th	1961	John Ormonde (FF)	Thaddeus Lynch (FG)	Thomas Kyne (Lab)	3 seats 1961–1977
18th	1965	Billy Kenneally (FF)	Thaddeus Lynch (FG)	Thomas Kyne (Lab)	3 seats 1961–1977
18th	1966 by-election	Billy Kenneally (FF)	Fad Browne (FF)	Thomas Kyne (Lab)	3 seats 1961–1977
19th	1969	Billy Kenneally (FF)	Fad Browne (FF)	Edward Collins (FG)	3 seats 1961–1977
20th	1973	Billy Kenneally (FF)	Thomas Kyne (Lab)	Edward Collins (FG)	3 seats 1961–1977
21st	1977	Billy Kenneally (FF)	Jackie Fahey (FF)	Edward Collins (FG)	Austin Deasy (FG)
22nd	1981	Billy Kenneally (FF)	Jackie Fahey (FF)	Edward Collins (FG)	Austin Deasy (FG)
23rd	1982 (Feb)	Paddy Gallagher (SF–WP)	Jackie Fahey (FF)	Edward Collins (FG)	Austin Deasy (FG)
24th	1982 (Nov)	Donal Ormonde (FF)	Jackie Fahey (FF)	Edward Collins (FG)	Austin Deasy (FG)
25th	1987	Martin Cullen (PDs)	Jackie Fahey (FF)	Brian Swift (FF)	Austin Deasy (FG)
26th	1989	Brian O'Shea (Lab)	Jackie Fahey (FF)	Brendan Kenneally (FF)	Austin Deasy (FG)
27th	1992	Brian O'Shea (Lab)	Martin Cullen (PDs)	Brendan Kenneally (FF)	Austin Deasy (FG)
28th	1997	Brian O'Shea (Lab)	Martin Cullen (FF)	Brendan Kenneally (FF)	Austin Deasy (FG)
29th	2002	Brian O'Shea (Lab)	Martin Cullen (FF)	Ollie Wilkinson (FF)	John Deasy (FG)
30th	2007	Brian O'Shea (Lab)	Martin Cullen (FF)	Brendan Kenneally (FF)	John Deasy (FG)
31st	2011	Ciara Conway (Lab)	John Halligan (Ind.)	Paudie Coffey (FG)	John Deasy (FG)
32nd	2016	David Cullinane (SF)	John Halligan (Ind.)	Mary Butler (FF)	John Deasy (FG)
33rd	2020	David Cullinane (SF)	Marc Ó Cathasaigh (GP)	Mary Butler (FF)	Matt Shanahan (Ind.)
34th	2024	David Cullinane (SF)	Conor D. McGuinness (SF)	Mary Butler (FF)	John Cummins (FG)
