= Diarmuid Wilson =

Irish politician (born 1965)

Senator Diarmuid Wilson
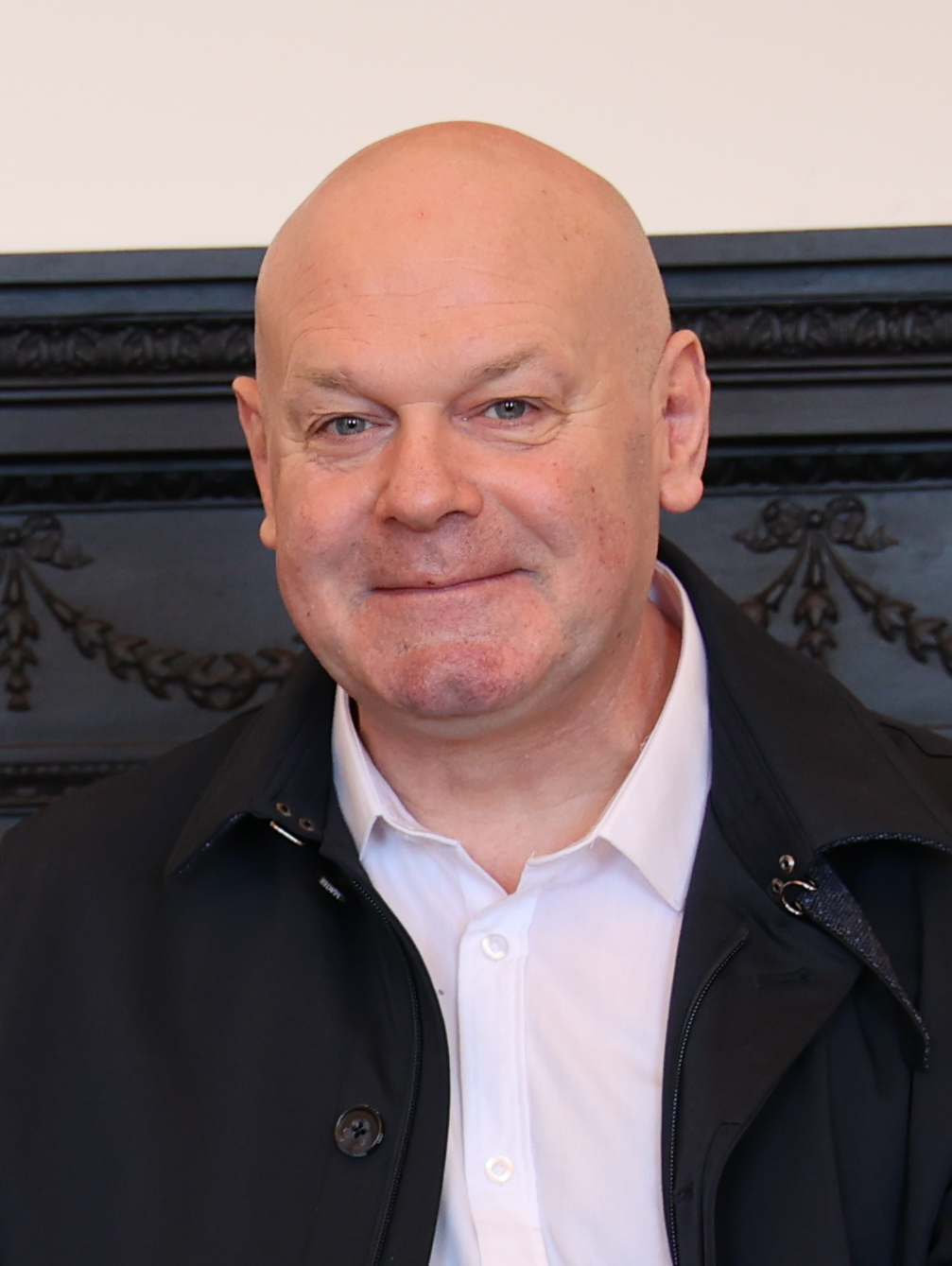
- Wilson in 2025

Senator
- Incumbent
- Assumed office 12 September 2002
- Constituency: Administrative Panel

Personal details
- Born: 20 November 1965 (age 60) Cavan, Ireland
- Party: Fianna Fáil
- Relatives: John Wilson (uncle)
- Education: St Patrick's College, Maynooth; Brunel University

Diarmuid Wilson (born 20 November 1965) is an Irish Fianna Fáil politician who has served as a senator for the Administrative Panel since September 2002.

A member of Cavan County Council from 1999 to 2004, he was first elected to the Seanad in 2002 and was re-elected in 2007 and 2011. He is the nephew of John Wilson, who was a TD, Minister and Tánaiste. He is the Fianna Fáil whip in the Seanad and spokesperson on Defence. Wilson is a member of the cross-party Oireachtas Friends of Israel in the Oireachtas.

== See also ==
- Families in the Oireachtas
