= Peter Kelleher (politician) =

Irish politician (born 1946)

Senator
- In office 23 February 1983 – 1 November 1989
- Constituency: Labour Panel

Personal details
- Born: 25 June 1946 (age 78)
- Political party: Fine Gael

Peter Kelleher (born 25 June 1946) is a former Fine Gael member of Seanad Éireann. He was elected to the Seanad in 1983 by the Labour Panel, and re-elected in 1987. He lost his seat at the 1989 election.
