= Jimmy Dunne (politician) =

Irish politician and trade unionist (1921–1972)

Senator
- In office 5 November 1969 – 23 February 1972
- Constituency: Labour Panel

Personal details
- Born: 1921 Dublin, Ireland
- Died: 23 February 1972 (aged 50–51)
- Party: Labour Party
- Education: University College Dublin

James Dunne (1921 – 23 February 1972) was an Irish Labour Party politician and trade union official. He was a member of Seanad Éireann from 1969 to 1972.

He attended National College of Industrial Relations and University College Dublin where he was awarded a diploma in social and economic studies. He was elected to the 12th Seanad in 1969 by the Labour Panel. He died in office in 1972. No by-election was held to fill his seat.

He became General Secretary of Marine Port and General Workers' Union in 1957, and was president of the Irish Congress of Trade Unions in 1969.

Trade union offices
Preceded by John Conroy	President of the Irish Congress of Trade Unions; 1969	Succeeded by James Morrow
