= Thomas Ruane =

Irish politician (died 1969)

Senator
- In office 14 August 1951 – 23 June 1965
- In office 18 August 1944 – 21 April 1948
- In office 27 April 1938 – 8 September 1943
- Constituency: Administrative Panel

Senator
- In office 12 December 1934 – 29 May 1936

Personal details
- Died: 7 June 1969
- Political party: Fianna Fáil

Thomas Ruane (died 7 June 1969) was an Irish Fianna Fáil politician. He was a member of Seanad Éireann from 1934 to 1936, 1938 to 1943, 1944 to 1948 and 1951 to 1965. He was first elected to the Free State Seanad in 1934. He did not serve in the 4th or 6th Seanad. From 1938 onwards, he was elected by the Administrative Panel. He lost his seat at the 1965 Seanad election.
