= Peter Lynch (politician) =

Irish politician (died 1967)

Senator
- In office 21 April 1948 – 14 December 1961
- Constituency: Industrial and Commercial Panel
- In office 8 September 1943 – 18 August 1944
- Constituency: Agricultural Panel
- In office 18 August 1944 – 21 April 1948
- In office 7 September 1938 – 8 September 1943
- Constituency: Labour Panel

Personal details
- Died: 9 May 1967
- Political party: Independent

Peter Timothy Lynch (died 9 May 1967) was an Irish politician. He was an independent member of Seanad Éireann from 1938 to 1961. A farmer and auctioneer, he was first elected to the Seanad in 1938 by the Labour Panel. He was elected by the Agricultural Panel in 1943, and again by the Labour Panel in 1944. From 1948 onwards he was elected by the Industrial and Commercial Panel. He did not contest the 1961 Seanad election.
