= Jack Harte (politician) =

Irish politician and trade unionist (1920–2015)

Senator
- In office 1 June 1973 – 17 February 1993
- Constituency: Labour Panel

Personal details
- Born: 10 December 1920 Dublin, Ireland
- Died: 9 March 2015 (aged 94) Dublin, Ireland
- Party: Labour Party
- Spouse: Myra Harte
- Children: 4

Military service
- Branch/service: Royal Irish Fusiliers
- Battles/wars: World War II

John Harte (10 December 1920 – 9 March 2015) was an Irish Labour Party Senator who served for seven terms in the Seanad.

Harte born in Dublin in 1920. During World War II he served with the British Army in the second battalion of the Royal Irish Fusiliers in Malta and the Middle East. He published his memoirs of the Second World War, To the Limits of Endurance: One Irishman's War. After the war, he worked for Guinness and became a trade union official.

He was first elected to the 13th Seanad in the 1973 Seanad elections, on the Labour Panel. He was re-elected six times until his retirement at the 1992 elections.

In 2015, he died at the age of 94.
