= Gerard Craughwell =

Irish politician (born 1953)

Senator Gerard Craughwell
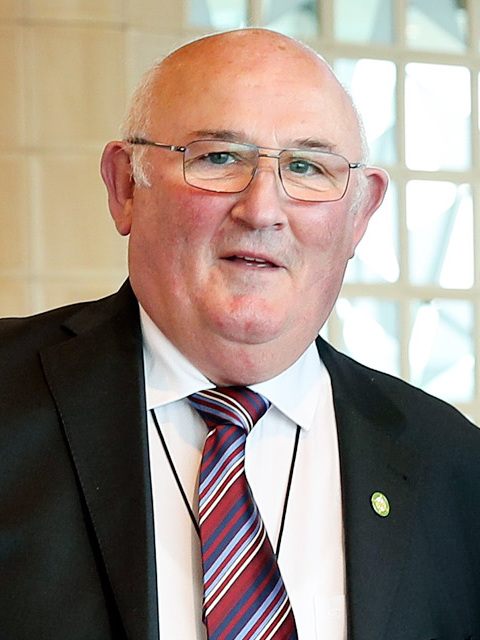
- Craughwell in 2020

Senator
- Incumbent
- Assumed office 8 June 2016
- Constituency: Labour Panel
- In office 10 October 2014 – 8 June 2016
- Constituency: Cultural and Educational Panel

Personal details
- Born: 22 November 1953 (age 72) Galway, Ireland
- Party: Independent
- Other political affiliations: Independent Alliance (2015–2016); Fine Gael (until 2012)
- Spouse: Helen Craughwell (m. 1978)
- Children: 2
- Education: Limerick Senior College
- Website: gerardcraughwell.ie

Military service
- Branch/service: British Army; Irish Army
- Rank: Sergeant
- Unit: Royal Irish Rangers; 1 Infantry Battalion

Gerard Patrick Craughwell (born 22 November 1953) is an Irish independent politician who has served as a senator for the Labour Panel since April 2016, and previously from 2014 to 2016 for the Cultural and Educational Panel.

== Early and personal life ==
Craughwell was born in Galway and grew up in Salthill. When he was 16, he emigrated to the United Kingdom, settling in London, working in a pub before joining the Royal Irish Rangers regiment of the British Army. After five years he returned to Ireland and joined the Irish Army, serving in the first infantry battalion and fifth medical company at Renmore Barracks in Galway and rising to the rank of sergeant. He left the army in 1980 and took over his father's gas appliance maintenance business until it failed in 1983. Aged 35, he entered further education as a student in Limerick Senior College, gaining a degree in economics accredited by the London School of Economics. In 1995 he started teaching in Dún Laoghaire Senior College and became an assistant principal. He joined the national executive of the Teachers' Union of Ireland in 2009, and was president between 2012 and June 2014.

He is married with two children. He was previously a member of Fine Gael, but ruled out re-joining the party.

== Political career ==
Craughwell contested the 2014 Seanad by-election which arose due to a vacancy on the Cultural and Educational Panel on the election of Deirdre Clune to the European Parliament, initially a symbolic gesture to protest against the usual practice of the government using its parliamentary majority to secure the election of its chosen candidate. Craughwell secured nomination from members of the technical group and Fianna Fáil. After controversy surrounding the appointment of John McNulty, the Fine Gael candidate, to a state board, Craughwell won the election on 10 October 2014.

Craughwell tried twice to join the Independent Seanad group, but it refused to admit him. He suggested the group, mainly Taoiseach's nominees, was compromising its independence and supporting the government. He later joined the Independent Alliance. He did not endorse Alliance members' criticism of the government's January 2016 appointment of David Begg, as Chair of the Pensions Authority.

Craughwell ran in the Seanad election in April 2016 and was elected this time for the Labour Panel.

Craughwell left the Independent Alliance during the government formation talks in 2016.

After raising the HPV vaccine in the Seanad, he distanced himself from anti-vaccine campaigners.

In 2016 Craughwell took a case on behalf of himself and a number of local authority members in Ireland to attempt to stop the deduction of Class K from their representation payments under the 2011 Oireachtas Act as it did not contribute towards any benefits for Social Protection and was considered unconstitutional as a result.

Craughwell indicated that he would seek a nomination for the 2018 presidential election, but later withdrew his intention, claiming that the main political parties were "working together to deny the citizens of this Republic the opportunity to select their next President by means of an election". To run for the presidency he would have needed the support of four local authorities or 20 Oireachtas members to be nominated. In 2018, he had emailed councillors with information on how to avoid under claiming expenses, and defended the advice commenting that being full-time councillor was a poorly paid profession.

In 2021 retired members of the Defence Forces including Craughwell and Leo Quinlan, son of Commandant Pat Quinlan, took the State to the Irish High Court over the long denial of medals to the relatives and the Irish troops who served under Quinlan's command in UN uniform during the siege of Jadotville in Katanga the breakaway province of the Congo. Despite successfully repelling a band of Katangan mercenaries without the loss of any Irishmen under Quinlan's command this event had been shamefully regarded by both the Department of Defence and the Department of Foreign Affairs as a military defeat while Quinlan only surrendered having run out of ammunition as demonstrated in various scholarly texts and in the acclaimed film Siege of Jadotville. The veterans subsequently received a full apology from the State for their long campaign for justice and an Independent Review Board was established to award the overdue medals which has still to actually award them.

In August 2023, Craughwell announced on Twitter that he thought the Gender Recognition Act 2015 was flawed, and that gender wasn't distinct from biological sex, and transgender individuals shouldn't be allowed into single-sex spaces that don't correspond to the sex they were assigned at birth. Prior to the act's passage in 2015, Craughwell had criticised proposals to only allow unmarried transgender individuals to change their gender markers on government documents and to require documentation of medical transition prior to allowing such a change.

Craughwell was re-elected at the 2020 and 2025 Seanad elections.
