= Andy O'Brien (politician) =

Irish politician (1915–2006)

Senator
- In office 23 February 1983 – 25 April 1987
- In office 27 October 1977 – 13 May 1982
- Constituency: Labour Panel
- In office 1 June 1973 – 27 October 1977
- Constituency: Administrative Panel
- In office 5 November 1969 – 1 June 1973
- Constituency: Agricultural Panel

Personal details
- Born: 21 January 1915 County Cavan, Ireland
- Died: 4 December 2006 (aged 91) County Cavan, Ireland
- Party: Fine Gael
- Spouse: Mollie O'Brien
- Children: 7
- Education: De La Salle College Waterford

Andy O'Brien (21 January 1915 – 4 December 2006) was a Fine Gael politician from County Cavan, Ireland. He was a senator from 1969 to 1982, and from 1983 to 1987.

O'Brien was a teacher who served as principal of the national school in Crubany for more than 40 years. He was member of Cavan County Council and Cavan Urban District Council for over 40 years, and a leading organiser of Fine Gael in the county.

He was elected to the 12th Seanad in 1969, on the Agricultural Panel, and re-elected in 1973 on the Administrative Panel. In 1977, he was elected to the 14th Seanad on the Labour Panel, which re-elected him in 1981. He did not contest the 1982 Seanad election, but in 1983 he was re-elected on the Labour Panel, and served until he stood down at the 1987 election.
