= John Ormonde =

Irish politician (1905–1981)

Minister for Posts and Telegraphs
- In office 4 December 1957 – 23 June 1959
- Taoiseach: Éamon de Valera
- Preceded by: Neil Blaney
- Succeeded by: Michael Hilliard

Senator
- In office 23 June 1965 – 5 November 1969
- Constituency: Labour Panel

Teachta Dála
- In office October 1947 – April 1965
- Constituency: Waterford

Personal details
- Born: 15 September 1905 County Waterford, Ireland
- Died: 25 June 1981 (aged 75) County Waterford, Ireland
- Party: Fianna Fáil
- Spouse: Hanna Mary Hickey (m. 1931)
- Children: 4, including Donal
- Education: De La Salle College Waterford

John Michael Ormonde (15 September 1905 – 25 June 1981) was an Irish Fianna Fáil politician.

== Early and personal life ==
He was born 15 September 1905 at Lismore, County Waterford, the son of John Ormonde, shopkeeper, and his wife, Ann Ormonde (née O'Brien). He was educated at the Lismore CBS. A member of Fianna Éireann, he delivered dispatches during the Irish Civil War, until his arrest before his seventeenth birthday in 1923. He was imprisoned in Lismore castle and Fermoy, but he escaped and remained on the run until the end of the civil war.

He attended De La Salle College Waterford and qualified as a teacher in 1928. He was appointed principal of Kilmacthomas national school, County Waterford, in 1932.

He married Hanna Mary Hickey, a nurse, in July 1931. They had one daughter and three sons. His son Donal was a Fianna Fáil TD for Waterford from 1982 to 1987.

== Politics ==
A founder member of Fianna Fáil in Waterford, he became a member of Waterford County Council. He was elected to Dáil Éireann at a by-election in October 1947 as a Fianna Fáil Teachta Dála (TD) for the Waterford constituency. In 1957 he joined the cabinet of Éamon de Valera as Minister for Posts and Telegraphs. He served in government until 1959. He lost his Dáil seat at the 1965 general election. He was elected to the Labour Panel at the 1965 election to the 11th Seanad.

== See also ==
- Families in the Oireachtas

Political offices
Preceded by Neil Blaney	Minister for Posts and Telegraphs; 1957–1959	Succeeded by Michael Hilliard

Dáil	Election	Deputy (Party)	Deputy (Party)	Deputy (Party)	Deputy (Party)
4th	1923	Caitlín Brugha (Rep)	John Butler (Lab)	Nicholas Wall (FP)	William Redmond (NL)
5th	1927 (Jun)	Caitlín Brugha (Rep)	Patrick Little (FF)	Vincent White (CnaG)	William Redmond (NL)
6th	1927 (Sep)	Seán Goulding (FF)	Patrick Little (FF)	Vincent White (CnaG)	William Redmond (NL)
7th	1932	Seán Goulding (FF)	Patrick Little (FF)	John Kiersey (CnaG)	William Redmond (CnaG)
8th	1933	Seán Goulding (FF)	Patrick Little (FF)	Nicholas Wall (NCP)	Bridget Redmond (CnaG)
9th	1937	Michael Morrissey (FF)	Patrick Little (FF)	Nicholas Wall (FG)	Bridget Redmond (FG)
10th	1938	Michael Morrissey (FF)	Patrick Little (FF)	William Broderick (FG)	Bridget Redmond (FG)
11th	1943	Michael Morrissey (FF)	Patrick Little (FF)	Denis Heskin (CnaT)	Bridget Redmond (FG)
12th	1944	Michael Morrissey (FF)	Patrick Little (FF)	Denis Heskin (CnaT)	Bridget Redmond (FG)
12th	1947 by-election	John Ormonde (FF)	Patrick Little (FF)	Denis Heskin (CnaT)	Bridget Redmond (FG)
13th	1948	John Ormonde (FF)	Patrick Little (FF)	Thomas Kyne (Lab)	Bridget Redmond (FG)
14th	1951	John Ormonde (FF)	Patrick Little (FF)	Thomas Kyne (Lab)	Bridget Redmond (FG)
14th	1952 by-election	John Ormonde (FF)	Patrick Little (FF)	Thomas Kyne (Lab)	William Kenneally (FF)
15th	1954	John Ormonde (FF)	Thaddeus Lynch (FG)	Thomas Kyne (Lab)	William Kenneally (FF)
16th	1957	John Ormonde (FF)	Thaddeus Lynch (FG)	Thomas Kyne (Lab)	William Kenneally (FF)
17th	1961	John Ormonde (FF)	Thaddeus Lynch (FG)	Thomas Kyne (Lab)	3 seats 1961–1977
18th	1965	Billy Kenneally (FF)	Thaddeus Lynch (FG)	Thomas Kyne (Lab)	3 seats 1961–1977
18th	1966 by-election	Billy Kenneally (FF)	Fad Browne (FF)	Thomas Kyne (Lab)	3 seats 1961–1977
19th	1969	Billy Kenneally (FF)	Fad Browne (FF)	Edward Collins (FG)	3 seats 1961–1977
20th	1973	Billy Kenneally (FF)	Thomas Kyne (Lab)	Edward Collins (FG)	3 seats 1961–1977
21st	1977	Billy Kenneally (FF)	Jackie Fahey (FF)	Edward Collins (FG)	Austin Deasy (FG)
22nd	1981	Billy Kenneally (FF)	Jackie Fahey (FF)	Edward Collins (FG)	Austin Deasy (FG)
23rd	1982 (Feb)	Paddy Gallagher (SF–WP)	Jackie Fahey (FF)	Edward Collins (FG)	Austin Deasy (FG)
24th	1982 (Nov)	Donal Ormonde (FF)	Jackie Fahey (FF)	Edward Collins (FG)	Austin Deasy (FG)
25th	1987	Martin Cullen (PDs)	Jackie Fahey (FF)	Brian Swift (FF)	Austin Deasy (FG)
26th	1989	Brian O'Shea (Lab)	Jackie Fahey (FF)	Brendan Kenneally (FF)	Austin Deasy (FG)
27th	1992	Brian O'Shea (Lab)	Martin Cullen (PDs)	Brendan Kenneally (FF)	Austin Deasy (FG)
28th	1997	Brian O'Shea (Lab)	Martin Cullen (FF)	Brendan Kenneally (FF)	Austin Deasy (FG)
29th	2002	Brian O'Shea (Lab)	Martin Cullen (FF)	Ollie Wilkinson (FF)	John Deasy (FG)
30th	2007	Brian O'Shea (Lab)	Martin Cullen (FF)	Brendan Kenneally (FF)	John Deasy (FG)
31st	2011	Ciara Conway (Lab)	John Halligan (Ind.)	Paudie Coffey (FG)	John Deasy (FG)
32nd	2016	David Cullinane (SF)	John Halligan (Ind.)	Mary Butler (FF)	John Deasy (FG)
33rd	2020	David Cullinane (SF)	Marc Ó Cathasaigh (GP)	Mary Butler (FF)	Matt Shanahan (Ind.)
34th	2024	David Cullinane (SF)	Conor D. McGuinness (SF)	Mary Butler (FF)	John Cummins (FG)
