= 2004 Clare County Council election =

2004 Irish local government election

← 1999	11 June 2004	2009 →

All 32 seats to Clare County Council
	First party	Second party	Third party
Party	Fianna Fáil	Fine Gael	Green
Seats won	15	10	1
Seat change	-3	+1	+1
	Fourth party	Fifth party	Sixth party
Party	Labour	Independent	Progressive Democrats
Seats won	1	5	0
Seat change	+1	+1	-1
- Map showing the area of Clare County Council
Council control after election
TBD

An election to Clare County Council took place on 11 June 2004 as part of that year's Irish local elections. 32 councillors were elected from six local electoral areas by PR-STV voting for a five-year term of office.

== Results by party ==
Party	Seats	±	First Pref. votes	FPv%	±%
Fianna Fáil	15	-3	22,717	41.51	
Fine Gael	10	+1	15,779	28.83	
Green	1	+1	2,466	4.51	
Labour	1	+1	1,815	3.32	
Independent	5	+1	8,801	16.08	
Progressive Democrats	0	-1	2,103	3.84	
Totals	32	-	54,725	100.00	—

== Results by local electoral area ==
=== Ennis ===
Ennis - 7 seats
Party	Candidate	FPv%	Count									
Party	Candidate	FPv%	1	2	3	4	5	6	7	8	9	10
Fine Gael	Joe Carey*	15.97	1,939									
Fianna Fáil	Pat Daly*	11.60	1,409	1,442	1,459	1,499	1,545					
Independent	Tommy Brennan*	9.75	1,184	1,213	1,231	1,278	1,355	1,420	1,459	1,791		
Fine Gael	Sonny Scanlan*	9.12	1,108	1,166	1,195	1,215	1,233	1,277	1,394	1,441	1,457	1,461
Green	Brian Meaney	8.33	1,011	1,033	1,057	1,105	1,174	1,349	1,425	1,516	1,551	
Fianna Fáil	Peter Considine*	7.72	937	956	963	1,008	1,044	1,069	1,203	1,294	1,359	1,362
Fianna Fáil	Bernard Hanrahan*	6.86	833	913	938	965	985	999	1,160	1,250	1,280	1,281
Independent	Frankie Neylon	6.19	752	770	798	822	875	929	962			
Fine Gael	Tony Mulqueen	6.15	747	835	857	910	942	1,007	1,044	1,177	1,226	1,240
Fianna Fáil	Tom Malone	5.15	626	636	649	674	701	738				
Labour	Paul O'Shea	4.91	596	608	610	629	659					
Sinn Féin	Paddy Barrett	3.59	436	446	464	472						
Progressive Democrats	Roger Leyden	2.96	359	379	384							
Independent	J.J. McCabe	1.70	207	228								
Electorate: 22,471 Valid: 12,144 (54.04%) Spoilt: 215 Quota: 1,519 Turnout: 12,359 (55.00%)

=== Ennistymon ===
Ennistymon - 6 seats
Party	Candidate	FPv%	Count				
Party	Candidate	FPv%	1	2	3	4	5
Fianna Fáil	Michael Kelly	14.49	1,533				
Fine Gael	Joe Arkins*	13.90	1,470	1,624			
Fianna Fáil	Richard Nagle*	11.68	1,235	1,267	1,368	1,376	1,381
Fine Gael	Martin Conway	11.67	1,234	1,324	1,438	1,488	1,506
Fianna Fáil	Michael Hillery*	11.54	1,221	1,251	1,313	1,318	1,321
Fianna Fáil	Flan Garvey*	11.42	1,208	1,272	1,526		
Independent	Martin Lafferty*	11.04	1,168	1,362	1,492	1,541	
Fianna Fáil	Tom Burke*	7.64	808	852			
Green	Ann Marie Flanagan	6.62	700				
Electorate: 15,711 Valid: 10,577 (67.32%) Spoilt: 129 Quota: 1,512 Turnout: 10,706 (68.14%)

=== Killaloe ===
Killaloe - 4 seats
Party	Candidate	FPv%	Count							
Party	Candidate	FPv%	1	2	3	4	5	6	7	8
Fianna Fáil	Cathal Crowe	13.13	940	971	1,105	1,163	1,320	1,326	1,701	
Fine Gael	John McInerney	12.29	880	925	997	1,297	1,454			
Fianna Fáil	Pat O'Gorman*	11.58	829	839	873	938	988	989	1,136	1,233
Fianna Fáil	Tony O'Brien	11.03	790	827	838	934	978	980	1,136	1,239
Labour	Pascal Fitzgerald	10.91	781	865	938	979	1,141	1,149	1,252	1,299
Fianna Fáil	Michael Begley*	10.77	771	791	803	877	975	979		
Fine Gael	Batt Skehan	9.51	681	719	746					
Progressive Democrats	Mary Mannion*	9.12	653	697	757	809				
Independent	Noel Broggy	6.38	457	494						
Green	Mick Murtagh	5.29	379							
Electorate: 11,051 Valid: 7,161 (64.80%) Spoilt: 79 Quota: 1,433 Turnout: 7,240 (65.51%)

=== Kilrush ===
Kilrush - 7 seats
Party	Candidate	FPv%	Count							
Party	Candidate	FPv%	1	2	3	4	5	6	7	8
Independent	Christy Curtin*	13.84	1,564							
Fianna Fáil	P.J. Kelly*	10.52	1,189	1,205	1,221	1,313	1,370	1,402	1,414	
Fine Gael	Oliver Garry*	10.25	1,158	1,169	1,187	1,205	1,251	1,422		
Fine Gael	Madeleine Taylor-Quinn*	9.55	1,079	1,092	1,156	1,183	1,342	1,624		
Fianna Fáil	Tom Prendeville*	9.05	1,022	1,026	1,049	1,083	1,207	1,246	1,273	1,294
Fianna Fáil	Bill Chambers*	8.98	1,015	1,036	1,065	1,197	1,354	1,473		
Fianna Fáil	Patrick Keane*	8.90	1,006	1,011	1,036	1,061	1,123	1,184	1,206	1,228
Independent	Oliver Keating	7.25	819	830	906	951	1,045	1,137	1,191	1,207
Progressive Democrats	Murt Collins	6.74	762	785	813	848				
Fine Gael	Tim Donnellan	5.99	677	698	725	894	980			
Fianna Fáil	Michael Shannon	5.42	612	633	649					
Sinn Féin	Gerry Malone	2.35	265	268						
Green	Cillian Murphy	1.15	130	132						
Electorate: 16,894 Valid: 11,298 (66.88%) Spoilt: 141 Quota: 1,413 Turnout: 11,439 (67.71%)

=== Scariff ===
Scariff - 3 seats
Party	Candidate	FPv%	Count			
Party	Candidate	FPv%	1	2	3	4
Fianna Fáil	Pat Hayes*	26.93	1,469			
Fine Gael	Paul Bugler*	18.26	996	1,113	1,213	1,234
Fianna Fáil	Colm Wiley*	17.77	969	996	1,253	1,322
Fine Gael	Joe Cooney	17.46	952	985	1,278	1,293
Independent	Jim McInerney	12.69	692	793		
Green	Colm O'Brien	4.51	246			
Labour	Stanley Airewele	2.38	130			
Electorate: 7,798 Valid: 5,454 (69.94%) Spoilt: 53 Quota: 1,364 Turnout: 5,507 (70.62%)

=== Shannon ===
Shannon - 5 seats
Party	Candidate	FPv%	Count							
Party	Candidate	FPv%	1	2	3	4	5	6	7	8
Fine Gael	John Crowe*	14.84	1,201	1,214	1,225	1,280	1,300	1,511		
Fine Gael	Tony Mulcahy*	14.77	1,195	1,207	1,252	1,286	1,350			
Independent	Patricia McCarthy*	13.79	1,116	1,134	1,199	1,252	1,353			
Fianna Fáil	Pat McMahon*	12.59	1,019	1,022	1,042	1,077	1,086	1,249	1,290	1,523
Independent	Gerry Flynn	9.43	763	778	829	845	917	956	994	1,418
Fianna Fáil	P.J. Ryan	8.65	700	722	729	761	766	793	803	940
Fianna Fáil	Seán Hillery*	7.12	576	580	598	632	666	692	712	
Fine Gael	Brendan Ryan	5.71	462	465	477	516	533			
Progressive Democrats	Mary O'Donnell	4.07	329	334	340					
Sinn Féin	Cathy McCaffrey	3.83	310	312						
Labour	Tony McMahon	3.81	308	313	353	375				
Independent	Michael Naughton	0.98	79							
Socialist Workers	Dominic Haugh	0.33	27							
Socialist Workers	John McMahon	0.07	6							
Electorate: 14,273 Valid: 8,091 (56.69%) Spoilt: 113 Quota: 1,349 Turnout: 8,204 (57.48%)
