= 2009 Clare County Council election =

Part of the 2009 Irish local elections

← 2004	5 June 2009	2014 →

All 32 seats on Clare County Council
	First party	Second party	Third party
Party	Fine Gael	Fianna Fáil	Labour
Seats won	12	11	1
Seat change	+2	-4	-
	Fourth party	Fifth party
Party	Green	Independent
Seats won	1	7
Seat change	-	+2
- Map showing the area of Clare County Council
Council control after election
TBD

An election to Clare County Council took place on 5 June 2009 as part of that year's Irish local elections. 32 councillors were elected from six local electoral areas (LEAs) for a five-year term of office on the electoral system of proportional representation by means of the single transferable vote (PR-STV).

== Results by party ==
Party	Seats	±	First Pref. votes	FPv%	±%
Fine Gael	12	+2	19,220	34.23	
Fianna Fáil	11	-4	19,959	35.55	
Labour	1	-	2,268	4.04	
Green	1	-	1,291	2.30	
Independent	7	+2	13,252	23.60	
Totals	32	-	56,151	100.00	—

== Results by local electoral area ==
=== Ennis East ===
Ennis East - 5 seats
Party	Candidate	FPv%	Count						
Party	Candidate	FPv%	1	2	3	4	5	6	7
Fine Gael	Johnny Flynn	17.64	1,402						
Fine Gael	Paul Murphy*	16.80	1,335						
Fine Gael	Sonny Scanlan*	15.45	1,228	1,286	1,321	1,326			
Fianna Fáil	Pat Daly*	13.71	1,089	1,106	1,113	1,114	1,319	1,633	
Independent	Tommy Brennan*	11.49	913	951	966	967	1,034	1,142	1,211
Independent	Michael Guilfoyle	8.26	656	708	720	721	803	874	939
Fianna Fáil	Tom Malone	7.03	559	584	590	590	679		
Fianna Fáil	Bernard Hanrahan*	6.61	525	538	540	542			
Independent	J.J. McCabe	3.01	239						
Electorate: 13,666 Valid: 7,946 (58.14%) Spoilt: 88 Quota: 1,325 Turnout: 8,034 (58.79%)

=== Ennis West ===
Ennis West - 4 seats
Party	Candidate	FPv%	Count								
Party	Candidate	FPv%	1	2	3	4	5	6	7	8	9
Independent	James Breen	30.88	1,747								
Fine Gael	Tony Mulqueen	15.50	877	1,023	1,046	1,092	1,166				
Fianna Fáil	Tom McNamara	10.85	614	693	704	714	716	717	805	846	1,084
Green	Brian Meaney*	9.44	534	594	610	632	692	703	771	908	1,020
Independent	Frankie Neylon	6.70	379	454	470	537	565	573	618	753	828
Fianna Fáil	Peter Considine*	5.74	325	382	393	399	403	404			
Fianna Fáil	Garrett Greene	5.62	318	369	385	398	407	407	530	595	
Independent	Rita McInerney	4.93	279	357	381	409	467	480	514		
Labour	Paul O'Shea	4.08	231	247	264	286					
Independent	Martin White	3.41	193	221	244						
Sinn Féin	Seán Hayes	2.85	161	186							
Electorate: 22,471 Valid: 12,144 (54.04%) Spoilt: 215 Quota: 1,519 Turnout: 12,359 (55.00%)

=== Ennistymon ===
Ennistymon - 5 seats
Party	Candidate	FPv%	Count				
Party	Candidate	FPv%	1	2	3	4	5
Fine Gael	Martin Conway*	18.35	1,820				
Fianna Fáil	Michael Hillery	16.34	1,621	1,634	1,640	1,663	
Fianna Fáil	Michael Kelly*	15.95	1,582	1,590	1,598	1,613	1,765
Fianna Fáil	Richard Nagle*	14.40	1,428	1,452	1,454	1,521	1,848
Fine Gael	Joe Arkins*	13.93	1,382	1,459	1,484	1,573	1,690
Fianna Fáil	Michelle Moroney	8.06	800	808	814	845	
Green	Ann Marie Flanagan	7.63	757	781	804	944	1,068
Independent	Eugene McNamara	3.99	396	407	446		
Independent	Paddy Kenneally	1.35	134	135			
Electorate: 14,446 Valid: 9,920 (68.67%) Spoilt: 129 Quota: 1,654 Turnout: 10,005 (69.26%)

=== Killaloe ===
Killaloe - 6 seats
Party	Candidate	FPv%	Count				
Party	Candidate	FPv%	1	2	3	4	5
Fine Gael	Joe Cooney*	24.43	2,780				
Fianna Fáil	Pat Hayes*	14.07	1,601	1,952			
Labour	Pascal Fitzgerald*	13.10	1,491	1,532	1,549	1,676	
Independent	Michael Begley	11.55	1,314	1,386	1,413	1,641	
Fianna Fáil	Cathal Crowe*	11.51	1,310	1,343	1,379	1,487	1,531
Fianna Fáil	Tony O'Brien*	9.89	1,125	1,193	1,271	1,338	1,385
Fine Gael	Pat Burke	9.25	1,053	1,505	1,604	1,886	
Fine Gael	John McInerney*	6.20	705	842	869		
Electorate: 17,493 Valid: 11,379 (65.05%) Spoilt: 96 Quota: 1,696 Turnout: 11,475 (65.60%)

=== Kilrush ===
Kilrush - 6 seats
Party	Candidate	FPv%	Count				
Party	Candidate	FPv%	1	2	3	4	5
Independent	Christy Curtin*	15.33	1,733				
Fine Gael	Oliver Garry*	15.18	1,716				
Fianna Fáil	P.J. Kelly*	13.57	1,533	1,551	1,575	1,646	
Fianna Fáil	Patrick Keane*	12.00	1,356	1,364	1,367	1,426	1,651
Fine Gael	Gabriel Keating	11.02	1,245	1,262	1,301	1,442	1,618
Fianna Fáil	Bill Chambers*	10.34	1,168	1,190	1,200	1,314	1,635
Fianna Fáil	Tom Prendeville*	8.62	974	979	982	1,047	
Independent	Ciaran O'Dea	8.16	922	958	963	1,097	1,219
Independent	Anne Breen	5.79	654	666	683		
Electorate: 16,804 Valid: 11,301 (67.25%) Spoilt: 127 Quota: 1,615 Turnout: 11,428 (68.01%)

=== Shannon ===
Shannon - 6 seats
Party	Candidate	FPv%	Count						
Party	Candidate	FPv%	1	2	3	4	5	6	7
Fine Gael	John Crowe*	15.85	1,577						
Fine Gael	Tony Mulcahy*	13.41	1,334	1,362	1,380	1,412	1,534		
Independent	Patricia McCarthy*	12.82	1,275	1,287	1,303	1,345	1,468		
Fianna Fáil	Pat McMahon*	10.69	1,063	1,068	1,114	1,122	1,135	1,138	1,371
Independent	Gerry Flynn	10.65	1,059	1,066	1,084	1,134	1,252	1,286	1,337
Independent	P.J. Ryan	10.18	1,013	1,063	1,083	1,140	1,169	1,179	1,524
Fianna Fáil	Pat O'Gorman	7.96	792	803	852	886	900	907	
Fine Gael	Marinella Raftery	7.70	766	794	803	837	916	967	1,125
Labour	Tony McMahon	5.49	546	551	568	595			
Independent	Noel Broggy	3.06	304	308	317				
Fianna Fáil	Eamon Fennessy	1.77	176	180					
Independent	Damon Wise	0.42	42	43					
Electorate: 16,617 Valid: 9,947 (59.86%) Spoilt: 113 Quota: 1,422 Turnout: 10,032 (60.37%)
