= 2024 Clare County Council election =

Part of the 2024 Irish local elections

- 7 June 2024

All 28 seats on Clare County Council 15 seats needed for a majority
| | First party | Second party | Third party |
|---|---|---|---|
| Party | Fianna Fáil | Fine Gael | Sinn Féin |
| Last election | 13 | 8 | 1 |
| Seats won | 14 | 9 | 2 |
| Seat change | ▲1 | ▲1 | ▲1 |
| | Fourth party | Fifth party |
| Party | Green | Independent |
| Last election | 1 | 5 |
| Seats won | 0 | 3 |
| Seat change | ▼1 | ▼2 |
- Area of Clare County Council

An election to all 28 seats on Clare County Council was held on 7 June 2024 as part of the 2024 Irish local elections. County Clare is divided into 5 local electoral areas (LEAs) to elect councillors for a five-year term of office on the electoral system of proportional representation by means of the single transferable vote (PR-STV).

== Results by party ==
| Party | First-preference votes | | | Seats | | | |
| Party | Votes | % FPv | Swing (pp) | Cand. | 2019 | Elected 2024 | Change |
|---|---|---|---|---|---|---|---|
| Fianna Fáil | 21,034 | 39.10 | ▲0.51 | 16 | 13 | 14 | ▲1 |
| Fine Gael | 15,608 | 29.01 | ▼2.69 | 11 | 8 | 9 | ▲1 |
| Sinn Féin | 3,929 | 7.30 | ▲2.42 | 6 | 1 | 2 | ▲1 |
| Green | 2,735 | 5.08 | ▲1.11 | 5 | 1 | 0 | ▼1 |
| Independent Ireland | 1,805 | 3.36 | New | 3 | New | New | New |
| Social Democrats | 1,211 | 2.25 | ▲0.57 | 2 | 0 | 0 | Steady |
| Labour | 515 | 0.96 | ▼0.02 | 2 | 0 | 0 | Steady |
| Aontú | 275 | 0.51 | New | 1 | New | New | New |
| Irish Freedom | 287 | 0.53 | New | 1 | New | New | New |
| Farmers' Alliance | 234 | 0.43 | New | 1 | New | New | New |
| The Irish People | 127 | 0.24 | New | 1 | New | New | New |
| Independent | 6,038 | 11.22 | ▼6.98 | 10 | 5 | 3 | ▼2 |
| Total Valid | 53,798 | 98.95 | | | | | |
| Spoilt votes | 571 | 1.05 | | | | | |
| Total | 54,369 | 100 | — | 59 | 28 | 28 | Steady |
| Registered voters/Turnout | 98,937 | 54.95 | | | | | |

== Retiring incumbents ==
The following councillors did not seek re-election:

| Constituency | Councillor | Party |
|---|---|---|
| Ennis | Johnny Flynn | Fine Gael |
| Kilrush | PJ Kelly | Fianna Fáil |
| Ennis | Ann Norton | Independent |

== Results by local electoral area ==
*: Outgoing councillor elected in 2019.
†: Outgoing councillor coopted subsequent to the 2019 election.

=== Ennis ===
Ennis: 7 seats
| Party | Candidate | FPv% | Count | | | | | | | |
| Party | Candidate | FPv% | 1 | 2 | 3 | 4 | 5 | 6 | 7 | 8 |
|---|---|---|---|---|---|---|---|---|---|---|
| Fianna Fáil | Pat Daly | 15.56 | 1,832 | | | | | | | |
| Fine Gael | Mary Howard | 12.18 | 1,434 | 1,485 | | | | | | |
| Fine Gael | Paul Murphy | 11.31 | 1,332 | 1,363 | 1,369 | 1,389 | 1,429 | 1,463 | 1,467 | 1,537 |
| Fianna Fáil | Clare Colleran Molloy | 10.12 | 1,192 | 1,266 | 1,267 | 1,290 | 1,320 | 1,346 | 1,350 | 1,404 |
| Sinn Féin | Tommy Guilfoyle | 10.11 | 1,191 | 1,215 | 1,220 | 1,255 | 1,289 | 1,338 | 1,338 | 1,470 |
| Fianna Fáil | Antoinette Bashua | 9.92 | 1,168 | 1,233 | 1,236 | 1,322 | 1,383 | 1,422 | 1,424 | 1,502 |
| Fianna Fáil | Tom O'Callaghan | 8.81 | 1,038 | 1,106 | 1,111 | 1,127 | 1,161 | 1,206 | 1,207 | 1,271 |
| Green | Bridget Ginnity | 5.99 | 705 | 716 | 718 | 763 | 833 | 873 | 873 | 1,113 |
| Social Democrats | Hilary Tonge | 5.08 | 598 | 606 | 607 | 639 | 735 | 822 | 823 | |
| Labour | Seamus Ryan | 3.59 | 423 | 434 | 435 | 471 | | | | |
| Independent | Ruairi Keenan | 3.39 | 399 | 406 | 433 | 487 | 527 | | | |
| Independent | Amanda Major | 3.36 | 396 | 403 | 410 | | | | | |
| Independent | Jacek Kazimierz Kwasny | 0.58 | 68 | 70 | | | | | | |
Electorate: 24,226 Valid: 11,776 Spoilt: 183 Quota: 1,473 Turnout: 11,959 (49.36%)

=== Ennistymon ===
Ennistymon: 4 seats
| Party | Candidate | FPv% | Count | | | | | |
| Party | Candidate | FPv% | 1 | 2 | 3 | 4 | 5 | 6 |
|---|---|---|---|---|---|---|---|---|
| Fine Gael | Bill Slattery | 24.72% | 2,244 | | | | | |
| Fine Gael | Joe Garrihy | 19.76% | 1,794 | 1,901 | | | | |
| Fianna Fáil | Joe Killeen | 17.56% | 1,594 | 1,637 | 1,659 | 1,673 | 1,707 | 1,779 |
| Fianna Fáil | Shane Talty | 17.29% | 1,569 | 1,758 | 1,789 | 1,807 | 1,846 | |
| Green | Liam Grant | 12.67% | 1,150 | 1,203 | 1,223 | 1,272 | 1,346 | 1,436 |
| Sinn Féin | Conor O'Sullivan | 3.00% | 273 | 284 | 286 | 307 | | |
| Farmers' Alliance | Pam O'Loughlin | 2.58% | 234 | 251 | 253 | 333 | 401 | |
| The Irish People | Mike Loughrey | 1.40% | 127 | 129 | 130 | | | |
| Labour | Denis Vaughan | 1.01% | 92 | 98 | 100 | | | |
Electorate: 15,032 Valid: 9,077 Spoilt: 82 Quota: 1,816 Turnout: 9,159 (60.93%)

=== Killaloe ===
Killaloe: 5 seats
| Party | Candidate | FPv% | Count | | | | | |
| Party | Candidate | FPv% | 1 | 2 | 3 | 4 | 5 | 6 |
|---|---|---|---|---|---|---|---|---|
| Fine Gael | Joe Cooney | 27.10% | 2,819 | | | | | |
| Fianna Fáil | Pat Hayes | 15.37% | 1,599 | 1,908 | | | | |
| Fianna Fáil | Alan O'Callaghan | 14.18% | 1,475 | 1,690 | 1,739 | | | |
| Fianna Fáil | Tony O'Brien | 12.14% | 1,263 | 1,365 | 1,393 | 1,417 | 1,450 | 1,577 |
| Fine Gael | Pat Burke | 10.08% | 1,049 | 1,322 | 1,375 | 1,414 | 1,444 | 1,695 |
| Independent Ireland | Matthew Moroney | 8.27% | 860 | 958 | 983 | 1,016 | 1,105 | 1,335 |
| Social Democrats | Fiona Levie | 5.89% | 613 | 658 | 669 | 876 | 1,050 | |
| Sinn Féin | Martina Cleary | 3.64% | 379 | 402 | 405 | 441 | | |
| Green | Audrey Flynn | 3.34% | 347 | 366 | 370 | | | |
Electorate: 17,151 Valid: 10,404 Spoilt: 77 Quota: 1,735 Turnout: 10,481 (61.11%)

=== Kilrush ===
Kilrush: 5 seats
| Party | Candidate | FPv% | Count | | | | | | | | | |
| Party | Candidate | FPv% | 1 | 2 | 3 | 4 | 5 | 6 | 7 | 8 | 9 | 10 |
|---|---|---|---|---|---|---|---|---|---|---|---|---|
| Fianna Fáil | Rita McInerney | 12.29% | 1,340 | 1,364 | 1,404 | 1,454 | 1,501 | 1,566 | 1,690 | 1,698 | 1,967 | |
| Independent | Ian Lynch | 12.09% | 1,318 | 1,336 | 1,368 | 1,432 | 1,517 | 1,585 | 1,628 | 1,633 | 1,950 | |
| Independent | Dinny Gould | 12.02% | 1,310 | 1,350 | 1,365 | 1,440 | 1,542 | 1,720 | 1,863 | | | |
| Fianna Fáil | Michael Shannon | 9.64% | 1,051 | 1,060 | 1,064 | 1,079 | 1,096 | 1,201 | 1,443 | 1,457 | 1,528 | 1,570 |
| Fine Gael | Gabriel Keating | 9.53% | 1,039 | 1,056 | 1,112 | 1,187 | 1,217 | 1,256 | 1,504 | 1,518 | 1,763 | 1,826 |
| Fianna Fáil | Cillian Murphy | 9.27% | 1,011 | 1,016 | 1,043 | 1,089 | 1,121 | 1,137 | 1,159 | 1,162 | | |
| Fianna Fáil | Alan Troy | 9.00% | 982 | 1,013 | 1,040 | 1,071 | 1,083 | 1,115 | 1,166 | 1,168 | 1,323 | 1,368 |
| Fine Gael | Therese Doohan | 7.30% | 796 | 808 | 846 | 858 | 890 | 966 | | | | |
| Independent Ireland | Joe Woulfe | 4.56% | 497 | 550 | 567 | 651 | 707 | | | | | |
| Sinn Féin | Dawn Bennett | 4.50% | 490 | 498 | 528 | 544 | | | | | | |
| Independent Ireland | Kevin Hassett | 4.11% | 448 | 479 | 492 | | | | | | | |
| Green | Susan Griffin | 3.05% | 332 | 336 | | | | | | | | |
| Irish Freedom | John Hill | 2.63% | 287 | | | | | | | | | |
Electorate: 18,802 Valid: 10,901 Spoilt: 91 Quota: 1,817 Turnout: 10,992 (58.46%)

=== Shannon ===
Shannon: 7 seats
| Party | Candidate | FPv% | Count | | | | | | | | | | |
| Party | Candidate | FPv% | 1 | 2 | 3 | 4 | 5 | 6 | 7 | 8 | 9 | 10 | 11 |
|---|---|---|---|---|---|---|---|---|---|---|---|---|---|
| Fianna Fáil | David Griffin | 13.18% | 1,534 | | | | | | | | | | |
| Fine Gael | John Crowe | 10.79% | 1,256 | 1,258 | 1,268 | 1,271 | 1,293 | 1,313 | 1,318 | 1,337 | 1,343 | 1,463 | |
| Fianna Fáil | Rachel Hartigan | 10.33% | 1,203 | 1,203 | 1,215 | 1,220 | 1,255 | 1,268 | 1,371 | 1,405 | 1,413 | 1,760 | |
| Fianna Fáil | Pat O'Gorman | 10.16% | 1,183 | 1,184 | 1,205 | 1,208 | 1,217 | 1,242 | 1,266 | 1,301 | 1,307 | 1,352 | 1,407 |
| Sinn Féin | Donna McGettigan | 9.80% | 1,141 | 1,141 | 1,146 | 1,162 | 1,188 | 1,221 | 1,443 | 1,587 | | | |
| Fine Gael | Tony Mulcahy | 8.82% | 1,027 | 1,028 | 1,037 | 1,041 | 1,052 | 1,064 | 1,067 | 1,197 | 1,248 | 1,284 | 1,324 |
| Independent | PJ Ryan | 8.47% | 986 | 991 | 1,000 | 1,012 | 1,031 | 1,068 | 1,079 | 1,197 | 1,220 | 1,235 | 1,242 |
| Independent | Michael Begley | 7.14% | 831 | 833 | 834 | 865 | 875 | 902 | 930 | 991 | 1,005 | 1,235 | 1,370 |
| Fine Gael | Val Gillane | 7.03% | 818 | 818 | 819 | 821 | 836 | 843 | 873 | 879 | 879 | | |
| Independent | Keith McNamara | 4.71% | 548 | 558 | 562 | 598 | 610 | 656 | 671 | | | | |
| Sinn Féin | James Ryan | 3.90% | 455 | 455 | 456 | 460 | 475 | 483 | | | | | |
| Aontú | John Haugh | 2.36% | 275 | 278 | 281 | 297 | 304 | | | | | | |
| Green | Fursa Cavanagh | 1.73% | 201 | 201 | 202 | 205 | | | | | | | |
| Independent | Pat Barry | 1.30% | 151 | 157 | 158 | | | | | | | | |
| Independent | Conor O'Brien | 0.27% | 32 | | | | | | | | | | |
Electorate: 23,726 Valid: 11,641 Spoilt: 138 Quota: 1,456 Turnout: 11,779 (49.65%)

== Changes ==
=== Co-options ===
| Party | Outgoing | LEA | Reason | Date | Co-optee |
|---|---|---|---|---|---|
| Sinn Féin | Donna McGettigan | Shannon | Elected to 34th Dáil at the 2024 general election | 10 December 2024 | James Ryan |
| Fine Gael | Joe Cooney | Killaloe | Elected to 34th Dáil at the 2024 general election | 19 December 2024 | Conor Ryan |
