= 2019 Clare County Council election =

Part of the 2019 Irish local elections

← 2014	24 May 2019	2024 →

All 28 seats on Clare County Council 15 seats needed for a majority
	First party	Second party	Third party
Party	Fianna Fáil	Fine Gael	Sinn Féin
Seats won	13	8	1
Seat change	▲1	Steady	Steady
	Fourth party	Fifth party
Party	Green	Independent
Seats won	1	5
Seat change	▲1	▼2
- Results by Local Electoral Area
Council control after election
TBD

An election to all 28 seats on Clare County Council took place on 24 May 2019 as part of the 2019 Irish local elections. Councillors were elected for a five-year term of office from 5 local electoral areas (LEAs) on the electoral system of proportional representation by means of the single transferable vote (PR-STV).

== Boundary review ==
Following a recommendation of the 2018 Boundary Committee, the boundaries of the LEAs in County Clare were altered from those used in the 2014 election. Its terms of reference required no change in the total number of councillors but set a maximum LEA size of seven councillors, whereas in 2014, the West Clare LEA had eight. Other changes were necessitated by population shifts revealed by the 2016 census.

== Results by party ==
Party	Seats	±	1st pref	FPv%	±%
Fianna Fáil	13	▲1	19,515	38.59	▲2.86
Fine Gael	8	Steady	16,032	31.70	▲0.22
Sinn Féin	1	Steady	2,468	4.88	▲0.64
Green	1	▲1	2,010	3.97	▲3.02
Social Democrats	0	Steady	849	1.68	New
Labour	0	Steady	495	0.98	▼2.16
Independent	5	▼2	9,203	18.20	▼3.32
Totals	28	Steady	50,572	100.00	

== Results by local electoral area ==
*: Outgoing councillor elected in 2014.

=== Ennis ===
Ennis: 7 seats
Party	Candidate	FPv%	Count									
Party	Candidate	FPv%	1	2	3	4	5	6	7	8	9	10
Fine Gael	Mary Howard	11.46%	1,311	1,311	1,318	1,340	1,423	1,484				
Fine Gael	Johnny Flynn	10.84%	1,240	1,244	1,251	1,271	1,344	1,387	1,395	1,541		
Fianna Fáil	Mark Nestor (Note: See changes below.)	10.59%	1,211	1,211	1,228	1,270	1,326	1,401	1,407	1,576		
Fianna Fáil	Clare Colleran Molloy	10.35%	1,184	1,186	1,195	1,225	1,262	1,345	1,350	1,437		
Fine Gael	Paul Murphy	10.95%	1,252	1,253	1,256	1,275	1,306	1,332	1,344	1,400	1,420	1,444
Independent	Ann Norton	8.09%	925	927	944	1,007	1,082	1,143	1,154	1,328	1,368	1,396
Fianna Fáil	Pat Daly	9.30%	1,064	1,066	1,071	1,091	1,104	1,161	1,165	1,228	1,265	1,293
Independent	Dermot Hayes	6.93%	793	799	808	886	949	1,012	1,013	1,134	1,152	1,170
Independent	Alfonso D'Auria	6.25%	715	715	736	796	862	952	958			
Independent	Frank 'Pinky' Cullinan	4.91%	562	563	565	591	604					
Labour	Seamus Ryan	4.33%	495	497	529	588						
Sinn Féin	Donna McGettigan	2.42%	277	277	288							
Independent	Amanda Major	1.75%	200	210	229							
Social Democrats	Chris Kirwan	1.50%	172	174								
Independent	Andre Hakizimana	0.31%	35									
Electorate: 22,744 Valid: 11,436 Spoilt: 163 Quota: 1,430 Turnout: 11,599 (50.99%)

=== Ennistymon ===
Ennistymon: 4 seats
Party	Candidate	FPv%	Count			
Party	Candidate	FPv%	1	2	3	4
Fianna Fáil	Shane Talty	22.99%	1,977			
Fianna Fáil	Joe Killeen	13.91%	1,196	1,247	1,287	1,781
Fine Gael	Joe Garrihy	15.45%	1,328	1,411	1,453	1,650
Green	Róisín Garvey	15.14%	1,302	1,507	1,539	1,647
Fine Gael	Bill Slattery	15.15%	1,303	1,367	1,451	1,579
Fianna Fáil	Martin O'Loghlen	10.67%	917	980	1,039	
Sinn Féin	Noeleen Moran	6.69%	575			
Electorate: 13,920 Valid: 8,598 Spoilt: 112 Quota: 1,720 Turnout: 8,710 (62.57%)

=== Killaloe ===
Killaloe: 5 seats
Party	Candidate	FPv%	Count					
Party	Candidate	FPv%	1	2	3	4	5	6
Fine Gael	Joe Cooney	26.65%	2,697					
Fianna Fáil	Pat Hayes	13.69%	1,386	1,648	1,686	1,899		
Fine Gael	Pat Burke	10.24%	1,036	1,280	1,311	1,367	1,395	1,577
Fianna Fáil	Alan O'Callaghan	11.04%	1,117	1,281	1,309	1,417	1,474	1,565
Fianna Fáil	Tony O'Brien	12.12%	1,227	1,331	1,392	1,416	1,432	1,536
Fine Gael	Ger O'Halloran	10.20%	1,032	1,104	1,119	1,168	1,190	1,287
Green	Barry O'Donovan	7.00%	708	746	891	966	981	
Independent	Joe Floyd	5.25%	531	615	659			
Social Democrats	Beckha Doyle	1.96%	198	221				
Sinn Féin	Seán Naughton	1.87%	189	208				
Electorate: 16,040 Valid: 10,121 Spoilt: 103 Quota: 1,687 Turnout: 10,224 (63.74%)

=== Kilrush ===
Kilrush: 5 seats
Party	Candidate	FPv%	Count					
Party	Candidate	FPv%	1	2	3	4	5	6
Fianna Fáil	P.J. Kelly	23.40%	2,147					
Fianna Fáil	Bill Chambers	15.60%	1,431	1,683				
Fine Gael	Gabriel Keating	16.28%	1,494	1,624				
Fianna Fáil	Cillian Murphy	12.10%	1,110	1,194	1,200	1,287	1,302	1,513
Independent	Ian Lynch	11.18%	1,026	1,081	1,108	1,145	1,187	1,483
Independent	Joseph Woulfe	11.27%	1,034	1,090	1,104	1,118	1,133	1,299
Fine Gael	Mike Taylor	5.15%	473	492	498	508	527	
Sinn Féin	Violet-Anne Wynne	4.20%	385	399	409	414	417	
Independent	Noreen Lynch	0.83%	76	83				
Electorate: 18,104 Valid: 9,176 Spoilt: 160 Quota: 1,530 Turnout: 9,336 (51.57%)

=== Shannon ===
Shannon: 7 seats
Party	Candidate	FPv%	Count					
Party	Candidate	FPv%	1	2	3	4	5	6
Fianna Fáil	Cathal Crowe	22.91%	2,575					
Fine Gael	John Crowe	11.64%	1,308	1,429				
Independent	Michael Begley	9.14%	1,027	1,278	1,423			
Independent	P. J. Ryan	11.01%	1,238	1,349	1,395	1,404	1,407	
Fianna Fáil	Pat McMahon	8.66%	973	1,133	1,157	1,160	1,162	1,232
Sinn Féin	Mike McKee	9.27%	1,042	1,077	1,146	1,148	1,149	1,217
Independent	Gerry Flynn	9.26%	1,041	1,075	1,128	1,130	1,134	1,200
Fine Gael	Garret McPhillips	8.35%	939	966	991	993	994	1,196
Fine Gael	Eugene Long	5.51%	619	879	980	985	991	
Social Democrats	Betty Walsh	4.26%	479	649				
Electorate: 22,467 Valid: 11,241 Spoilt: 143 Quota: 1,406 Turnout: 11,384 (50.67%)

== Results by gender ==
2019 Clare County Council election Candidates by gender
Gender	Number of candidates	% of candidates	Elected councillors	% of councillors
Men	40	78.4%	24	85.7%
Women	11	21.6%	4	14.3%
TOTAL	51		28	

== Changes ==
=== Co-options ===
Party	Outgoing	LEA	Reason	Date	Co-optee
Sinn Féin	Mike McKee	Shannon	Death	December 2019	Donna McGettigan
Fianna Fáil	Cathal Crowe	Shannon	Elected to 33rd Dáil at the 2020 general election	February 2020	Pat O'Gorman
Green	Róisín Garvey	Ennistymon	Nominated by the Taoiseach to Seanad Éireann	June 2020	Susan Crawford
Green	Susan Crawford	Ennistymon	Resignation	August 2021	Liam Grant
Fianna Fáil	Mark Nestor	Ennis	Resignation to enter the priesthood	8 September 2022	Tom O'Callaghan
Fianna Fáil	Bill Chambers	Kilrush	Retirement.	17 December 2023	Rita McInerney

Name	LEA	Elected as	New affiliation	Date
Johnny Flynn	Ennis	Fine Gael	Independent	28 May 2024

== Sources ==
- "Local Elections 2019: Results, Transfer of Votes and Statistics" (PDF). Department of Housing, Planning and Local Government (DHPLG). pp. 72–76. Archived from the original (PDF) on 10 June 2020.
- "Clare County Council – Local Election candidates". RTÉ News. 14 May 2019. Archived from the original on 11 August 2020.
- "Facts and Figures". Local elections 2019. Clare County Council. Archived from the original on 5 September 2020.
