= 2014 Clare County Council election =

Part of the 2014 Irish local elections

← 2009	23 May 2014	2019 →

All 28 seats to Clare County Council
	First party	Second party	Third party
Party	Fianna Fáil	Fine Gael	Sinn Féin
Seats won	12	8	1
Seat change	+1	-4	+1
	Fourth party	Fifth party	Sixth party
Party	Independent	Labour	Green
Seats won	7	0	0
Seat change	-	-1	-1
- Map showing the area of Clare County Council
Cathaoirleach before election
Joe Arkins
FG
Subsequent Cathaoirleach
John Crowe
FG

An election to all 28 seats on Clare County Council was held on 23 May 2014 as part of the 2014 Irish local elections. County Clare was divided into four local electoral areas (LEAs) to elect councillors for a five-year term of office on the electoral system of proportional representation by means of the single transferable vote (PR-STV). This was a reduction in 4 council seats and 2 LEAs compared to the previous elections held in 2009.

Fianna Fáil re-emerged as the largest party in County Clare after the elections with 12 seats. In addition Clare Colleran-Molloy, a sister of the journalist Ger Colleran, won a seat for the party in Ennis and became the party's first ever female elected councillor. Brian Meaney, formerly of the Green Party, had defected to Fianna Fáil but failed to be re-elected. Fine Gael lost 4 seats including that of the council's outgoing cathaoirleach, Joe Arkins, in Killaloe. The Labour Party lost their sole representative while Sinn Féin won a seat on the council for the first time since 1974. Despite some retirements Independents retained a share of 7 seats.

== Results by party ==
Party	Seats	±	1st pref	FPv%
Fianna Fáil	12	+1	18,432	35.73
Fine Gael	8	-4	16,239	31.48
Sinn Féin	1	+1	2,188	4.24
Independent	7	-	11,100	21.52
Labour	0	-1	1,622	3.14
Green	0	-1	490	0.95
Total	28	-4	51,583	100.00

== Results by local electoral area ==
*: Outgoing councillor.

=== Ennis ===
Ennis: 8 seats
Party	Candidate	FPv%	Count																			
Party	Candidate	FPv%	1	2	3	4	5	6	7	8	9	10	11	12	13	14	15	16	17	18	19	20
Independent	James Breen	8.81	1,134	1,141	1,157	1,188	1,199	1,218	1,235	1,279	1,339	1,387	1,449									
Fine Gael	Johnny Flynn	8.55	1,100	1,104	1,118	1,138	1,168	1,184	1,210	1,227	1,254	1,322	1,351	1,481								
Fianna Fáil	Tom McNamara	8.15	1,049	1,053	1,055	1,061	1,068	1,075	1,115	1,119	1,128	1,150	1,173	1,221	1,223	1,223	1,265	1,299	1,320	1,360	1,371	1,379
Fianna Fáil	Pat Daly	7.77	1,000	1,003	1,006	1,022	1,027	1,037	1,072	1,086	1,104	1,122	1,138	1,167	1,171	1,173	1,287	1,367	1,418	1,579		
Independent	Ann Norton	6.38	821	1,121	1,125	1,129	1,153	1,224	1,311	1,484												
Fine Gael	Paul Murphy	6.25	804	805	807	807	814	815	826	833	842	871	889	923	928	928	1,061	1,083	1,127	1,167	1,173	1,179
Fine Gael	Gerard O'Halloran	6.25	804	805	808	829	839	841	844	848	853	868	872	912	917	918	933	937	958	985	990	996
Fine Gael	Mary Howard	5.59	720	724	729	738	761	771	806	832	848	894	936	1,014	1,033	1,034	1,072	1,137	1,238	1,316	1,343	1,357
Fianna Fáil	Claire Colleran-Molloy	4.54	584	586	593	599	608	618	647	658	669	684	708	741	746	747	815	851	892	945	979	999
Fianna Fáil	Bernard Hanrahan	3.89	501	502	505	514	516	524	532	534	542	554	569	579	579	579						
Independent	Michael Guilfoyle	3.62	466	468	473	486	493	499	507	518	531	551	579	594	596	603	630					
Independent	Frankie Neylon	3.42	440	443	448	458	460	467	475	486	528	559	588	598	601	603	640	810	881			
Fine Gael	Cillian Griffey	3.30	425	426	433	440	457	465	479	492	501	529	549									
Fine Gael	Tony Mulqueen	3.08	396	404	404	414	420	424	446	458	472											
Sinn Féin	Cathal O'Reilly	3.05	392	396	403	408	413	421	427	442												
Labour	Dermot Hayes	2.59	333	343	364	376	421	472	481	514	533	564	603	622	624	625	642	671				
Independent	Paula McNamara	2.56	330	343	356	365	383	407	414	452	497	512										
Fianna Fáil	Brian Meaney	2.35	302	304	305	306	317	320														
Independent	Paul O'Shea	2.00	257	265	276	286	301	326	330													
Independent	Felix Omorodion	1.83	236	239	292	292	298															
Labour	Seamus Ryan	1.78	229	252	260	263																
Independent	Joe Corbett	1.62	208	211	217																	
Independent	George Atijohn	1.53	197	209																		
Green	Gerben Uunk	0.71	92																			
Fís Nua	Vera Moloney	0.23	30																			
Independent	Tommy Kelly	0.09	12																			
Fís Nua	Damon Wise	0.05	7																			
Electorate: 23,797 Valid: 12,869 (54.08%) Spoilt: 139 Quota: 1,430 Turnout: 13,008 (54.66%)

=== Killaloe ===
Killaloe: 6 seats
Party	Candidate	FPv%	Count						
Party	Candidate	FPv%	1	2	3	4	5	6	7
Fine Gael	Joe Cooney	25.63	2,843						
Fianna Fáil	Pat Hayes	13.43	1,490	1,767					
Independent	Michael Begley	12.53	1,390	1,468	1,475	1,529	1,799		
Fianna Fáil	Tony O'Brien	11.67	1,294	1,391	1,408	1,427	1,465	1,484	1,767
Fine Gael	Pat Burke	7.44	825	1,119	1,148	1,184	1,255	1,270	1,406
Fianna Fáil	Alan O'Callaghan	7.13	791	916	936	991	1,100	1,119	1,323
Fine Gael	Joe Arkins	6.81	755	851	870	925	992	1,019	1,116
Fís Nua	Niamh O'Brien	6.59	731	817	840	903			
Fianna Fáil	Liam Wiley	5.87	651	828	886	909	968		
Labour	Donal Higgins	2.91	323	351	360				
Electorate: 17,593 Valid: 11,093 (63.05%) Spoilt: 88 Quota: 1,585 Turnout: 11,181 (63.55%)

=== Shannon ===
Shannon: 6 seats
Party	Candidate	FPv%	Count									
Party	Candidate	FPv%	1	2	3	4	5	6	7	8	9	10
Fianna Fáil	Cathal Crowe	18.26	1,929									
Fine Gael	John Crowe	11.54	1,219	1,261	1,267	1,276	1,280	1,294	1,304	1,401	1,443	1,615
Independent	Gerry Flynn	9.84	1,040	1,045	1,103	1,140	1,225	1,290	1,343	1,375	1,471	1,510
Fianna Fáil	Pat McMahon	9.69	1,024	1,053	1,055	1,067	1,072	1,130	1,134	1,161	1,188	1,356
Independent	P.J. Ryan	7.44	825	866	894	899	910	949	973	999	1,072	1,389
Sinn Féin	Mike McKee	7.32	773	793	801	816	856	889	917	951	1,153	1,192
Fine Gael	Sean McLoughlin	7.30	771	778	793	847	890	939	955	997	1,016	1,060
Fianna Fáil	Pat O'Gorman	7.09	749	813	816	819	822	885	889	933	960	
Labour	Pascal Fitzgerald	5.87	506	644	645	685	691	692	702			
Anti-Austerity Alliance	David Houlihan	3.78	399	444	455	460	469	476	704	863		
Fianna Fáil	Louise Roche McNamara	3.26	344	361	366	373	392					
Anti-Austerity Alliance	Seónaidh Ní Shíomóin	3.10	327	342	358	375	398	423				
Independent	Cathy McCafferty	2.30	243	247	259	279						
Labour	Tony McMahon	2.19	231	234	239							
Independent	Mike Fleming	1.40	148	155								
Fís Nua	Karen Wise	0.17	18	19								
Electorate: 20,294 Valid: 10,565 (52.06%) Spoilt: 89 Quota: 1,510 Turnout: 10,654 (52.50%)

=== West Clare ===
West Clare: 8 seats
Party	Candidate	FPv%	Count										
Party	Candidate	FPv%	1	2	3	4	5	6	7	8	9	10	11
Independent	Christy Curtin	11.36	1,938										
Fianna Fáil	Richard Nagle	10.76	1,835	1,836	1,857	1,860	1,864	2,049					
Fine Gael	Bill Slattery	10.37	1,769	1,772	1,788	1,792	1,834	2,046					
Fianna Fáil	Michael Hillery	8.26	1,408	1,413	1,427	1,440	1,449	1,551	1,590	1,603	1,722	1,864	1,883
Fianna Fáil	P.J. Kelly	8.11	1,383	1,390	1,395	1,398	1,416	1,442	1,461	1,463	1,560	1,607	1,621
Fine Gael	Oliver Garry	7.18	1,224	1,229	1,236	1,239	1,309	1,392	1,400	1,452	1,464	1,507	1,524
Independent	Ian Lynch	7.14	1,218	1,270	1,349	1,353	1,579	1,608	1,609	1,612	1,737	2,037	
Fianna Fáil	Bill Chambers	6.53	1,113	1,124	1,132	1,136	1,212	1,244	1,252	1,254	1,510	1,594	1,619
Sinn Féin	Noeleen Moran	6.00	1,023	1,036	1,117	1,119	1,156	1,253	1,273	1,298	1,350		
Fine Gael	Gerard Kennedy	5.92	1,010	1,014	1,041	1,042	1,057						
Fianna Fáil	Patrick Keane	5.78	985	989	1,024	1,025	1,063	1,120	1,136	1,141			
Fine Gael	Gabriel Keating	5.58	952	957	988	991	1,078	1,144	1,155	1,203	1,505	1,569	1,590
Fine Gael	Marian McMahon-Jones	3.65	622	644	662	663							
Green	Kevin Heapes	2.33	398	415									
Independent	Joseph Enright	0.53	90										
Independent	Jackie Dale	0.52	88										
Electorate: 28,936 Valid: 17,056 (58.94%) Spoilt: 215 Quota: 1,896 Turnout: 17,271 (59.69%)
