= 1999 Clare County Council election =

Part of the 1999 Irish local elections

- 10 June 1999

All 32 seats to Clare County Council
| | First party | Second party | Third party |
|---|---|---|---|
| Party | Fianna Fáil | Fine Gael | Progressive Democrats |
| Seats won | 18 | 9 | 1 |
| Seat change | +1 | +1 | 0 |
| | Fourth party | Fifth party |
| Party | Independent | Labour |
| Seats won | 4 | 0 |
| Seat change | -1 | -1 |
- Map showing the area of Clare County Council
Council control after election
Fianna Fail

An election to Clare County Council took place on 10 June 1999 as part of that year's Irish local elections. 32 councillors were elected from six local electoral areas by proportional representation by means of the single transferable vote (PR-STV) for a five-year term of office.

== Results by party ==
| Party | Seats | ± | First Pref. votes | FPv% | ±% |
|---|---|---|---|---|---|
| Fianna Fáil | 18 | +1 | 23,505 | 51.24 | |
| Fine Gael | 9 | +1 | 12,232 | 26.66 | |
| Progressive Democrats | 1 | 0 | 907 | 1.97 | |
| Independent | 4 | -1 | 6,457 | 14.08 | |
| Labour | 0 | -1 | 1,429 | 3.12 | |
| Totals | 32 | 0 | 45,875 | 100.00 | — |

== Results by local electoral area ==
=== Ennis ===
Ennis - 7 seats
| Party | Candidate | FPv% | Count | | | | | | | | | | | | |
| Party | Candidate | FPv% | 1 | 2 | 3 | 4 | 5 | 6 | 7 | 8 | 9 | 10 | 11 | 12 | 13 |
|---|---|---|---|---|---|---|---|---|---|---|---|---|---|---|---|
| Fianna Fáil | Pat Daly | 14.43 | 1,351 | | | | | | | | | | | | |
| Fianna Fáil | James Breen* | 13.88 | 1,300 | | | | | | | | | | | | |
| Fine Gael | Sonny Scanlan* | 10.03 | 939 | 944 | 953 | 954 | 961 | 995 | 1,016 | 1,091 | 1,144 | 1,186 | | | |
| Independent | Tommy Brennan* | 9.90 | 927 | 953 | 975 | 984 | 1,001 | 1,021 | 1,049 | 1,102 | 1,184 | | | | |
| Fine Gael | Joe Carey | 8.39 | 786 | 801 | 814 | 821 | 830 | 868 | 901 | 1,031 | 1,091 | 1,187 | | | |
| Fianna Fáil | Bernard Hanrahan* | 8.04 | 753 | 785 | 799 | 800 | 802 | 831 | 838 | 851 | 928 | 997 | 1,002 | 1,004 | 1,009 |
| Fianna Fáil | Peter Considine* | 6.22 | 582 | 617 | 649 | 651 | 662 | 673 | 702 | 737 | 905 | 1,039 | 1,044 | 1,051 | 1,056 |
| Green | Brian Meaney | 6.68 | 625 | 633 | 638 | 644 | 681 | 696 | 773 | 830 | 906 | 993 | 999 | 1,005 | 1,008 |
| Fianna Fáil | Frank Flaherty | 5.43 | 508 | 532 | 550 | 555 | 560 | 579 | 609 | 636 | | | | | |
| Independent | Frankie Neylon* | 5.38 | 504 | 516 | 521 | 527 | 542 | 562 | 606 | 642 | 687 | | | | |
| Fine Gael | Anna Mulqueen* | 4.07 | 381 | 390 | 393 | 397 | 416 | 420 | 455 | | | | | | |
| Labour | Michael Corley | 2.96 | 277 | 282 | 284 | 304 | 339 | 344 | | | | | | | |
| Independent | J.J. McCabe | 2.14 | 200 | 205 | 208 | 208 | 213 | | | | | | | | |
| Labour | Paul Woulfe | 1.68 | 157 | 159 | 161 | 173 | | | | | | | | | |
| Labour | Senan Hogan | 0.78 | 73 | 75 | 76 | | | | | | | | | | |
Electorate: 19,473 Valid: 9,363 (48.08%) Spoilt: 81 Quota: 1,171 Turnout: 9,444 (48.50%)

=== Ennistymon ===
Ennistymon - 6 seats
| Party | Candidate | FPv% | Count | | | | | |
| Party | Candidate | FPv% | 1 | 2 | 3 | 4 | 5 | 6 |
|---|---|---|---|---|---|---|---|---|
| Fianna Fáil | Michael Hillery* | 14.10 | 1,295 | 1,322 | | | | |
| Independent | Martin Lafferty* | 14.09 | 1,294 | 1,413 | | | | |
| Fianna Fáil | Flan Garvey* | 12.30 | 1,130 | 1,149 | 1,153 | 1,267 | 1,315 | |
| Fianna Fáil | Tom Burke* | 12.30 | 1,130 | 1,135 | 1,138 | 1,162 | 1,185 | 1,201 |
| Fianna Fáil | Richard Nagle* | 11.91 | 1,094 | 1,216 | 1,243 | 1,462 | | |
| Fianna Fáil | Michael Kelly* | 11.69 | 1,074 | 1,085 | 1,090 | 1,115 | 1,145 | 1,159 |
| Fine Gael | Joe Arkins | 9.43 | 866 | 972 | 996 | 1,343 | | |
| Fine Gael | Martin Conway | 7.95 | 730 | 875 | 912 | | | |
| Fine Gael | Bill Slattery | 6.24 | 573 | | | | | |
Electorate: 14,481 Valid: 9,186 (63.43%) Spoilt: 87 Quota: 1,313 Turnout: 9,273 (64.04%)

=== Killaloe ===
Killaloe - 4 seats
| Party | Candidate | FPv% | Count | | | | | |
| Party | Candidate | FPv% | 1 | 2 | 3 | 4 | 5 | 6 |
|---|---|---|---|---|---|---|---|---|
| Fianna Fáil | Michael Begley* | 22.40 | 1,146 | | | | | |
| Fine Gael | Tony McMahon* | 20.72 | 1,060 | | | | | |
| Progressive Democrats | Mary Mannion* | 17.73 | 907 | 943 | 996 | 1,010 | 1,239 | |
| Fianna Fáil | Pat O'Gorman | 15.22 | 779 | 804 | 908 | 917 | 953 | 1,000 |
| Fianna Fáil | Eddie Ginivan | 10.51 | 538 | 566 | 685 | 693 | 738 | 785 |
| Labour | Betty Walsh | 7.76 | 397 | 404 | 408 | 413 | | |
| Fianna Fáil | Rodger Carey | 5.67 | 290 | 316 | | | | |
Electorate: 9,680 Valid: 5,117 (52.86%) Spoilt: 48 Quota: 1,024 Turnout: 5,165 (53.36%)

=== Kilrush ===
Kilrush - 7 seats
| Party | Candidate | FPv% | Count | | | | | | | | |
| Party | Candidate | FPv% | 1 | 2 | 3 | 4 | 5 | 6 | 7 | 8 | 9 |
|---|---|---|---|---|---|---|---|---|---|---|---|
| Independent | Christy Curtin* | 12.91 | 1,424 | | | | | | | | |
| Fine Gael | Pat Breen | 12.21 | 1,346 | 1,341 | 1,361 | 1,377 | 1,467 | | | | |
| Fianna Fáil | Bill Chambers* | 11.48 | 1,266 | 1,273 | 1,282 | 1,300 | 1,338 | 1,343 | 1,516 | | |
| Fianna Fáil | P.J. Kelly* | 10.56 | 1,165 | 1,170 | 1,174 | 1,180 | 1,245 | 1,257 | 1,333 | 1,347 | 1,411 |
| Fine Gael | Senator Madeleine Taylor-Quinn* | 10.11 | 1,115 | 1,120 | 1,150 | 1,213 | 1,302 | 1,324 | 1,398 | | |
| Fianna Fáil | Tom Prendeville* | 9.46 | 1,043 | 1,045 | 1,070 | 1,108 | 1,111 | 1,111 | 1,142 | 1,155 | 1,342 |
| Fianna Fáil | Patrick Keane* | 8.57 | 945 | 946 | 957 | 983 | 993 | 996 | 1,048 | 1,104 | 1,177 |
| Fianna Fáil | Seán Keating | 6.70 | 739 | 741 | 748 | 781 | 796 | 797 | 865 | 900 | 1,039 |
| Fine Gael | Pat Fitzpatrick | 5.30 | 584 | 586 | 604 | 644 | 680 | 703 | 735 | 746 | |
| Fianna Fáil | Paddy Cooney | 4.87 | 537 | 546 | 550 | 561 | 643 | 647 | | | |
| Fine Gael | Michael Downes | 3.97 | 438 | 445 | 445 | 453 | | | | | |
| Labour | Jim Connolly | 2.36 | 260 | 261 | 295 | | | | | | |
| Green | Paul Edson | 1.51 | 166 | 167 | | | | | | | |
Electorate: 16,433 Valid: 11,028 (67.11%) Spoilt: 113 Quota: 1,379 Turnout: 11,141 (67.80%)

=== Scariff ===
Scariff - 3 seats
| Party | Candidate | FPv% | Count | | |
| Party | Candidate | FPv% | 1 | 2 | 3 |
|---|---|---|---|---|---|
| Fine Gael | Paul Bugler* | 24.08 | 1,143 | 1,377 | |
| Fianna Fáil | Pat Hayes | 22.67 | 1,076 | 1,186 | 1,234 |
| Fianna Fáil | Colm Wiley* | 21.49 | 1,020 | 1,106 | 1,156 |
| Fianna Fáil | Denis Hayes | 18.90 | 897 | 1,037 | 1,093 |
| Fine Gael | Jim McMahon | 8.05 | 382 | | |
| Independent | Michael Pearl | 4.82 | 229 | | |
Electorate: 6,916 Valid: 4,747 (68.64%) Spoilt: 46 Quota: 1,187 Turnout: 4,793 (68.93%)

=== Shannon ===
Shannon - 5 seats
| Party | Candidate | FPv% | Count | | | | | | | | | |
| Party | Candidate | FPv% | 1 | 2 | 3 | 4 | 5 | 6 | 7 | 8 | 9 | 10 |
|---|---|---|---|---|---|---|---|---|---|---|---|---|
| Independent | Patricia McCarthy* | 16.63 | 1,070 | 1,075 | | | | | | | | |
| Fine Gael | John Crowe | 15.39 | 990 | 1,003 | 1,009 | 1,025 | 1,092 | | | | | |
| Fianna Fáil | Seán Hillery* | 11.89 | 765 | 770 | 785 | 813 | 831 | 895 | 942 | 1,103 | | |
| Fianna Fáil | Pat McMahon* | 9.79 | 630 | 639 | 642 | 644 | 692 | 705 | 726 | 763 | 771 | 990 |
| Fianna Fáil | P.J. Ryan | 7.03 | 452 | 477 | 478 | 480 | 485 | 492 | 596 | 620 | 624 | |
| Fine Gael | Tony Mulcahy | 7.01 | 451 | 454 | 459 | 502 | 539 | 596 | 631 | 719 | 729 | 786 |
| Sinn Féin | Mike McKee | 6.93 | 446 | 448 | 473 | 483 | 485 | 530 | 551 | | | |
| Independent | Tom Casey | 6.54 | 421 | 427 | 436 | 444 | 528 | 564 | 613 | 650 | 658 | 741 |
| Independent | Kevin Hoban | 4.88 | 314 | 316 | 321 | 330 | 338 | 352 | | | | |
| Fine Gael | Jim Woods | 4.43 | 285 | 285 | 287 | 292 | | | | | | |
| Labour | Tony McMahon | 4.12 | 265 | 266 | 280 | 302 | 308 | | | | | |
| Fine Gael | Seán McLoughlin | 2.53 | 163 | 163 | 169 | | | | | | | |
| Socialist Party | Dominic Haugh | 1.68 | 108 | 109 | | | | | | | | |
| Independent | John McMahon | 1.15 | 74 | | | | | | | | | |
Electorate: 12,183 Valid: 6,434 (52.81%) Spoilt: 61 Quota: 1,073 Turnout: 6,495 (53.31%)
