= Madeleine Taylor-Quinn =

Irish former politician (born 1951)

Senator
- In office 17 February 1993 – 12 September 2002
- In office 13 May 1982 – 24 November 1982
- Constituency: Cultural and Educational Panel

Teachta Dála
- In office November 1982 – November 1992
- In office June 1981 – February 1982
- Constituency: Clare

Personal details
- Born: Madeleine Taylor; 26 May 1951 (age 75) Kilkee, Ireland
- Party: Fine Gael
- Spouse: George Quinn (m. 1982)
- Children: 2
- Parent: Frank Taylor (father)
- Education: University College Galway

Madeleine Taylor-Quinn (born 26 May 1951) is an Irish former Fine Gael politician who served as a Senator for the Cultural and Educational Panel from 1981 to 1982 and 1992 to 2002 and a Teachta Dála (TD) for the Clare constituency from 1981 to 1982 and 1982 to 1992.

== Biography ==
Taylor-Quinn is a native of Kilkee, County Clare. She was educated at the Convent of Mercy Secondary School in Kilrush, and at University College Galway, graduating with a Bachelor of Arts (BA), Bachelor of Education (H.Dip.Ed), and Bachelor of Laws (LLB). She began her career as a teacher. She became a founder member of Young Fine Gael in 1977, and Joint Honorary secretary of Fine Gael from 1979 to 1982, the first woman officer in the party.

She was elected to Dáil Éireann on her first attempt, at the 1981 general election, succeeding her father Frank Taylor, who had been a TD from 1969 to 1981. She was County Clare's first-ever female TD, she took her seat in the 22nd Dáil as Fine Gael leader Garret FitzGerald was elected Taoiseach, heading a Fine Gael-Labour Party coalition government.

The government fell in January 1982 when it was defeated in a vote on the budget, and at the February 1982 general election Taylor-Quinn lost her seat to Fine Gael's other candidate, Donal Carey. She was then elected to the 16th Seanad as a Senator for the Cultural and Educational Panel.

She regained her Dáil seat later that year, at the November 1982 general election, and was re-elected at the 1987 and 1989 general elections. She lost her seat at the 1992 general election. She stood again at the 1997 and 2002 elections, but was unsuccessful.

After her Dáil defeat in 1992, Taylor-Quinn was elected to the Seanad Éireann, again for the Cultural and Educational Panel, which re-elected her in 1997 to the 21st Seanad. She was defeated at the 2002 Seanad elections. She also stood as a Fine Gael candidate at the 2004 European Parliament election, for the North-West constituency, achieving over 22,000 votes in the Clare constituency, which was the highest vote of any candidate in any election in County Clare, but was defeated. She again contested the Clare constituency at the 2007 general election, winning 3,592 first preferences. Her party colleagues Pat Breen and Joe Carey won the Fine Gael seats.

In the Dáil, she has served at various times as her party's spokesperson on Tourism, the Marine and Defence. She has held a number of frontbench positions in the Seanad, including Foreign Affairs, Arts, Culture, Gaeltacht and the Islands, Justice, Law Reform and Defence and also served as deputy opposition leader. She has served as a member of the Joint Oireachtas Committee on Marriage Breakdown, the Joint Oireachtas Committee on Women's Rights and the Select Committee on Judicial Separation, on which last she was chair.

Taylor-Quinn was a member of Clare County Council from 1979 to 2009 when she decided to retire from politics. She is a former Mayor of the County Council (2008–2009), and was the first Fine Gael Mayor in Clare. She was also the Fine Gael group leader on the County Council until 2009. She is married to George Quinn, and has two sons.

Dáil	Election	Deputy (Party)	Deputy (Party)	Deputy (Party)	Deputy (Party)	Deputy (Party)
2nd	1921	Éamon de Valera (SF)	Brian O'Higgins (SF)	Seán Liddy (SF)	Patrick Brennan (SF)	4 seats 1921–1923
3rd	1922	Éamon de Valera (AT-SF)	Brian O'Higgins (AT-SF)	Seán Liddy (PT-SF)	Patrick Brennan (PT-SF)	4 seats 1921–1923
4th	1923	Éamon de Valera (Rep)	Brian O'Higgins (Rep)	Conor Hogan (FP)	Patrick Hogan (Lab)	Eoin MacNeill (CnaG)
5th	1927 (Jun)	Éamon de Valera (FF)	Patrick Houlihan (FF)	Thomas Falvey (FP)	Patrick Hogan (Lab)	Patrick Kelly (CnaG)
6th	1927 (Sep)	Éamon de Valera (FF)	Patrick Houlihan (FF)	Martin Sexton (FF)	Patrick Hogan (Lab)	Patrick Kelly (CnaG)
7th	1932	Éamon de Valera (FF)	Seán O'Grady (FF)	Martin Sexton (FF)	Patrick Hogan (Lab)	Patrick Burke (CnaG)
8th	1933	Éamon de Valera (FF)	Seán O'Grady (FF)	Patrick Houlihan (FF)	Patrick Hogan (Lab)	Patrick Burke (CnaG)
9th	1937	Éamon de Valera (FF)	Seán O'Grady (FF)	Thomas Burke (FP)	Patrick Hogan (Lab)	Patrick Burke (FG)
10th	1938	Éamon de Valera (FF)	Seán O'Grady (FF)	Thomas Burke (FP)	Peter O'Loghlen (FF)	Patrick Burke (FG)
11th	1943	Éamon de Valera (FF)	Seán O'Grady (FF)	Thomas Burke (FP)	Patrick Hogan (Lab)	Patrick Burke (FG)
12th	1944	Éamon de Valera (FF)	Seán O'Grady (FF)	Thomas Burke (FP)	Peter O'Loghlen (FF)	Patrick Burke (FG)
12th	1945 by-election	Éamon de Valera (FF)	Seán O'Grady (FF)	Thomas Burke (FP)	Peter O'Loghlen (FF)	Patrick Shanahan (FF)
13th	1948	Éamon de Valera (FF)	Seán O'Grady (FF)	Thomas Burke (FP)	Patrick Hogan (Lab)	4 seats 1948–1969
14th	1951	Éamon de Valera (FF)	Patrick Hillery (FF)	William Murphy (FG)	Patrick Hogan (Lab)	4 seats 1948–1969
15th	1954	Éamon de Valera (FF)	Patrick Hillery (FF)	William Murphy (FG)	Patrick Hogan (Lab)	4 seats 1948–1969
16th	1957	Éamon de Valera (FF)	Patrick Hillery (FF)	William Murphy (FG)	Patrick Hogan (Lab)	4 seats 1948–1969
16th	1959 by-election	Seán Ó Ceallaigh (FF)	Patrick Hillery (FF)	William Murphy (FG)	Patrick Hogan (Lab)	4 seats 1948–1969
17th	1961	Seán Ó Ceallaigh (FF)	Patrick Hillery (FF)	William Murphy (FG)	Patrick Hogan (Lab)	4 seats 1948–1969
18th	1965	Seán Ó Ceallaigh (FF)	Patrick Hillery (FF)	William Murphy (FG)	Patrick Hogan (Lab)	4 seats 1948–1969
18th	1968 by-election	Seán Ó Ceallaigh (FF)	Patrick Hillery (FF)	Sylvester Barrett (FF)	Patrick Hogan (Lab)	4 seats 1948–1969
19th	1969	Frank Taylor (FG)	Patrick Hillery (FF)	Sylvester Barrett (FF)	3 seats 1969–1981	
20th	1973	Frank Taylor (FG)	Brendan Daly (FF)	Sylvester Barrett (FF)	3 seats 1969–1981	
21st	1977	Frank Taylor (FG)	Brendan Daly (FF)	Sylvester Barrett (FF)	3 seats 1969–1981	
22nd	1981	Madeleine Taylor (FG)	Brendan Daly (FF)	Sylvester Barrett (FF)	Bill Loughnane (FF)	4 seats since 1981
23rd	1982 (Feb)	Donal Carey (FG)	Brendan Daly (FF)	Sylvester Barrett (FF)	Bill Loughnane (FF)	4 seats since 1981
24th	1982 (Nov)	Donal Carey (FG)	Brendan Daly (FF)	Sylvester Barrett (FF)	Madeleine Taylor-Quinn (FG)	4 seats since 1981
25th	1987	Donal Carey (FG)	Brendan Daly (FF)	Síle de Valera (FF)	Madeleine Taylor-Quinn (FG)	4 seats since 1981
26th	1989	Donal Carey (FG)	Brendan Daly (FF)	Síle de Valera (FF)	Madeleine Taylor-Quinn (FG)	4 seats since 1981
27th	1992	Donal Carey (FG)	Moosajee Bhamjee (Lab)	Síle de Valera (FF)	Tony Killeen (FF)	4 seats since 1981
28th	1997	Donal Carey (FG)	Brendan Daly (FF)	Síle de Valera (FF)	Tony Killeen (FF)	4 seats since 1981
29th	2002	Pat Breen (FG)	James Breen (Ind.)	Síle de Valera (FF)	Tony Killeen (FF)	4 seats since 1981
30th	2007	Pat Breen (FG)	Joe Carey (FG)	Timmy Dooley (FF)	Tony Killeen (FF)	4 seats since 1981
31st	2011	Pat Breen (FG)	Joe Carey (FG)	Timmy Dooley (FF)	Michael McNamara (Lab)	4 seats since 1981
32nd	2016	Pat Breen (FG)	Joe Carey (FG)	Timmy Dooley (FF)	Michael Harty (Ind.)	4 seats since 1981
33rd	2020	Violet-Anne Wynne (SF)	Joe Carey (FG)	Cathal Crowe (FF)	Michael McNamara (Ind.)	4 seats since 1981
34th	2024	Donna McGettigan (SF)	Joe Cooney (FG)	Cathal Crowe (FF)	Timmy Dooley (FF)	4 seats since 1981
