= Ennis Courthouse =

Judicial facility in County Clare, Ireland

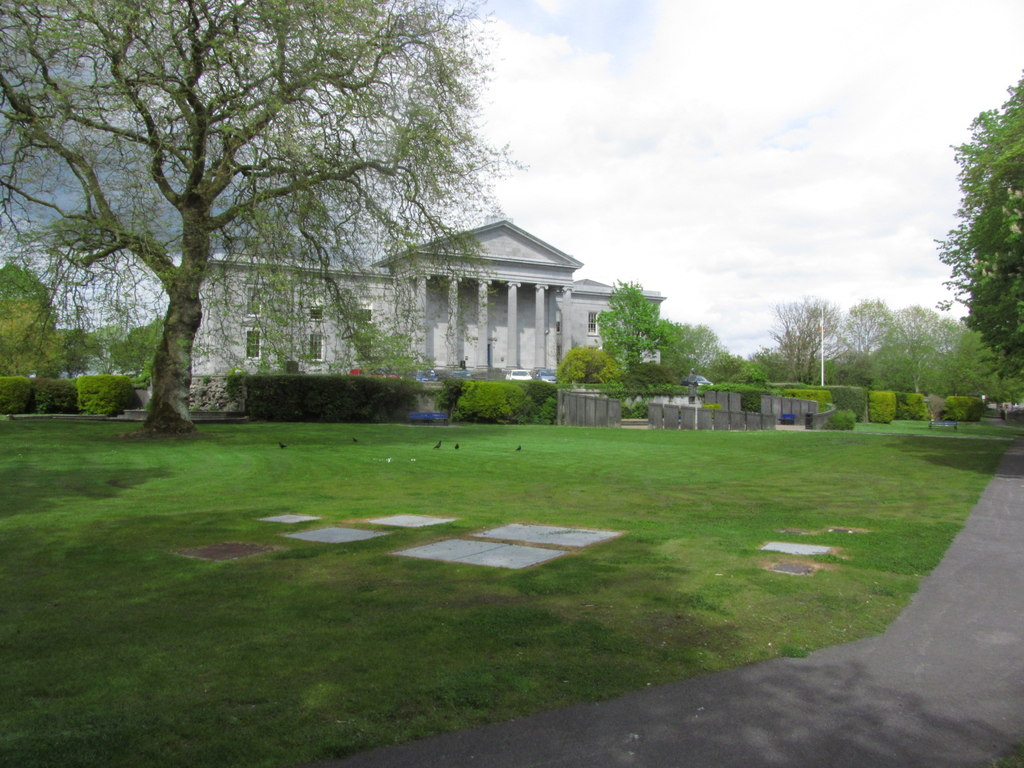
- Ennis Courthouse

- Location within Ireland

General information
- Architectural style: Neoclassical style
- Location: Ennis, County Clare, Ireland
- Coordinates: 52.8487°N 8.9805°W
- Completed: 1852; 174 years ago

Design and construction
- Architects: John Keane and Henry Whitestone

Ennis Courthouse (Irish: Teach Cúirte na hInse) is a judicial facility in Gort Road, Ennis, County Clare, Ireland.

== History ==
The courthouse, which was designed by John Keane and Henry Whitestone in the neoclassical style and built in ashlar stone, was completed in 1852. The design involved a symmetrical main frontage facing the junction of Gort Road and New Road; there was a flight of steps leading up to a large hexastyle portico with Ionic order columns supporting an entablature and a modillioned pediment. A Russian artillery piece, which had been used in the Crimean War, was brought back to Ireland and placed on the lawn outside the building. A statue of Michael O'Loghlen, former Master of Rolls in Ireland, by the sculptor Joseph Robinson Kirk was installed in the courthouse in the mid-19th century.

The building was originally used as a facility for dispensing justice but, following the implementation of the Local Government (Ireland) Act 1898, which established county councils in every county, it also became the meeting place for Clare County Council. A monument to Éamon de Valera, former President of Ireland, was designed by the sculptor Jim Connolly and erected outside the courthouse in 1981. The county council moved to the Áras Contae an Chláir in New Road in May 2008.
