= Áras Contae an Chláir =

Municipal building in County Clare, Ireland

Coordinates: 52.8497°N 8.9757°W

Áras Contae an Chláir (English: County Clare Building) is a municipal building in Ennis, County Clare, Ireland.

Prior to its construction, meetings of Clare County Council were held at Ennis Courthouse. The county building, designed by Henry J Lyons & Partners, was completed in May 2008. It was commended in the public buildings category in the Irish Architecture Awards held by the Royal Institute of the Architects of Ireland in 2008.
