= Martin Conway (Irish politician) =

Irish politician (born 1974)

Senator Martin Conway
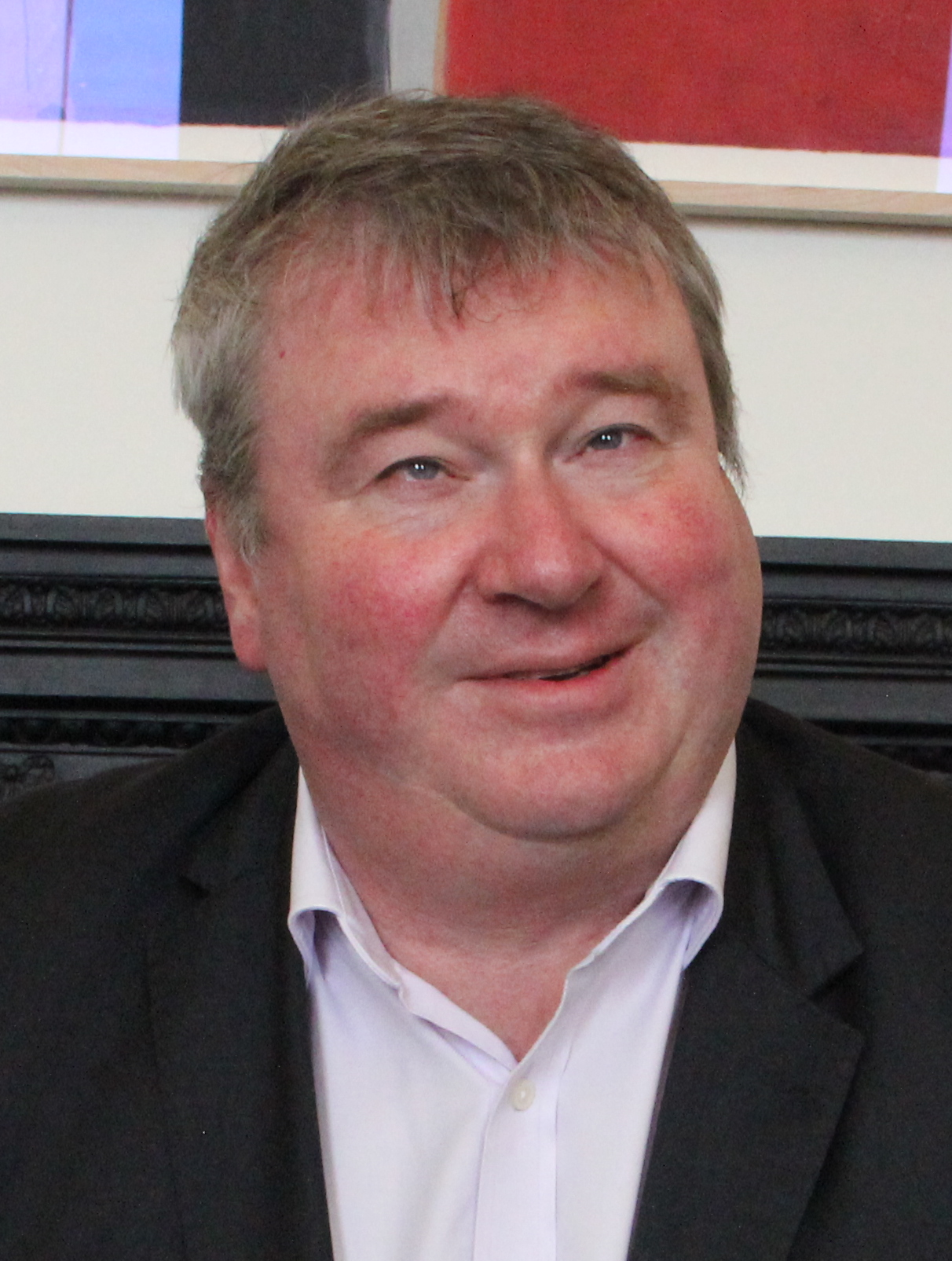
- Conway in 2025

Senator
- Incumbent
- Assumed office 25 May 2011
- Constituency: Administrative Panel

Personal details
- Born: 8 April 1974 (age 52) Ennistymon, County Clare, Ireland
- Party: Independent
- Other political affiliations: Fine Gael (until 2025)
- Education: University College Dublin
- Website: senatormartinconway.com

Martin Conway (born 8 April 1974) is an Irish independent politician who has served as a senator for the Administrative Panel since April 2011.

He was the Fine Gael Seanad spokesperson on Health. Born with congenital cataracts, he is the first visually impaired member of the Oireachtas.

He was a member of Clare County Council from 2004 to 2011 for the Ennistymon local electoral area. He was the Fine Gael Seanad spokesperson on Justice and Equality.

He is a founder member of AHEAD (Association for Higher Education Access and Disability), a charity working to improve access to further and higher education for people with disabilities.

He was an unsuccessful candidate for the Clare constituency at the 2020 general election.

He resigned from the Fine Gael parliamentary party on 9 February 2025 following his arrest for being drunk and disorderly on 22 January 2025.
