= Farmers' Alliance (Ireland) =

Irish political party

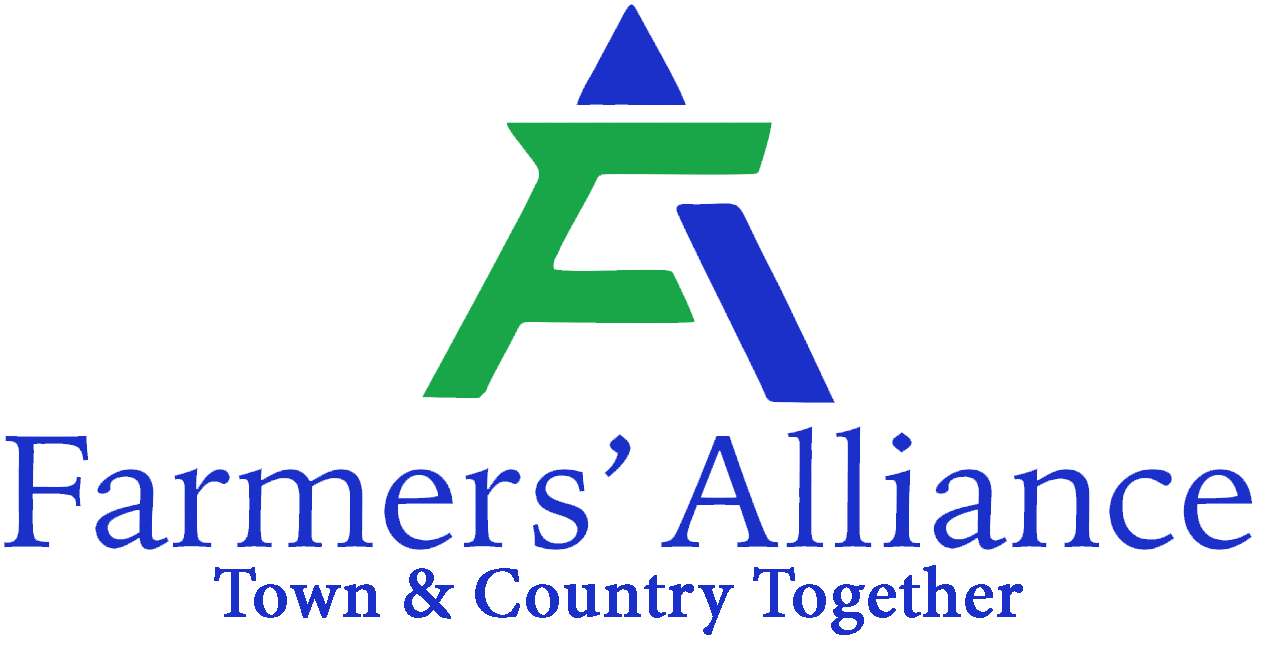
- Leader: Liam McLaughlin
- Founded: 2023
- Ideology: Agrarianism; Social conservatism; Populism; Anti-immigration; Euroscepticism
- Slogan: Town & Country Together

Website
- Official website

The Farmers' Alliance is an agrarian Irish political party established in 2023. Among its policies, it proposes a crackdown on immigration and opposition to green measures.

In April 2023, Caroline van der Plas, leader of the Dutch Farmer–Citizen Movement (BBB), addressed a meeting of the party.

In January 2024, the Electoral Commission gave notice of its intention to approve the party's registration. In February 2024, co-founder Helen O'Sullivan resigned from the party.

The party endorsed a No vote in the 2024 Irish constitutional referendums.

At the 2024 local elections, two candidates stood on behalf of the Farmers' Alliance. Neither were elected, with the party polling only 234 first-preference votes in total.
