= Cathal Crowe =

Irish politician (born 1982)

Cathal Crowe TD
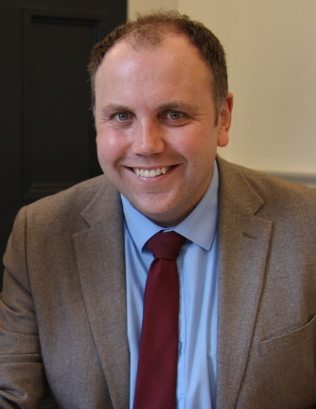
- Crowe in 2024

Teachta Dála
- Incumbent
- Assumed office February 2020
- Constituency: Clare

Personal details
- Born: 1 October 1982 (age 43) Limerick, Ireland
- Party: Fianna Fáil
- Spouse: Maeve Fehilly (m. 2013)
- Children: 3
- Education: Mary Immaculate College; University of Limerick

Cathal Crowe (born 1 October 1982) is an Irish Fianna Fáil politician who has been a Teachta Dála (TD) for the Clare constituency since the 2020 general election.

== Political career ==
Crowe was first elected to Clare County Council in 2004 at 21 years of age, making him the youngest councillor in Ireland at the time. Reflecting on this in a 2019 interview, Crowe said "I was very green when first elected. I didn't own a suit at the time, I was finishing exams at UL and drove around on a scooter. With my first pay cheque from the Council I bought a PlayStation 2. For all the experience I lacked, I had huge hunger and desire to make things better for my community and the Council".

In 2019, as the Mayor of County Clare, he gained attention as the first politician to decide to boycott the government's commemoration of the Royal Irish Constabulary. He was a member of Clare County Council for the Shannon local electoral area from 2004 to 2020.

Crowe went on to successfully contest three more elections to Clare County Council in 2009, 2014 and 2019, twice topping the poll by receiving the most first preference votes.

Crowe was first elected to Dáil Eireann, the national parliament, in the 2020 general election and was re-elected in November 2024. Crowe is the Fianna Fáil spokesperson on Aviation, Road Transport, Logistics, Rail and Ports. In April 2025, he was announced as the Cathaoirleach of the Oireachtas Committee on Education Youth.

In March 2023, the political news website the Ditch reported that Crowe had not disclosed his ownership of two homes on a planning application to Clare County Council for permission to build a house. In addition, the same article reported Crowe had falsely claimed to have lived in his parents' house until 2012, when he had in fact bought and moved into a property in 2007. When questioned by RTÉ, Crowe rejected the allegation from the Ditch that he owned two homes and defended his use of the Irish form of his name on the planning application form.

Further investigations by the Ditch revealed that Crowe had not declared EU payments in respect of farmland that he owns in County Clare, thereby breaching the rules for declaring sources of income on Dáil ethics returns.

In June 2024, he urged the Irish government to contact the Vatican about the mythical crown of Brian Boru returned to Ireland. In February 2025, the Vatican replied that it had no record of having it.

In May 2025, Crowe caused controversy when he stated that the British Army "never retaliated by bombing or shooting the civilian population of Ireland" during a Dáil debate on the war in Gaza. He later apologised for the incorrect statements.

== Personal life ==
Crowe is the son of Michael, a retired fire fighter and Irene, a retired nurse. In 2013, he married Maeve Fehilly from Charleville, County Cork. The couple have three children together.

Prior to being elected as a TD, Crowe was a primary school teacher in Parteen National School.

Dáil	Election	Deputy (Party)	Deputy (Party)	Deputy (Party)	Deputy (Party)	Deputy (Party)
2nd	1921	Éamon de Valera (SF)	Brian O'Higgins (SF)	Seán Liddy (SF)	Patrick Brennan (SF)	4 seats 1921–1923
3rd	1922	Éamon de Valera (AT-SF)	Brian O'Higgins (AT-SF)	Seán Liddy (PT-SF)	Patrick Brennan (PT-SF)	4 seats 1921–1923
4th	1923	Éamon de Valera (Rep)	Brian O'Higgins (Rep)	Conor Hogan (FP)	Patrick Hogan (Lab)	Eoin MacNeill (CnaG)
5th	1927 (Jun)	Éamon de Valera (FF)	Patrick Houlihan (FF)	Thomas Falvey (FP)	Patrick Hogan (Lab)	Patrick Kelly (CnaG)
6th	1927 (Sep)	Éamon de Valera (FF)	Patrick Houlihan (FF)	Martin Sexton (FF)	Patrick Hogan (Lab)	Patrick Kelly (CnaG)
7th	1932	Éamon de Valera (FF)	Seán O'Grady (FF)	Martin Sexton (FF)	Patrick Hogan (Lab)	Patrick Burke (CnaG)
8th	1933	Éamon de Valera (FF)	Seán O'Grady (FF)	Patrick Houlihan (FF)	Patrick Hogan (Lab)	Patrick Burke (CnaG)
9th	1937	Éamon de Valera (FF)	Seán O'Grady (FF)	Thomas Burke (FP)	Patrick Hogan (Lab)	Patrick Burke (FG)
10th	1938	Éamon de Valera (FF)	Seán O'Grady (FF)	Thomas Burke (FP)	Peter O'Loghlen (FF)	Patrick Burke (FG)
11th	1943	Éamon de Valera (FF)	Seán O'Grady (FF)	Thomas Burke (FP)	Patrick Hogan (Lab)	Patrick Burke (FG)
12th	1944	Éamon de Valera (FF)	Seán O'Grady (FF)	Thomas Burke (FP)	Peter O'Loghlen (FF)	Patrick Burke (FG)
12th	1945 by-election	Éamon de Valera (FF)	Seán O'Grady (FF)	Thomas Burke (FP)	Peter O'Loghlen (FF)	Patrick Shanahan (FF)
13th	1948	Éamon de Valera (FF)	Seán O'Grady (FF)	Thomas Burke (FP)	Patrick Hogan (Lab)	4 seats 1948–1969
14th	1951	Éamon de Valera (FF)	Patrick Hillery (FF)	William Murphy (FG)	Patrick Hogan (Lab)	4 seats 1948–1969
15th	1954	Éamon de Valera (FF)	Patrick Hillery (FF)	William Murphy (FG)	Patrick Hogan (Lab)	4 seats 1948–1969
16th	1957	Éamon de Valera (FF)	Patrick Hillery (FF)	William Murphy (FG)	Patrick Hogan (Lab)	4 seats 1948–1969
16th	1959 by-election	Seán Ó Ceallaigh (FF)	Patrick Hillery (FF)	William Murphy (FG)	Patrick Hogan (Lab)	4 seats 1948–1969
17th	1961	Seán Ó Ceallaigh (FF)	Patrick Hillery (FF)	William Murphy (FG)	Patrick Hogan (Lab)	4 seats 1948–1969
18th	1965	Seán Ó Ceallaigh (FF)	Patrick Hillery (FF)	William Murphy (FG)	Patrick Hogan (Lab)	4 seats 1948–1969
18th	1968 by-election	Seán Ó Ceallaigh (FF)	Patrick Hillery (FF)	Sylvester Barrett (FF)	Patrick Hogan (Lab)	4 seats 1948–1969
19th	1969	Frank Taylor (FG)	Patrick Hillery (FF)	Sylvester Barrett (FF)	3 seats 1969–1981	
20th	1973	Frank Taylor (FG)	Brendan Daly (FF)	Sylvester Barrett (FF)	3 seats 1969–1981	
21st	1977	Frank Taylor (FG)	Brendan Daly (FF)	Sylvester Barrett (FF)	3 seats 1969–1981	
22nd	1981	Madeleine Taylor (FG)	Brendan Daly (FF)	Sylvester Barrett (FF)	Bill Loughnane (FF)	4 seats since 1981
23rd	1982 (Feb)	Donal Carey (FG)	Brendan Daly (FF)	Sylvester Barrett (FF)	Bill Loughnane (FF)	4 seats since 1981
24th	1982 (Nov)	Donal Carey (FG)	Brendan Daly (FF)	Sylvester Barrett (FF)	Madeleine Taylor-Quinn (FG)	4 seats since 1981
25th	1987	Donal Carey (FG)	Brendan Daly (FF)	Síle de Valera (FF)	Madeleine Taylor-Quinn (FG)	4 seats since 1981
26th	1989	Donal Carey (FG)	Brendan Daly (FF)	Síle de Valera (FF)	Madeleine Taylor-Quinn (FG)	4 seats since 1981
27th	1992	Donal Carey (FG)	Moosajee Bhamjee (Lab)	Síle de Valera (FF)	Tony Killeen (FF)	4 seats since 1981
28th	1997	Donal Carey (FG)	Brendan Daly (FF)	Síle de Valera (FF)	Tony Killeen (FF)	4 seats since 1981
29th	2002	Pat Breen (FG)	James Breen (Ind.)	Síle de Valera (FF)	Tony Killeen (FF)	4 seats since 1981
30th	2007	Pat Breen (FG)	Joe Carey (FG)	Timmy Dooley (FF)	Tony Killeen (FF)	4 seats since 1981
31st	2011	Pat Breen (FG)	Joe Carey (FG)	Timmy Dooley (FF)	Michael McNamara (Lab)	4 seats since 1981
32nd	2016	Pat Breen (FG)	Joe Carey (FG)	Timmy Dooley (FF)	Michael Harty (Ind.)	4 seats since 1981
33rd	2020	Violet-Anne Wynne (SF)	Joe Carey (FG)	Cathal Crowe (FF)	Michael McNamara (Ind.)	4 seats since 1981
34th	2024	Donna McGettigan (SF)	Joe Cooney (FG)	Cathal Crowe (FF)	Timmy Dooley (FF)	4 seats since 1981
