= Joe Carey =

Irish former politician (born 1975)

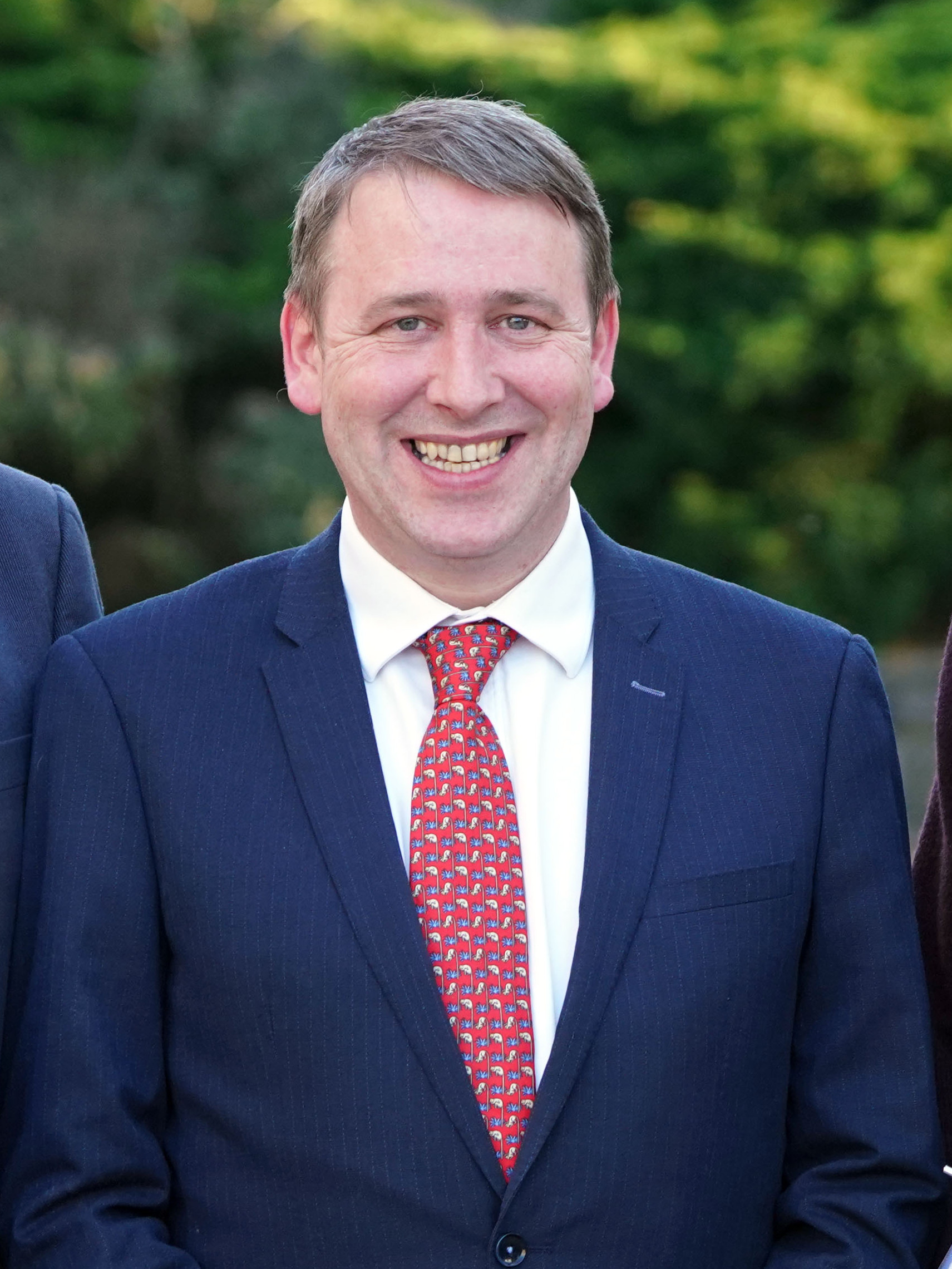
- Carey in 2019

Teachta Dála
- In office May 2007 – 27 August 2024
- Constituency: Clare

Personal details
- Born: Joseph Carey; 24 June 1975 (age 51) Limerick, Ireland
- Party: Fine Gael
- Spouse: Grace Carey (m. 2013)
- Children: 2
- Parent: Donal Carey (father)
- Education: Galway Institute of Technology
- Website: joecarey.ie

Joseph Carey (born 24 June 1975) is an Irish former Fine Gael politician who served as a Teachta Dála (TD) for the Clare constituency from the 2007 general election, until his resignation on medical grounds in August 2024.

== Early life ==
Carey is the son of Donal Carey who was a TD and Senator. He was educated at St Flannan's College, Ennis, and Galway Institute of Technology.

== Political career ==
From 1997 to 2007, Carey was a member of Clare County Council. He was elected to Dáil Éireann at the 2007 general election. He was appointed Fine Gael deputy spokesperson on Justice, with special responsibility for Juvenile Justice in October 2007. In October 2010, he was appointed as assistant Chief Whip. He was a member of the Joint Oireachtas Committee on Social Protection and the British–Irish Parliamentary Assembly, where he served on the committee for European Affairs. He has previously served as a member of the Dáil Committee on Procedures and Privileges and Fine Gael spokesperson on Juvenile Justice and deputy Government Chief Whip.

In March 2023, Carey was hospitalised with breathing difficulties and began treatment for cardiac issues. The Oireachtas granted him sick leave and continued to pay his salary and allowances. In the December 2023 vote of confidence in minister Helen McEntee, Carey was paired with Neasa Hourigan. In April 2024 the Cork Examiner reported that his resignation on grounds of illness would be delayed until the autumn in order to preclude the need for a Dáil by-election to be held shortly before the imminent general election. Carey resigned on 27 August 2024, the seat remaining vacant until the dissolution of the 33rd Dáil on 8 November 2024.

== See also ==
- Families in the Oireachtas

| Dáil | Election | Deputy (Party) | Deputy (Party) | Deputy (Party) | Deputy (Party) | Deputy (Party) |
|---|---|---|---|---|---|---|
| 2nd | 1921 | Éamon de Valera (SF) | Brian O'Higgins (SF) | Seán Liddy (SF) | Patrick Brennan (SF) | 4 seats 1921–1923 |
| 3rd | 1922 | Éamon de Valera (AT-SF) | Brian O'Higgins (AT-SF) | Seán Liddy (PT-SF) | Patrick Brennan (PT-SF) | 4 seats 1921–1923 |
| 4th | 1923 | Éamon de Valera (Rep) | Brian O'Higgins (Rep) | Conor Hogan (FP) | Patrick Hogan (Lab) | Eoin MacNeill (CnaG) |
| 5th | 1927 (Jun) | Éamon de Valera (FF) | Patrick Houlihan (FF) | Thomas Falvey (FP) | Patrick Hogan (Lab) | Patrick Kelly (CnaG) |
| 6th | 1927 (Sep) | Éamon de Valera (FF) | Patrick Houlihan (FF) | Martin Sexton (FF) | Patrick Hogan (Lab) | Patrick Kelly (CnaG) |
| 7th | 1932 | Éamon de Valera (FF) | Seán O'Grady (FF) | Martin Sexton (FF) | Patrick Hogan (Lab) | Patrick Burke (CnaG) |
| 8th | 1933 | Éamon de Valera (FF) | Seán O'Grady (FF) | Patrick Houlihan (FF) | Patrick Hogan (Lab) | Patrick Burke (CnaG) |
| 9th | 1937 | Éamon de Valera (FF) | Seán O'Grady (FF) | Thomas Burke (FP) | Patrick Hogan (Lab) | Patrick Burke (FG) |
| 10th | 1938 | Éamon de Valera (FF) | Seán O'Grady (FF) | Thomas Burke (FP) | Peter O'Loghlen (FF) | Patrick Burke (FG) |
| 11th | 1943 | Éamon de Valera (FF) | Seán O'Grady (FF) | Thomas Burke (FP) | Patrick Hogan (Lab) | Patrick Burke (FG) |
| 12th | 1944 | Éamon de Valera (FF) | Seán O'Grady (FF) | Thomas Burke (FP) | Peter O'Loghlen (FF) | Patrick Burke (FG) |
| 12th | 1945 by-election | Éamon de Valera (FF) | Seán O'Grady (FF) | Thomas Burke (FP) | Peter O'Loghlen (FF) | Patrick Shanahan (FF) |
| 13th | 1948 | Éamon de Valera (FF) | Seán O'Grady (FF) | Thomas Burke (FP) | Patrick Hogan (Lab) | 4 seats 1948–1969 |
| 14th | 1951 | Éamon de Valera (FF) | Patrick Hillery (FF) | William Murphy (FG) | Patrick Hogan (Lab) | 4 seats 1948–1969 |
| 15th | 1954 | Éamon de Valera (FF) | Patrick Hillery (FF) | William Murphy (FG) | Patrick Hogan (Lab) | 4 seats 1948–1969 |
| 16th | 1957 | Éamon de Valera (FF) | Patrick Hillery (FF) | William Murphy (FG) | Patrick Hogan (Lab) | 4 seats 1948–1969 |
| 16th | 1959 by-election | Seán Ó Ceallaigh (FF) | Patrick Hillery (FF) | William Murphy (FG) | Patrick Hogan (Lab) | 4 seats 1948–1969 |
| 17th | 1961 | Seán Ó Ceallaigh (FF) | Patrick Hillery (FF) | William Murphy (FG) | Patrick Hogan (Lab) | 4 seats 1948–1969 |
| 18th | 1965 | Seán Ó Ceallaigh (FF) | Patrick Hillery (FF) | William Murphy (FG) | Patrick Hogan (Lab) | 4 seats 1948–1969 |
| 18th | 1968 by-election | Seán Ó Ceallaigh (FF) | Patrick Hillery (FF) | Sylvester Barrett (FF) | Patrick Hogan (Lab) | 4 seats 1948–1969 |
| 19th | 1969 | Frank Taylor (FG) | Patrick Hillery (FF) | Sylvester Barrett (FF) | 3 seats 1969–1981 | |
| 20th | 1973 | Frank Taylor (FG) | Brendan Daly (FF) | Sylvester Barrett (FF) | 3 seats 1969–1981 | |
| 21st | 1977 | Frank Taylor (FG) | Brendan Daly (FF) | Sylvester Barrett (FF) | 3 seats 1969–1981 | |
| 22nd | 1981 | Madeleine Taylor (FG) | Brendan Daly (FF) | Sylvester Barrett (FF) | Bill Loughnane (FF) | 4 seats since 1981 |
| 23rd | 1982 (Feb) | Donal Carey (FG) | Brendan Daly (FF) | Sylvester Barrett (FF) | Bill Loughnane (FF) | 4 seats since 1981 |
| 24th | 1982 (Nov) | Donal Carey (FG) | Brendan Daly (FF) | Sylvester Barrett (FF) | Madeleine Taylor-Quinn (FG) | 4 seats since 1981 |
| 25th | 1987 | Donal Carey (FG) | Brendan Daly (FF) | Síle de Valera (FF) | Madeleine Taylor-Quinn (FG) | 4 seats since 1981 |
| 26th | 1989 | Donal Carey (FG) | Brendan Daly (FF) | Síle de Valera (FF) | Madeleine Taylor-Quinn (FG) | 4 seats since 1981 |
| 27th | 1992 | Donal Carey (FG) | Moosajee Bhamjee (Lab) | Síle de Valera (FF) | Tony Killeen (FF) | 4 seats since 1981 |
| 28th | 1997 | Donal Carey (FG) | Brendan Daly (FF) | Síle de Valera (FF) | Tony Killeen (FF) | 4 seats since 1981 |
| 29th | 2002 | Pat Breen (FG) | James Breen (Ind.) | Síle de Valera (FF) | Tony Killeen (FF) | 4 seats since 1981 |
| 30th | 2007 | Pat Breen (FG) | Joe Carey (FG) | Timmy Dooley (FF) | Tony Killeen (FF) | 4 seats since 1981 |
| 31st | 2011 | Pat Breen (FG) | Joe Carey (FG) | Timmy Dooley (FF) | Michael McNamara (Lab) | 4 seats since 1981 |
| 32nd | 2016 | Pat Breen (FG) | Joe Carey (FG) | Timmy Dooley (FF) | Michael Harty (Ind.) | 4 seats since 1981 |
| 33rd | 2020 | Violet-Anne Wynne (SF) | Joe Carey (FG) | Cathal Crowe (FF) | Michael McNamara (Ind.) | 4 seats since 1981 |
| 34th | 2024 | Donna McGettigan (SF) | Joe Cooney (FG) | Cathal Crowe (FF) | Timmy Dooley (FF) | 4 seats since 1981 |
