= Tony Mulcahy =

Irish politician (born 1959)

Cllr Tony Mulcahy

Clare County Councillor
- Incumbent
- Assumed office June 2024
- In office 1999–2011
- Constituency: Shannon

Senator
- In office 25 May 2011 – 8 June 2016
- Constituency: Labour Panel

Personal details
- Born: 12 April 1959 (age 66) Limerick, Ireland
- Party: Fine Gael

Tony Mulcahy (born 12 April 1959) is an Irish Fine Gael politician. He is a member of Clare County Council since 2024, and previously from 1999 to 2011. He was a member of Shannon Town Council from 1999 to 2011, representing the Shannon electoral area. He was a member of Seanad Éireann for the Labour Panel from May 2011 to June 2016. He was an unsuccessful candidate for the Clare constituency at the 2007 and 2011 general elections.

He was the Fine Gael Seanad spokesperson on Communications, Energy and Natural Resources.

He lost his seat in the 2016 Seanad election. He was again elected to Clare County Council at the 2024 local elections. He contested the 2025 Seanad election but was not elected.
