= Clare County Council =

Local authority for County Clare, Ireland

Clare County Council Comhairle Contae an Chláir
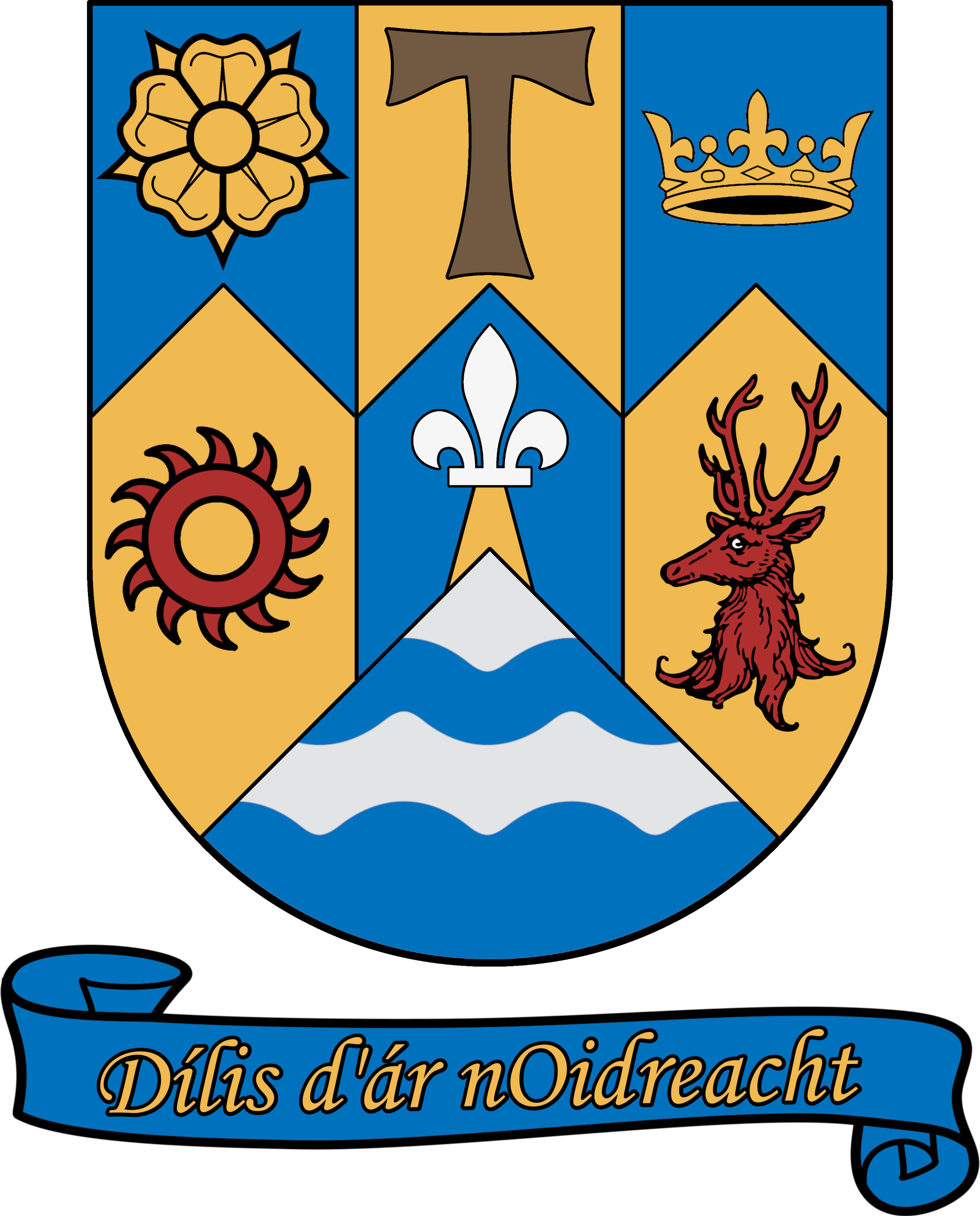

Type
- Type: County council

History
- Founded: 1 April 1899

Leadership
- Cathaoirleach: Joe Killeen, FF

Structure
- Seats: 28
- Political groups: Fianna Fáil (14) Fine Gael (9) Sinn Féin (2) Independent (3)

Elections
- Last election: 7 June 2024

Motto
- Dílis d'ar nOidreacht (Irish) "True to our Heritage"

Meeting place
- Áras Contae an Chláir, Ennis

Website
- Official website

The area governed by the council

Clare County Council (Irish: Comhairle Contae an Chláir) is the local authority of County Clare, Ireland. As a county council, it is governed by the Local Government Act 2001. The council is responsible for housing and community, roads and transportation, urban planning and development, amenity and culture, and environment. The council has 28 elected members who are elected for a five-year term. The head of the council has the title of Cathaoirleach (chairperson). The county administration is headed by a chief executive, Pat Dowling. The county town is Ennis.

== History ==
Clare County Council was established on 1 April 1899 under the Local Government (Ireland) Act 1898 for the administrative county of County Clare, succeeding in area of the former judicial county of Clare, with the addition of the district electoral divisions of Drummaan, Inishcaltra North, and Mountshannon, formerly within the judicial county of County Galway.

Before 1925, the chair of each rural district council sat as an ex officio member of the council. Under the Local Government Act 1925, rural district councils in Ireland were abolished and their functions transferred to the county councils. In County Clare, these were the districts of Ballyvagh, Corrofin, Ennis, Ennistimon, Killadysert, Kilrush, Meelick, Scarriff, and Tulla.

Originally meetings of Clare County Council were held at Ennis Courthouse. Áras Contae an Chláir, a new county council headquarters, was completed in May 2008.

== Regional Assembly ==
Clare County Council has two representatives on the Southern Regional Assembly who are part of the Mid-West Strategic Planning Area Committee.

== Elections ==
Members of Clare County Council are elected for a five-year term of office on the electoral system of proportional representation by means of the single transferable vote (PR-STV) from multi-member local electoral areas.

Year	FF	FG	SF	GP	Lab	PDs	Ind.	Total
2024	14	9	2	0	0	—N/a	3	28
2019	13	8	1	1	0	—N/a	5	28
2014	12	8	1	0	0	—N/a	7	28
2009	11	12	0	1	1	—N/a	7	32
2004	15	10	0	1	1	0	5	32
1999	18	9	0	0	0	1	4	32
1991	17	8	0	0	1	1	5	32
1985	17	8	0	0	2	—N/a	5	32
1979	17	9	1	—N/a	2	—N/a	2	31

=== Local electoral areas and municipal districts ===
County Clare is divided into the following local electoral areas and municipal districts, defined by electoral divisions.

Municipal District	LEA	Definition	Seats
Ennis		Clareabbey, Doora, Ennis No. 1 Urban, Ennis No. 2 Urban, Ennis No. 3 Urban, Ennis No. 4 Urban, Ennis Rural, Kilnamona, Kilraghtis, Spancelhill and Templemaley	7
Killaloe		Ayle, Ballyblood, Ballynahinch, Boherglass, Caher, Caherhurly, Cahermurphy (in the former Rural District of Scarriff), Cappaghabaun, Carrowbaun, Castlecrine, Cloghera, Clooney (in the former Rural District of Tulla), Cloontra, Cloonusker, Coolreagh, Corlea, Crusheen, Dangan, Derrynagittagh, Drummaan, Fahymore, Feakle, Glendree, Inishcaltra North, Inishcaltra South, Kilkishen, Killaloe, Killanena, Killokennedy, Killuran, Kilseily, Kiltannon, Kyle, Lackareagh, Loughea, Mountshannon, Newgrove, OBriensbridge, Ogonnelloe, Quin, Rathclooney, Rossroe, Scarriff, Toberbreeda, Tomfinlough and Tulla	5
Shannon		Ballycannan, Ballyglass, Cappavilla, Clenagh, Cratloe, Drumline, Killeely, Kiltenanlea, Mountievers, Newmarket, Sixmilebridge and Urlan	7
West Clare	Ennistymon	Abbey, Ballagh, Ballyea, Ballyeighter, Ballysteen, Ballyvaskin, Boston, Carran, Castletown, Cloghaun, Cloonanaha, Clooney (in the former Rural District of Ennistimon), Corrofin, Derreen, Drumcreehy, Dysert, Ennistimon, Gleninagh, Glenroe, Kilfenora, Killaspuglonane, Killilagh, Killinaboy, Kilshanny, Kiltoraght, Liscannor, Lisdoonvarna, Lurraga, Magherareagh, Milltown Malbay, Mount Elva, Moy, Muckanagh, Noughaval, Oughtmama, Rath, Rathborney, Ruan and Smithstown	4
West Clare	Kilrush	Annagh, Ballynacally, Cahermurphy (in the former Rural District of Kilrush), Clondagad, Cloonadrum, Clooncoorha, Coolmeen, Cooraclare, Creegh, Doonbeg, Drumellihy, Einagh, Formoyle, Furroor, Glenmore, Kilballyowen, Kilchreest, Kilcloher, Kilfearagh, Kilfiddane, Kilkee, Killadysert, Killanniv, Killard, Killimer, Killofin, Killone, Kilmihil, Kilmurry (in the former Rural District of Killadysert), Kilmurry (in the former Rural District of Kilrush), Kilrush Rural, Kilrush Urban, Kinturk, Knock, Knocknaboley, Knocknagore, Liscasey, Lisheen, Moveen, Moyarta, Mullagh, Querrin, Rahona, Rinealon, St. Martins, Tullig and Tullycreen	5

== Councillors ==
The following were elected at the 2024 Clare County Council election.

Party	Seats
Fianna Fáil	14
Fine Gael	9
Sinn Féin	2
Independent	3

=== Councillors by electoral area ===
This list reflects the order in which councillors were elected on 7 June 2024.

Council members from 2024 election
Local electoral area	Name	Party
Ennis	Pat Daly	Fianna Fáil
Ennis	Mary Howard	Fine Gael
Ennis	Paul Murphy	Fine Gael
Ennis	Clare Colleran Molloy	Fianna Fáil
Ennis	Tommy Guilfoyle	Sinn Féin
Ennis	Antoinette Baker Bashua	Fianna Fáil
Ennis	Tom O'Callaghan	Fianna Fáil
Ennistymon	Bill Slattery	Fine Gael
Ennistymon	Joe Garrihy	Fine Gael
Ennistymon	Shane Talty	Fianna Fáil
Ennistymon	Joe Killeen	Fianna Fáil
Killaloe	Joe Cooney (Note: Replaced during term, see table below for details.)	Fine Gael
Killaloe	Pat Hayes	Fianna Fáil
Killaloe	Alan O'Callaghan	Fianna Fáil
Killaloe	Tony O'Brien	Fianna Fáil
Killaloe	Pat Burke	Fine Gael
Kilrush	Dinny Gould	Independent
Kilrush	Rita McInerney	Fianna Fáil
Kilrush	Ian Lynch	Independent
Kilrush	Michael Shannon	Fianna Fáil
Kilrush	Gabriel Keating	Fine Gael
Shannon	David Griffin	Fianna Fáil
Shannon	Donna McGettigan	Sinn Féin
Shannon	John Crowe	Fine Gael
Shannon	Rachel Hartigan	Fianna Fáil
Shannon	Pat O'Gorman	Fianna Fáil
Shannon	Tony Mulcahy	Fine Gael
Shannon	Michael Begley	Independent

==== Co-options ====
Party	Outgoing	LEA	Reason	Date	Co-optee
Sinn Féin	Donna McGettigan	Shannon	Elected to 34th Dáil at the 2024 general election	10 December 2024	James Ryan
Fine Gael	Joe Cooney	Killaloe	Elected to 34th Dáil at the 2024 general election	19 December 2024	Conor Ryan
