= 1945 Clare by-election =

By-election to the 12th Dáil

- 4 December 1945
- Turnout: 29,825 (48.9%)
	Shanahan	Monahan
Nominee	Patrick Shanahan	Edward Monahan
Party	Fianna Fáil	Fine Gael
First preferences	21,526	8,299
Percentage	72.2%	27.8%
TD before election
Patrick Burke
Fine Gael
TD after election
Patrick Shanahan
Fianna Fáil

A Dáil by-election was held in the constituency of Clare in Ireland on Tuesday, 4 December 1945, to fill a vacancy in the 12th Dáil. It followed the death of Fine Gael TD Patrick Burke on 7 February 1945 in the precincts of Leinster House.

In 1945, Clare was a five seat constituency comprising County Clare and several electoral divisions in County Galway.

The writ of election to fill the vacancy was agreed by the Dáil on 14 November 1945.

The by-election was won by the Fianna Fáil candidate Patrick Shanahan.

Four other by-elections were held on the same day: in Dublin North-West, Kerry South, Mayo South and Wexford. Three by-elections were won by Fianna Fáil, one by Clann na Talmhan, and one by Labour.

Shanahan lost his seat at the 1948 general election, and was never subsequently re-elected to the Dáil.

== Result ==
1945 Clare by-election
Party	Candidate	FPv%	Count
Party	Candidate	FPv%	1
Fianna Fáil	Patrick Shanahan	72.2	21,526
Fine Gael	Edward Monahan	27.8	8,299
Electorate: 60,993 Valid: 29,825 Quota: 14,913 Turnout: 48.9%
