= Peter O'Loghlen =

Peter O'Loghlen may refer to:

- Peter O'Loghlen (Australian politician) (1882–1923), Australian politician
- Peter O'Loghlen (Irish politician) (1883–1971), Irish Fianna Fáil politician
