= Michael Harty =

Michael Harty may refer to:

- Michael Harty (bishop), Irish former Roman Catholic prelate and former Bishop of Killaloe
- Michael Harty (politician), Irish former Independent Teachta Dála for Clare
