= Peadar O'Loghlen =

Peadar O'Loghlen may refer to

- Peter O'Loghlen (1883–1971) Irish politician
- Peadar O'Loughlin Irish musician
