= Seán Liddy =

Irish politician (1890–1965)

Teachta Dála
- In office May 1921 – 18 December 1922
- Constituency: Clare

Personal details
- Born: John Joseph Liddy; 20 September 1890 County Clare, Ireland
- Died: 30 March 1965 (aged 74) Dublin, Ireland
- Party: Sinn Féin
- Spouse: Anna Breen (m. 1922)

Military intelligence file for John Liddy

Seán Joseph Liddy (John Joseph Liddy; 20 September 1890 – 30 March 1965) was an Irish politician and founder member of the Garda Síochána. On his retirement, he also founded and became the first President of the Garda Pensioners Association (1961–1966), later to be renamed the Garda Síochána Retired Members Association (GSRMA).

One of seven children, Liddy was born as John Liddy in Danganelly, Cooraclare in County Clare on 20 September 1890, the son of farmer John Liddy and Margaret Donnellan. He was married in Dublin on 27 September 1922 to Anna Breen.

Alongside lifelong friend Michael Collins, he was a prominent veteran of the Irish War of Independence. Subsequently, he served as a Teachta Dála (TD), Army Officer and Garda Chief Superintendent.

At the 1921 elections, he was elected unopposed to the Second Dáil as a Sinn Féin TD for the constituency of Clare. He supported the Anglo-Irish Treaty and voted in favour of it.

On 21 October 1921, Liddy was court-martialed at the A.O.H Hall in Kilrush having been accused of converting £26,000 (£1,079,847 in 2025) of Clare County Council monies to his own use, however the outcome of this case is unknown.

He was re-elected unopposed as a pro-Treaty Sinn Féin TD at the 1922 general election. He resigned as a TD on 18 December 1922.

He died as a result of a motor accident on 30 March 1965.

The Liddy Medal – the Garda Veterans Injury Award – is named in his memory. The medal is presented to retired Gardaí who were injured in the line of duty while in the force.

Dáil	Election	Deputy (Party)	Deputy (Party)	Deputy (Party)	Deputy (Party)	Deputy (Party)
2nd	1921	Éamon de Valera (SF)	Brian O'Higgins (SF)	Seán Liddy (SF)	Patrick Brennan (SF)	4 seats 1921–1923
3rd	1922	Éamon de Valera (AT-SF)	Brian O'Higgins (AT-SF)	Seán Liddy (PT-SF)	Patrick Brennan (PT-SF)	4 seats 1921–1923
4th	1923	Éamon de Valera (Rep)	Brian O'Higgins (Rep)	Conor Hogan (FP)	Patrick Hogan (Lab)	Eoin MacNeill (CnaG)
5th	1927 (Jun)	Éamon de Valera (FF)	Patrick Houlihan (FF)	Thomas Falvey (FP)	Patrick Hogan (Lab)	Patrick Kelly (CnaG)
6th	1927 (Sep)	Éamon de Valera (FF)	Patrick Houlihan (FF)	Martin Sexton (FF)	Patrick Hogan (Lab)	Patrick Kelly (CnaG)
7th	1932	Éamon de Valera (FF)	Seán O'Grady (FF)	Martin Sexton (FF)	Patrick Hogan (Lab)	Patrick Burke (CnaG)
8th	1933	Éamon de Valera (FF)	Seán O'Grady (FF)	Patrick Houlihan (FF)	Patrick Hogan (Lab)	Patrick Burke (CnaG)
9th	1937	Éamon de Valera (FF)	Seán O'Grady (FF)	Thomas Burke (FP)	Patrick Hogan (Lab)	Patrick Burke (FG)
10th	1938	Éamon de Valera (FF)	Seán O'Grady (FF)	Thomas Burke (FP)	Peter O'Loghlen (FF)	Patrick Burke (FG)
11th	1943	Éamon de Valera (FF)	Seán O'Grady (FF)	Thomas Burke (FP)	Patrick Hogan (Lab)	Patrick Burke (FG)
12th	1944	Éamon de Valera (FF)	Seán O'Grady (FF)	Thomas Burke (FP)	Peter O'Loghlen (FF)	Patrick Burke (FG)
12th	1945 by-election	Éamon de Valera (FF)	Seán O'Grady (FF)	Thomas Burke (FP)	Peter O'Loghlen (FF)	Patrick Shanahan (FF)
13th	1948	Éamon de Valera (FF)	Seán O'Grady (FF)	Thomas Burke (FP)	Patrick Hogan (Lab)	4 seats 1948–1969
14th	1951	Éamon de Valera (FF)	Patrick Hillery (FF)	William Murphy (FG)	Patrick Hogan (Lab)	4 seats 1948–1969
15th	1954	Éamon de Valera (FF)	Patrick Hillery (FF)	William Murphy (FG)	Patrick Hogan (Lab)	4 seats 1948–1969
16th	1957	Éamon de Valera (FF)	Patrick Hillery (FF)	William Murphy (FG)	Patrick Hogan (Lab)	4 seats 1948–1969
16th	1959 by-election	Seán Ó Ceallaigh (FF)	Patrick Hillery (FF)	William Murphy (FG)	Patrick Hogan (Lab)	4 seats 1948–1969
17th	1961	Seán Ó Ceallaigh (FF)	Patrick Hillery (FF)	William Murphy (FG)	Patrick Hogan (Lab)	4 seats 1948–1969
18th	1965	Seán Ó Ceallaigh (FF)	Patrick Hillery (FF)	William Murphy (FG)	Patrick Hogan (Lab)	4 seats 1948–1969
18th	1968 by-election	Seán Ó Ceallaigh (FF)	Patrick Hillery (FF)	Sylvester Barrett (FF)	Patrick Hogan (Lab)	4 seats 1948–1969
19th	1969	Frank Taylor (FG)	Patrick Hillery (FF)	Sylvester Barrett (FF)	3 seats 1969–1981	
20th	1973	Frank Taylor (FG)	Brendan Daly (FF)	Sylvester Barrett (FF)	3 seats 1969–1981	
21st	1977	Frank Taylor (FG)	Brendan Daly (FF)	Sylvester Barrett (FF)	3 seats 1969–1981	
22nd	1981	Madeleine Taylor (FG)	Brendan Daly (FF)	Sylvester Barrett (FF)	Bill Loughnane (FF)	4 seats since 1981
23rd	1982 (Feb)	Donal Carey (FG)	Brendan Daly (FF)	Sylvester Barrett (FF)	Bill Loughnane (FF)	4 seats since 1981
24th	1982 (Nov)	Donal Carey (FG)	Brendan Daly (FF)	Sylvester Barrett (FF)	Madeleine Taylor-Quinn (FG)	4 seats since 1981
25th	1987	Donal Carey (FG)	Brendan Daly (FF)	Síle de Valera (FF)	Madeleine Taylor-Quinn (FG)	4 seats since 1981
26th	1989	Donal Carey (FG)	Brendan Daly (FF)	Síle de Valera (FF)	Madeleine Taylor-Quinn (FG)	4 seats since 1981
27th	1992	Donal Carey (FG)	Moosajee Bhamjee (Lab)	Síle de Valera (FF)	Tony Killeen (FF)	4 seats since 1981
28th	1997	Donal Carey (FG)	Brendan Daly (FF)	Síle de Valera (FF)	Tony Killeen (FF)	4 seats since 1981
29th	2002	Pat Breen (FG)	James Breen (Ind.)	Síle de Valera (FF)	Tony Killeen (FF)	4 seats since 1981
30th	2007	Pat Breen (FG)	Joe Carey (FG)	Timmy Dooley (FF)	Tony Killeen (FF)	4 seats since 1981
31st	2011	Pat Breen (FG)	Joe Carey (FG)	Timmy Dooley (FF)	Michael McNamara (Lab)	4 seats since 1981
32nd	2016	Pat Breen (FG)	Joe Carey (FG)	Timmy Dooley (FF)	Michael Harty (Ind.)	4 seats since 1981
33rd	2020	Violet-Anne Wynne (SF)	Joe Carey (FG)	Cathal Crowe (FF)	Michael McNamara (Ind.)	4 seats since 1981
34th	2024	Donna McGettigan (SF)	Joe Cooney (FG)	Cathal Crowe (FF)	Timmy Dooley (FF)	4 seats since 1981
