= Thomas Burke (Clare politician) =

Irish politician (1876–1951)

Teachta Dála
- In office July 1937 – May 1951
- Constituency: Clare

Personal details
- Born: 1876 Milltown Malbay, County Clare, Ireland
- Died: 20 November 1951 (aged 74–75) County Clare, Ireland
- Party: Independent
- Spouse: Margaret Burke
- Children: 11

Thomas T. Burke (1876 – 20 November 1951) was an Irish Independent politician.

He was born in Dunsallagh, Milltown Malbay, County Clare, son of Thomas Burke, a farmer, and his wife Mary (née Burke). From age 16 he developed a wide reputation throughout County Clare and beyond for his putative skills as a bonesetter, travelling long distances to attend patients, and treating a constant stream of sufferers at his farmhouse in Dunsallagh East, where he lived and worked all his life. Though he was deeply revered by many, opinion regarding the efficacy of his treatments varied sharply. In a nationally renowned case in 1912, he was acquitted by jury of a charge of manslaughter, arising from the death by gangrene of a man whose injured leg he had set and bound; an autopsy determined that the limb had not been broken.

From 1906 to 1920 he was sometime member of both Ennistymon Rural District Council and Milltown Malbay Council. He served on Clare County Council from 1925 to 195). His political affiliations were changeable: through the 1920s he belonged variously to the Labour Party, Sinn Féin, and Fianna Fáil. Failing to secure a Fianna Fáil nomination to contest the 1932 general election, he left the party and continued as an independent. Proposed as general election candidate at the 1937 nominating convention of the newly organised Clare Farmers' Party, he was summoned to the convention hall in Ennis. After announcing his support for the party manifesto, he accepted the nomination, pausing to set a delegate's dislocated ankle before hastening back to attend patients elsewhere in the town. Receiving 6,333 first-preference votes, second among ten candidates behind only Éamon de Valera.

He was elected to Dáil Éireann as an independent Teachta Dála (TD) at the 1937 general election for the Clare constituency. He was re-elected on four occasions and served until he was defeated at the 1951 general election. In 1951, his tally reduced to 4,031 first preferences, he was defeated by 107 votes for the last seat by Fianna Fáil's Patrick Hillery.

Projecting himself and his party (which organised fifty branches throughout the county) as 'non-political' – he described the farmer's three enemies as the weather, the markets, and politicians – he retained the seat in the 1938 general election with a slight increase in first preferences. When the Clare Farmers' Party was subsumed into the new national farmers' party, Clann na Talmhan, Burke, pleading the support of a wife and large family, and his willingness to assume his own election deposit and expenses, declined to comply with the Clann's £10-per-week levy on Dáil salaries, and was dropped as their candidate in February 1943. He retained his seat as an independent in the subsequent 1943 general election, in which none of the constituency's three Clann na Talmhan candidates was returned.

His attendance in the Dáil and at political meetings generally was notoriously poor; through fourteen years as a TD he spoke in the chamber five times, never after 1939. He regarded his TDs salary as deserved recompense for long years of therapeutic labours, for which 'his fee was a handshake'. Consistent with the traditions of the bonesetter's craft, he never demanded direct payment.

Burke had at least five sons and six daughters by two marriages; his second wife, Margaret, survived him. He died 20 November 1951.

Dáil	Election	Deputy (Party)	Deputy (Party)	Deputy (Party)	Deputy (Party)	Deputy (Party)
2nd	1921	Éamon de Valera (SF)	Brian O'Higgins (SF)	Seán Liddy (SF)	Patrick Brennan (SF)	4 seats 1921–1923
3rd	1922	Éamon de Valera (AT-SF)	Brian O'Higgins (AT-SF)	Seán Liddy (PT-SF)	Patrick Brennan (PT-SF)	4 seats 1921–1923
4th	1923	Éamon de Valera (Rep)	Brian O'Higgins (Rep)	Conor Hogan (FP)	Patrick Hogan (Lab)	Eoin MacNeill (CnaG)
5th	1927 (Jun)	Éamon de Valera (FF)	Patrick Houlihan (FF)	Thomas Falvey (FP)	Patrick Hogan (Lab)	Patrick Kelly (CnaG)
6th	1927 (Sep)	Éamon de Valera (FF)	Patrick Houlihan (FF)	Martin Sexton (FF)	Patrick Hogan (Lab)	Patrick Kelly (CnaG)
7th	1932	Éamon de Valera (FF)	Seán O'Grady (FF)	Martin Sexton (FF)	Patrick Hogan (Lab)	Patrick Burke (CnaG)
8th	1933	Éamon de Valera (FF)	Seán O'Grady (FF)	Patrick Houlihan (FF)	Patrick Hogan (Lab)	Patrick Burke (CnaG)
9th	1937	Éamon de Valera (FF)	Seán O'Grady (FF)	Thomas Burke (FP)	Patrick Hogan (Lab)	Patrick Burke (FG)
10th	1938	Éamon de Valera (FF)	Seán O'Grady (FF)	Thomas Burke (FP)	Peter O'Loghlen (FF)	Patrick Burke (FG)
11th	1943	Éamon de Valera (FF)	Seán O'Grady (FF)	Thomas Burke (FP)	Patrick Hogan (Lab)	Patrick Burke (FG)
12th	1944	Éamon de Valera (FF)	Seán O'Grady (FF)	Thomas Burke (FP)	Peter O'Loghlen (FF)	Patrick Burke (FG)
12th	1945 by-election	Éamon de Valera (FF)	Seán O'Grady (FF)	Thomas Burke (FP)	Peter O'Loghlen (FF)	Patrick Shanahan (FF)
13th	1948	Éamon de Valera (FF)	Seán O'Grady (FF)	Thomas Burke (FP)	Patrick Hogan (Lab)	4 seats 1948–1969
14th	1951	Éamon de Valera (FF)	Patrick Hillery (FF)	William Murphy (FG)	Patrick Hogan (Lab)	4 seats 1948–1969
15th	1954	Éamon de Valera (FF)	Patrick Hillery (FF)	William Murphy (FG)	Patrick Hogan (Lab)	4 seats 1948–1969
16th	1957	Éamon de Valera (FF)	Patrick Hillery (FF)	William Murphy (FG)	Patrick Hogan (Lab)	4 seats 1948–1969
16th	1959 by-election	Seán Ó Ceallaigh (FF)	Patrick Hillery (FF)	William Murphy (FG)	Patrick Hogan (Lab)	4 seats 1948–1969
17th	1961	Seán Ó Ceallaigh (FF)	Patrick Hillery (FF)	William Murphy (FG)	Patrick Hogan (Lab)	4 seats 1948–1969
18th	1965	Seán Ó Ceallaigh (FF)	Patrick Hillery (FF)	William Murphy (FG)	Patrick Hogan (Lab)	4 seats 1948–1969
18th	1968 by-election	Seán Ó Ceallaigh (FF)	Patrick Hillery (FF)	Sylvester Barrett (FF)	Patrick Hogan (Lab)	4 seats 1948–1969
19th	1969	Frank Taylor (FG)	Patrick Hillery (FF)	Sylvester Barrett (FF)	3 seats 1969–1981	
20th	1973	Frank Taylor (FG)	Brendan Daly (FF)	Sylvester Barrett (FF)	3 seats 1969–1981	
21st	1977	Frank Taylor (FG)	Brendan Daly (FF)	Sylvester Barrett (FF)	3 seats 1969–1981	
22nd	1981	Madeleine Taylor (FG)	Brendan Daly (FF)	Sylvester Barrett (FF)	Bill Loughnane (FF)	4 seats since 1981
23rd	1982 (Feb)	Donal Carey (FG)	Brendan Daly (FF)	Sylvester Barrett (FF)	Bill Loughnane (FF)	4 seats since 1981
24th	1982 (Nov)	Donal Carey (FG)	Brendan Daly (FF)	Sylvester Barrett (FF)	Madeleine Taylor-Quinn (FG)	4 seats since 1981
25th	1987	Donal Carey (FG)	Brendan Daly (FF)	Síle de Valera (FF)	Madeleine Taylor-Quinn (FG)	4 seats since 1981
26th	1989	Donal Carey (FG)	Brendan Daly (FF)	Síle de Valera (FF)	Madeleine Taylor-Quinn (FG)	4 seats since 1981
27th	1992	Donal Carey (FG)	Moosajee Bhamjee (Lab)	Síle de Valera (FF)	Tony Killeen (FF)	4 seats since 1981
28th	1997	Donal Carey (FG)	Brendan Daly (FF)	Síle de Valera (FF)	Tony Killeen (FF)	4 seats since 1981
29th	2002	Pat Breen (FG)	James Breen (Ind.)	Síle de Valera (FF)	Tony Killeen (FF)	4 seats since 1981
30th	2007	Pat Breen (FG)	Joe Carey (FG)	Timmy Dooley (FF)	Tony Killeen (FF)	4 seats since 1981
31st	2011	Pat Breen (FG)	Joe Carey (FG)	Timmy Dooley (FF)	Michael McNamara (Lab)	4 seats since 1981
32nd	2016	Pat Breen (FG)	Joe Carey (FG)	Timmy Dooley (FF)	Michael Harty (Ind.)	4 seats since 1981
33rd	2020	Violet-Anne Wynne (SF)	Joe Carey (FG)	Cathal Crowe (FF)	Michael McNamara (Ind.)	4 seats since 1981
34th	2024	Donna McGettigan (SF)	Joe Cooney (FG)	Cathal Crowe (FF)	Timmy Dooley (FF)	4 seats since 1981
