= Patrick Kelly (Irish politician) =

Irish soldier and politician (1875–1934)

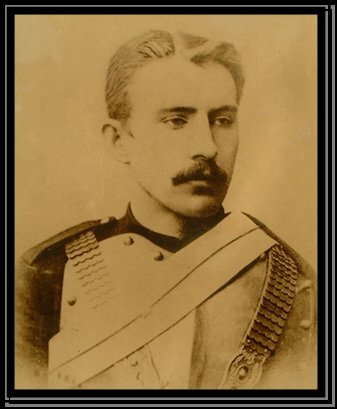
- Kelly in 1900

Teachta Dála
- In office June 1927 – February 1932
- Constituency: Clare

Personal details
- Born: 10 August 1875 Clonina, County Clare, Ireland
- Died: 20 November 1934 (aged 59) Clonina, County Clare, Ireland
- Party: Cumann na nGaedheal
- Spouse: Bridget Mary Kelly
- Children: 8
- Education: University College Cork (attended)

Military service
- Branch/service: British Army
- Unit: 1st Regiment of Life Guards
- Battles/wars: Second Boer War

Patrick Michael Kelly (10 August 1875 – 20 November 1934) was an Irish soldier, farmer and politician. He was a member of the Irish Free State Oireachtas as a Teachta Dála (TD) for the Clare constituency from 1927 to 1932.

== Biography ==
He was the eldest son of Tom Bán Kelly and Bridget Davoren and the grandson of the successful landowner, Pat Mór Kelly, and Bridget Gibson from Fortview in County Clare. As a soldier he was a member of the Household Cavalry, with whom he distinguished himself with honours in the Boer War. After the war he returned to County Clare to take over the farm at Clonina and eventually to enter political life. Kelly was known as a leader during Ireland's struggle for independence from Britain in the early 20th century.

He was privately educated at home until 1889, when at the age of 14 he was sent to the Jesuit Mungret College in Limerick where he stayed until 1891. He then became a medical student at University College Cork, but clearly retained a bent for adventure. In 1893, at the age of 18, he joined the British Army to fight in the Boer War in South Africa. His cousin, General Sir Thomas Kelly-Kenny, appointed him to the 1st Regiment of Life Guards for the campaign during the Second Boer War of 1899–1901. The size of South Africa meant that cavalry became an invaluable tool for the generals of both sides. Kelly's cavalry unit was very effective and helped win one of their most significant victories of the Boer War at Paardeberg. He had a very successful career in the First Lifeguards and he was mentioned in dispatches, receiving the Queen's South Africa Medal with six clasps, for his efforts in the Relief of Kimberley and the battles of Paardeberg, Wittebergen, Driefontein, Diamond Hill and Johannesburg. Kelly was honoured for his service in the Boer War for the Life Guards. In London during a visit to the Royal Family in 1898, Kaiser Wilhelm II of Germany picked out Kelly as the best turned-out horseman and soldier in the regiment.

In the 1920s he turned his attention to politics becoming a member of the Cumann na nGaedheal party. He was an unsuccessful candidate at the 1923 general election. At the June 1927 general election, Cumann na nGaedheal performed poorly, winning just 47 seats of the 153 seats. However, Kelly was elected to the 5th Dáil Éireann. Kelly was elected for the Clare constituency. He served until September of that year, as the 5th Dáil is the shortest Dáil in the history of the state, lasting only 98 days. Following victory in two by-elections, the President of the Executive Council, W. T. Cosgrave called a snap election in September 1927. Cumann na nGaedheal regained most of the ground lost in June, winning 62 seats and 39% of the vote. In the September election for the 6th Dáil which was held on 11 October 1927, Kelly was re-elected, receiving 5,647 votes. He lost his seat at the 1932 general election.

In 1934, at the age of 59, he died of pneumonia and septicaemia, while he was on the farm. He left his wife, Bridget, and eight children, the youngest of which was just one year old.

His friend Paddy J. Egan of Tullamore, wrote the following appreciation of him in the Mungret Annual in 1935:

"I remember Pat Kelly very well at Mungret. He was one of the personalities amongst the Lay Boys of the College about 1890. A bright, breezy, and always cheerful lad, very original and liked by all of us, he was one of the few chaps the mention of whose name provoked smiles of affection in all directions. I would not describe him as a worshipper at the shrine of discipline; in fact, I know that he held somewhat elastic views when he came to interpret rules and regulations. Apart from his likeable disposition, this certainly did contribute something to his popularity. Most of us did not have either his initiative or courage in this respect... I gather that he was personally as popular in the Dáil as he was in Mungret years ago. It was with a keen sense of regret that I heard of his death".

Dáil	Election	Deputy (Party)	Deputy (Party)	Deputy (Party)	Deputy (Party)	Deputy (Party)
2nd	1921	Éamon de Valera (SF)	Brian O'Higgins (SF)	Seán Liddy (SF)	Patrick Brennan (SF)	4 seats 1921–1923
3rd	1922	Éamon de Valera (AT-SF)	Brian O'Higgins (AT-SF)	Seán Liddy (PT-SF)	Patrick Brennan (PT-SF)	4 seats 1921–1923
4th	1923	Éamon de Valera (Rep)	Brian O'Higgins (Rep)	Conor Hogan (FP)	Patrick Hogan (Lab)	Eoin MacNeill (CnaG)
5th	1927 (Jun)	Éamon de Valera (FF)	Patrick Houlihan (FF)	Thomas Falvey (FP)	Patrick Hogan (Lab)	Patrick Kelly (CnaG)
6th	1927 (Sep)	Éamon de Valera (FF)	Patrick Houlihan (FF)	Martin Sexton (FF)	Patrick Hogan (Lab)	Patrick Kelly (CnaG)
7th	1932	Éamon de Valera (FF)	Seán O'Grady (FF)	Martin Sexton (FF)	Patrick Hogan (Lab)	Patrick Burke (CnaG)
8th	1933	Éamon de Valera (FF)	Seán O'Grady (FF)	Patrick Houlihan (FF)	Patrick Hogan (Lab)	Patrick Burke (CnaG)
9th	1937	Éamon de Valera (FF)	Seán O'Grady (FF)	Thomas Burke (FP)	Patrick Hogan (Lab)	Patrick Burke (FG)
10th	1938	Éamon de Valera (FF)	Seán O'Grady (FF)	Thomas Burke (FP)	Peter O'Loghlen (FF)	Patrick Burke (FG)
11th	1943	Éamon de Valera (FF)	Seán O'Grady (FF)	Thomas Burke (FP)	Patrick Hogan (Lab)	Patrick Burke (FG)
12th	1944	Éamon de Valera (FF)	Seán O'Grady (FF)	Thomas Burke (FP)	Peter O'Loghlen (FF)	Patrick Burke (FG)
12th	1945 by-election	Éamon de Valera (FF)	Seán O'Grady (FF)	Thomas Burke (FP)	Peter O'Loghlen (FF)	Patrick Shanahan (FF)
13th	1948	Éamon de Valera (FF)	Seán O'Grady (FF)	Thomas Burke (FP)	Patrick Hogan (Lab)	4 seats 1948–1969
14th	1951	Éamon de Valera (FF)	Patrick Hillery (FF)	William Murphy (FG)	Patrick Hogan (Lab)	4 seats 1948–1969
15th	1954	Éamon de Valera (FF)	Patrick Hillery (FF)	William Murphy (FG)	Patrick Hogan (Lab)	4 seats 1948–1969
16th	1957	Éamon de Valera (FF)	Patrick Hillery (FF)	William Murphy (FG)	Patrick Hogan (Lab)	4 seats 1948–1969
16th	1959 by-election	Seán Ó Ceallaigh (FF)	Patrick Hillery (FF)	William Murphy (FG)	Patrick Hogan (Lab)	4 seats 1948–1969
17th	1961	Seán Ó Ceallaigh (FF)	Patrick Hillery (FF)	William Murphy (FG)	Patrick Hogan (Lab)	4 seats 1948–1969
18th	1965	Seán Ó Ceallaigh (FF)	Patrick Hillery (FF)	William Murphy (FG)	Patrick Hogan (Lab)	4 seats 1948–1969
18th	1968 by-election	Seán Ó Ceallaigh (FF)	Patrick Hillery (FF)	Sylvester Barrett (FF)	Patrick Hogan (Lab)	4 seats 1948–1969
19th	1969	Frank Taylor (FG)	Patrick Hillery (FF)	Sylvester Barrett (FF)	3 seats 1969–1981	
20th	1973	Frank Taylor (FG)	Brendan Daly (FF)	Sylvester Barrett (FF)	3 seats 1969–1981	
21st	1977	Frank Taylor (FG)	Brendan Daly (FF)	Sylvester Barrett (FF)	3 seats 1969–1981	
22nd	1981	Madeleine Taylor (FG)	Brendan Daly (FF)	Sylvester Barrett (FF)	Bill Loughnane (FF)	4 seats since 1981
23rd	1982 (Feb)	Donal Carey (FG)	Brendan Daly (FF)	Sylvester Barrett (FF)	Bill Loughnane (FF)	4 seats since 1981
24th	1982 (Nov)	Donal Carey (FG)	Brendan Daly (FF)	Sylvester Barrett (FF)	Madeleine Taylor-Quinn (FG)	4 seats since 1981
25th	1987	Donal Carey (FG)	Brendan Daly (FF)	Síle de Valera (FF)	Madeleine Taylor-Quinn (FG)	4 seats since 1981
26th	1989	Donal Carey (FG)	Brendan Daly (FF)	Síle de Valera (FF)	Madeleine Taylor-Quinn (FG)	4 seats since 1981
27th	1992	Donal Carey (FG)	Moosajee Bhamjee (Lab)	Síle de Valera (FF)	Tony Killeen (FF)	4 seats since 1981
28th	1997	Donal Carey (FG)	Brendan Daly (FF)	Síle de Valera (FF)	Tony Killeen (FF)	4 seats since 1981
29th	2002	Pat Breen (FG)	James Breen (Ind.)	Síle de Valera (FF)	Tony Killeen (FF)	4 seats since 1981
30th	2007	Pat Breen (FG)	Joe Carey (FG)	Timmy Dooley (FF)	Tony Killeen (FF)	4 seats since 1981
31st	2011	Pat Breen (FG)	Joe Carey (FG)	Timmy Dooley (FF)	Michael McNamara (Lab)	4 seats since 1981
32nd	2016	Pat Breen (FG)	Joe Carey (FG)	Timmy Dooley (FF)	Michael Harty (Ind.)	4 seats since 1981
33rd	2020	Violet-Anne Wynne (SF)	Joe Carey (FG)	Cathal Crowe (FF)	Michael McNamara (Ind.)	4 seats since 1981
34th	2024	Donna McGettigan (SF)	Joe Cooney (FG)	Cathal Crowe (FF)	Timmy Dooley (FF)	4 seats since 1981
