= Clare (Dáil constituency) =

Dáil constituency (1921–present)

Coordinates: 52°50′N 9°00′W

- Dáil constituency
- Location of Clare within Ireland
- Interactive map of constituency boundaries since the 2024 general election
- Major settlements: Ennis; Ennistymon; Kilrush; Newmarket-on-Fergus; Shannon

Current constituency
- Created: 1921
- Seats: 4 (1921–1923); 5 (1923–1948); 4 (1948–1969); 3 (1969–1981); 4 (1981–)
- TDs: Joe Cooney (FG); Cathal Crowe (FF); Timmy Dooley (FF); Donna McGettigan (SF)
- Local government area: County Clare
- Created from: East Clare; West Clare
- EP constituency: South

Clare is a parliamentary constituency represented in Dáil Éireann, the lower house of the Irish parliament or Oireachtas. The constituency elects four deputies (Teachtaí Dála, commonly known as TDs) on the system of proportional representation by means of the single transferable vote (PR-STV).

== History ==
Clare is historically a Fianna Fáil stronghold. The party founder Éamon de Valera served the constituency for 38 years, from 1921 to 1959, for many years of that time as Taoiseach and then, on his resignation as a TD, as president of Ireland. From 1917 to 1922 he had been Sinn Féin Westminster MP for the preceding constituency of East Clare. His granddaughter, Síle de Valera, represented the constituency from 1987 to 2007. Other notable former deputies include Patrick Hillery (later president 1976–1990), the long-serving Ceann Comhairle (chairperson of the Dáil) Patrick Hogan and Moosajee Bhamjee, the first Muslim TD.

== Boundaries ==
The constituency was created by the Government of Ireland Act 1920 and has been in use for Dáil elections since the 1921 election. The constituency's boundaries have varied since its formation in 1921. From the 2020 general election, the constituency spans the entire area of County Clare. The Constituency Review Report 2023 of the Electoral Commission recommended that no change be made at the next general election. The Electoral (Amendment) Act 2023 defines the constituency as:

"The county of Clare."

Changes to the Clare constituency
Years	TDs	Boundaries	Notes
1921–1923	4	County Clare.	Constituency created from East Clare and West Clare
1923–1937	5	County Clare.	
1937–1948	5	County Clare; and in County Galway, the district electoral divisions of Ardnamullivan, Ballycahalan, Ballynagar, Beagh, Cahermore, Cappard, Coos, Derrylaur, Doorus, Drumkeary, Drummin, Gort, Kilbeacanty, Kill-inny, Kiltartan, Kilthomas, Kinvarra, Loughatorick, Marblehill, Skehanagh and Woodford.	Transfer from former constituency of Galway
1948–1969	4	County Clare.	
1969–1977	3	County Clare, except the part in the constituency of Clare–South Galway.	Transfer to Clare–South Galway of Abbey, Carran, Castletown, Derreen, Drum-creehy, Gleninagh, Lisdoonvarna, Mount Elva, Noughaval, Oughtmama, Rathborney, in the former Rural District of Ballyvaghan; Ballyeighter, Boston, Corrofin, Glenroe, Killinaboy, Kiltoraght, Muckanagh, Rath, Ruan, in the former Rural District of Corrofin; Crusheen, Kilraghtis, in the former Rural District of Ennis; Cloghaun, in the former Rural District of Ennistimon; Ayle, Boherglass, Caherhurly, Cahermurphy, Cappaghabaun, Carrowbaun, Cloonusker, Coolreagh, Corlea, Derrynagittagh, Drummaan, Feakle, Inishcaltra North, Inishcaltra South, Killaloe, Mountshannon, Ogonnelloe, Scarriff, in the former Rural District of Scarriff; Ballynahinch, Caher, Glendree, Killanena, Kiltannon, Loughea, Newgrove, Rathclooney, Toberbreeda, Tulla, in the former Rural District of Tulla.
1977–1981	3	County Clare, except the part in the constituency of Galway West.	Part in Galway West being Abbey, Carran, Castletown, Derreen, Drumcreehy, Gleninagh, Lisdoonvarna, Mount Elva, Noughaval, Oughtmama, Rathborney, in the former Rural District of Ballyvaghan; Ballyeighter, Boston, Corrofin, Glenroe, Killinaboy, Kiltoraght, Muckanagh, Rath, Ruan, in the former Rural District of Corrofin; Dysert, Templemaley, in the former Rural District of Ennis; Ballagh, Ballyea, Ballysteen, Cloghaun, Clooney, Ennistimon, Kilfenora, Killaspuglonane, Killilagh, Kilshanny, Liscannor, Lurraga, Magherareagh, Smithstown, in the former Rural District of Ennistimon.
1981–1992	4	County Clare.	Transfer from Galway West
1992–2011	4	County Clare, except the part in the constituency of Limerick East.	Transfer to Limerick East of the townlands of Athlunkard, Ballykeelaun, Cloonoughter, Fairyhill, Garraun, Gortatogher, Kilquane, Knockballynameath, Parteen, Quinspool South, Rosmadda East, Rosmadda West, St. Thomas' Island, Shannakyle, in the district electoral division of Ballyglass, in the former Rural District of Meelick.
2011–2020	4	County Clare, except the part in the constituency of Limerick City.	
2020–	4	County Clare.	Transfer from Limerick City

== TDs ==
Teachtaí Dála (TDs) for Clare 1921–
Key to parties: CnaG = Cumann na nGaedheal; FP = Farmers' Party; FF = Fianna Fáil; FG = Fine Gael; Ind. = Independent; Lab = Labour; Rep = Republican; SF = Sinn Féin; AT-SF = Sinn Féin (Anti-Treaty); PT-SF = Sinn Féin (Pro-Treaty)
Dáil	Election	Deputy (Party)	Deputy (Party)	Deputy (Party)	Deputy (Party)	Deputy (Party)
2nd	1921	Éamon de Valera (SF)	Seán Liddy (SF)	Brian O'Higgins (SF)	Patrick Brennan (SF)	4 seats 1921–1923
3rd	1922	Éamon de Valera (AT-SF)	Seán Liddy (PT-SF)	Brian O'Higgins (AT-SF)	Patrick Brennan (PT-SF)	4 seats 1921–1923
4th	1923	Éamon de Valera (Rep)	Conor Hogan (FP)	Brian O'Higgins (Rep)	Patrick Hogan (Lab)	Eoin MacNeill (CnaG)
5th	1927 (Jun)	Éamon de Valera (FF)	Thomas Falvey (FP)	Patrick Houlihan (FF)	Patrick Hogan (Lab)	Patrick Kelly (CnaG)
6th	1927 (Sep)	Éamon de Valera (FF)	Martin Sexton (FF)	Patrick Houlihan (FF)	Patrick Hogan (Lab)	Patrick Kelly (CnaG)
7th	1932	Éamon de Valera (FF)	Martin Sexton (FF)	Seán O'Grady (FF)	Patrick Hogan (Lab)	Patrick Burke (CnaG)
8th	1933	Éamon de Valera (FF)	Patrick Houlihan (FF)	Seán O'Grady (FF)	Patrick Hogan (Lab)	Patrick Burke (CnaG)
9th	1937	Éamon de Valera (FF)	Thomas Burke (FP)	Seán O'Grady (FF)	Patrick Hogan (Lab)	Patrick Burke (FG)
10th	1938	Éamon de Valera (FF)	Thomas Burke (FP)	Seán O'Grady (FF)	Peter O'Loghlen (FF)	Patrick Burke (FG)
11th	1943	Éamon de Valera (FF)	Thomas Burke (FP)	Seán O'Grady (FF)	Patrick Hogan (Lab)	Patrick Burke (FG)
12th	1944	Éamon de Valera (FF)	Thomas Burke (FP)	Seán O'Grady (FF)	Peter O'Loghlen (FF)	Patrick Burke (FG)
12th	1945 by-election	Éamon de Valera (FF)	Thomas Burke (FP)	Seán O'Grady (FF)	Peter O'Loghlen (FF)	Patrick Shanahan (FF)
13th	1948	Éamon de Valera (FF)	Thomas Burke (FP)	Seán O'Grady (FF)	Patrick Hogan (Note: Hogan was Ceann Comhairle of the Dáil from 1951 to 1967. As the outgoing Ceann Comhairle, Hogan was automatically re-elected at the 1954, 1957, 1961 and 1965 general elections.) (Lab)	4 seats 1948–1969
14th	1951	Éamon de Valera (FF)	William Murphy (FG)	Patrick Hillery (FF)	Patrick Hogan (Lab)	4 seats 1948–1969
15th	1954	Éamon de Valera (FF)	William Murphy (FG)	Patrick Hillery (FF)	Patrick Hogan (Lab)	4 seats 1948–1969
16th	1957	Éamon de Valera (FF)	William Murphy (FG)	Patrick Hillery (FF)	Patrick Hogan (Lab)	4 seats 1948–1969
16th	1959 by-election	Seán Ó Ceallaigh (FF)	William Murphy (FG)	Patrick Hillery (FF)	Patrick Hogan (Lab)	4 seats 1948–1969
17th	1961	Seán Ó Ceallaigh (FF)	William Murphy (FG)	Patrick Hillery (FF)	Patrick Hogan (Lab)	4 seats 1948–1969
18th	1965	Seán Ó Ceallaigh (FF)	William Murphy (FG)	Patrick Hillery (FF)	Patrick Hogan (Lab)	4 seats 1948–1969
18th	1968 by-election	Seán Ó Ceallaigh (FF)	Sylvester Barrett (FF)	Patrick Hillery (FF)	Patrick Hogan (Lab)	4 seats 1948–1969
19th	1969	Frank Taylor (FG)	Sylvester Barrett (FF)	Patrick Hillery (FF)	3 seats 1969–1981	
20th	1973	Frank Taylor (FG)	Sylvester Barrett (FF)	Brendan Daly (FF)	3 seats 1969–1981	
21st	1977	Frank Taylor (FG)	Sylvester Barrett (FF)	Brendan Daly (FF)	3 seats 1969–1981	
22nd	1981	Madeleine Taylor (FG)	Sylvester Barrett (FF)	Brendan Daly (FF)	Bill Loughnane (FF)	4 seats since 1981
23rd	1982 (Feb)	Donal Carey (FG)	Sylvester Barrett (FF)	Brendan Daly (FF)	Bill Loughnane (FF)	4 seats since 1981
24th	1982 (Nov)	Donal Carey (FG)	Sylvester Barrett (FF)	Brendan Daly (FF)	Madeleine Taylor-Quinn (FG)	4 seats since 1981
25th	1987	Donal Carey (FG)	Síle de Valera (FF)	Brendan Daly (FF)	Madeleine Taylor-Quinn (FG)	4 seats since 1981
26th	1989	Donal Carey (FG)	Síle de Valera (FF)	Brendan Daly (FF)	Madeleine Taylor-Quinn (FG)	4 seats since 1981
27th	1992	Donal Carey (FG)	Síle de Valera (FF)	Tony Killeen (FF)	Moosajee Bhamjee (Lab)	4 seats since 1981
28th	1997	Donal Carey (FG)	Síle de Valera (FF)	Tony Killeen (FF)	Brendan Daly (FF)	4 seats since 1981
29th	2002	Pat Breen (FG)	Síle de Valera (FF)	Tony Killeen (FF)	James Breen (Ind.)	4 seats since 1981
30th	2007	Pat Breen (FG)	Timmy Dooley (FF)	Tony Killeen (FF)	Joe Carey (FG)	4 seats since 1981
31st	2011	Pat Breen (FG)	Timmy Dooley (FF)	Michael McNamara (Lab)	Joe Carey (FG)	4 seats since 1981
32nd	2016	Pat Breen (FG)	Timmy Dooley (FF)	Michael Harty (Ind.)	Joe Carey (FG)	4 seats since 1981
33rd	2020	Violet-Anne Wynne (SF)	Cathal Crowe (FF)	Michael McNamara (Ind.)	Joe Carey (FG)	4 seats since 1981
34th	2024	Donna McGettigan (SF)	Cathal Crowe (FF)	Timmy Dooley (FF)	Joe Cooney (FG)	4 seats since 1981

Note: The columns in this table are used only for presentational purposes, and no significance should be attached to the order of columns. For details of the order in which seats were won at each election, see the detailed results of that election.

== Elections ==
*: Outgoing TD

=== 2024 general election ===
2024 general election: Clare
Party	Candidate	FPv%	Count															
Party	Candidate	FPv%	1	2	3	4	5	6	7	8	9	10	11	12	13	14	15	16
Fianna Fáil	Timmy Dooley	18.6	11,313	11,319	11,340	11,355	11,412	11,481	11,528	11,542	11,589	11,801	11,912	12,079	13,566			
Fianna Fáil	Cathal Crowe	13.6	8,261	8,266	8,277	8,286	8,315	8,368	8,404	8,426	8,457	8,649	8,807	9,096	10,470	11,424	12,344	
Sinn Féin	Donna McGettigan	12.9	7,843	7,853	7,880	7,953	7,979	8,050	8,100	8,342	8,477	8,531	9,371	9,784	9,971	9,993	10,803	12,036
Fine Gael	Joe Cooney	12.4	7,575	7,578	7,580	7,588	7,647	7,736	7,772	7,783	7,814	8,155	8,267	8,392	8,767	8,859	9,680	10,790
Fine Gael	Leonora Carey	8.6	5,251	5,254	5,269	5,277	5,298	5,313	5,328	5,344	5,368	5,860	5,991	6,093	6,427	6,538	6,870	8,462
Green	Róisín Garvey	6.2	3,770	3,781	3,802	3,820	3,875	3,882	3,895	4,000	4,029	4,138	4,946	5,125	5,425	5,500	5,825	
Fianna Fáil	Rita McInerney	5.7	3,473	3,475	3,484	3,501	3,531	3,548	3,684	3,694	3,720	4,295	4,368	4,592				
Independent Ireland	Eddie Punch	4.2	2,583	2,601	2,608	2,635	2,693	2,768	2,899	2,943	3,502	3,607	3,776	4,671	4,922	4,978		
Social Democrats	Hilary Tonge	3.5	2,144	2,169	2,192	2,237	2,250	2,268	2,283	2,650	2,680	2,723						
Fine Gael	Tom Nolan	3.5	2,139	2,141	2,145	2,151	2,159	2,169	2,239	2,247	2,269							
Aontú	June Dillon	3.4	2,099	2,108	2,111	2,133	2,155	2,180	2,245	2,284	2,649	2,733	2,857					
Irish Freedom	Michael Leahy	2.1	1,282	1,333	1,334	1,346	1,366	1,388	1,461	1,472								
PBP–Solidarity	Caitríona Ní Chatháin (Note: Ní Chatháin is a member of Solidarity.)	1.3	820	835	861	887	894	907	924									
Independent	Kevin Hassett	1.1	670	675	680	689	707	789										
Independent	Matthew Moroney	0.9	538	543	556	568	596											
Independent	Paddy Murphy	0.7	443	448	452	464												
Independent	Violet-Anne Wynne	0.5	310	316	328													
Independent	Amanda Major	0.3	205	208														
The Irish People	Michael Loughrey	0.2	101															
Rabharta	Barry O'Donovan	0.1	87															
Electorate: 96,398 Valid: 60,907 Spoilt: 459 Quota: 12,182 Turnout: 63.7%

Michael McNamara vacated his seat on taking his seat in the European Parliament on 16 July 2024 following his election to the South constituency at the 2024 European Parliament election. Joe Carey resigned as a TD on 27 August 2024. Both seats remained vacant until the dissolution of the 33rd Dáil on 8 November 2024.

=== 2020 general election ===
2020 general election: Clare
Party	Candidate	FPv%	Count									
Party	Candidate	FPv%	1	2	3	4	5	6	7	8	9	10
Sinn Féin	Violet-Anne Wynne	15.1	8,987	8,998	9,063	9,142	9,599	9,807	9,889	10,082	10,291	11,903
Fianna Fáil	Cathal Crowe	14.0	8,355	8,372	8,402	8,508	8,541	8,641	8,834	10,115	10,659	11,471
Fianna Fáil	Timmy Dooley	13.0	7,763	7,767	7,783	7,805	7,826	7,906	8,087	9,250	9,943	10,630
Independent	Michael McNamara	12.3	7,332	7,350	7,465	7,588	7,702	8,169	8,535	9,380	10,113	12,205
Fine Gael	Joe Carey	9.6	5,684	5,688	5,721	5,745	5,771	5,814	6,485	6,669	10,193	11,345
Green	Róisín Garvey	9.5	5,624	5,640	5,735	5,778	6,213	6,337	6,626	6,959	7,339	
Fine Gael	Pat Breen	9.1	5,406	5,409	5,454	5,478	5,494	5,578	5,987	6,401		
Fianna Fáil	Rita McInerney	7.0	4,136	4,146	4,179	4,233	4,250	4,440	4,606			
Fine Gael	Martin Conway	3.8	2,285	2,287	2,310	2,322	2,340	2,424				
Independent	Joseph Woulfe	2.0	1,218	1,226	1,285	1,402	1,504					
Solidarity–PBP	Theresa O'Donohue (Note: O'Donohue was a member of People Before Profit.)	2.0	1,196	1,207	1,254	1,286						
Irish Freedom	Michael Leahy	1.2	704	764	807							
Independent	David Barrett (Note: Barrett was a member of the Moderate Party. It is an unregistered political party, so candidates appeared on the ballot as non-party.)	0.7	400	404								
Independent	Trudy Leyden	0.4	218	222								
Renua	Conor O Brien	0.3	187									
Electorate: 91,120 Valid: 59,495 Spoilt: 519 Quota: 11,900 Turnout: 60,014 (65.9%)

=== 2016 general election ===
2016 general election: Clare
Party	Candidate	FPv%	Count											
Party	Candidate	FPv%	1	2	3	4	5	6	7	8	9	10	11	12
Fianna Fáil	Timmy Dooley	17.9	10,215	10,292	10,382	10,480	10,624	10,772	12,150					
Independent	Michael Harty	15.1	8,629	8,812	8,978	9,605	9,840	10,360	10,688	10,843	11,962			
Fine Gael	Pat Breen	11.5	6,583	6,621	6,640	6,857	7,337	7,420	7,512	7,537	7,815	7,910	8,292	10,088
Fine Gael	Joe Carey	10.7	6,071	6,115	6,148	6,195	6,778	6,894	7,032	7,062	7,422	7,535	7,931	9,915
Fianna Fáil	Michael McDonagh	8.3	4,726	4,749	4,764	4,954	4,997	5,056	5,497	5,887	6,139	6,229	6,929	7,762
Labour	Michael McNamara	7.8	4,472	4,516	4,587	4,672	4,896	5,347	5,498	5,569	5,955	6,090	6,844	
Sinn Féin	Noeleen Moran	7.4	4,216	4,277	4,519	4,611	4,664	4,957	5,058	5,083	5,473	5,601		
Fianna Fáil	Clare Colleran Molloy	4.6	2,639	2,673	2,697	2,716	2,824	2,880						
Independent	Anne Norton	3.9	2,240	2,321	2,442	2,521	2,686	2,982	3,152	3,205				
Fine Gael	Mary Howard	3.6	2,053	2,076	2,098	2,119								
Green	Fergal Smith	3.0	1,700	1,764	2,092	2,144	2,193							
Independent	Ian Lynch	2.6	1,494	1,535	1,575									
Fís Nua	Niamh O'Brien	2.0	1,154	1,216										
Independent	Richard Cahill	1.2	699											
Independent	André Sibo Hakizimana	0.1	70											
Independent	Dermot Mulqueen	0.1	39											
Electorate: 83,660 Valid: 57,000 Spoilt: 407 (0.7%) Quota: 11,401 Turnout: 57,407 (68.6%)

=== 2011 general election ===
2011 general election: Clare
Party	Candidate	FPv%	Count											
Party	Candidate	FPv%	1	2	3	4	5	6	7	8	9	10	11	12
Fine Gael	Pat Breen	17.0	9,855	9,865	9,879	9,896	9,917	9,949	10,084	10,207	10,479	10,988	13,334	
Labour	Michael McNamara	14.8	8,572	8,581	8,615	8,659	8,697	8,871	9,071	9,584	9,985	10,552	11,883	
Fine Gael	Joe Carey	13.5	7,840	7,859	7,876	7,888	7,906	7,953	8,028	8,160	8,334	8,617	10,961	12,489
Fine Gael	Tony Mulcahy	11.8	6,829	6,832	6,861	6,866	6,881	6,932	6,980	7,106	7,228	7,438		
Fianna Fáil	Timmy Dooley	11.7	6,789	6,795	6,806	6,813	6,823	6,858	6,906	6,963	7,071	10,597	10,965	11,021
Independent	James Breen	11.2	6,491	6,546	6,583	6,599	6,662	6,795	7,029	7,136	7,678	8,732	9,354	9,520
Fianna Fáil	John Hillery	10.4	6,015	6,020	6,044	6,053	6,066	6,093	6,161	6,242	6,468			
Independent	Brian Markham	2.7	1,543	1,547	1,565	1,585	1,637	1,825	2,064	2,157				
Green	Brian Meaney	2.0	1,154	1,158	1,163	1,172	1,187	1,266	1,339					
Independent	Jim Connolly	1.7	978	1,002	1,015	1,031	1,075	1,216						
Independent	Madeline McAleer	0.7	428	429	450	487	509							
Independent	Ann Cronin	0.7	419	429	440	497	521							
Independent	Gerry Walshe	0.6	328	332	340	352								
Independent	Sarah Ferrigan	0.4	252	260	265									
Independent	J. J. McCabe	0.4	248	252										
Independent	Patrick Brassil	0.3	175											
Electorate: 82,745 Valid: 57,916 Spoilt: 579 (1.0%) Quota: 11,584 Turnout: 58,495 (70.7%)

=== 2007 general election ===
2007 general election: Clare
Party	Candidate	FPv%	Count								
Party	Candidate	FPv%	1	2	3	4	5	6	7	8	9
Fianna Fáil	Timmy Dooley	19.1	10,791	11,013	11,273	11,634					
Fianna Fáil	Tony Killeen	14.8	8,321	8,463	8,660	8,976	9,384	9,696	14,083		
Fine Gael	Pat Breen	12.5	7,036	7,204	7,308	7,695	8,572	10,358	11,112	11,667	
Fine Gael	Joe Carey	10.3	5,818	6,008	6,116	6,664	7,547	9,090	9,417	9,801	9,982
Fianna Fáil	Brendan Daly	10.1	5,712	5,870	5,993	6,089	6,278	6,807			
Independent	James Breen	9.3	5,218	5,340	5,689	6,481	6,876	7,451	8,203	9,334	9,526
Fine Gael	Madeleine Taylor-Quinn	6.4	3,592	3,719	3,887	4,419	5,170				
Fine Gael	Tony Mulcahy	6.0	3,408	3,493	3,611	3,833					
Green	Brian Meaney	5.1	2,858	3,163	3,605						
Sinn Féin	Anna Prior	3.4	1,929	2,012							
Labour	Pascal Fitzgerald	1.6	892								
Progressive Democrats	Murt Collins	1.4	810								
Electorate: 79,555 Valid: 56,385 Spoilt: 385 (0.7%) Quota: 11,278 Turnout: 56,770 (71.4%)

=== 2002 general election ===
2002 general election: Clare
Party	Candidate	FPv%	Count				
Party	Candidate	FPv%	1	2	3	4	5
Independent	James Breen	19.5	9,721	10,054			
Fianna Fáil	Tony Killeen	16.3	8,130	8,252	8,640	9,064	9,482
Fianna Fáil	Síle de Valera	15.6	7,755	7,866	8,464	8,819	9,370
Fianna Fáil	Brendan Daly	13.5	6,717	6,786	6,914	7,086	7,683
Fine Gael	Pat Breen	9.1	4,541	4,701	5,265	6,934	11,396
Fine Gael	Madeleine Taylor-Quinn	8.3	4,124	4,349	5,034	6,726	
Fine Gael	Donal Carey	8.1	4,015	4,227	4,591		
Green	Brian Meaney	5.8	2,903	3,508			
Labour	Michael Corley	3.4	1,720				
Christian Solidarity	Derek Whelan	0.4	176				
Electorate: 80,412 Valid: 49,802 Spoilt: 539 (1.1%) Quota: 9,961 Turnout: 50,341 (62.6%)

=== 1997 general election ===
1997 general election: Clare
Party	Candidate	FPv%	Count								
Party	Candidate	FPv%	1	2	3	4	5	6	7	8	9
Fianna Fáil	Tony Killeen	17.4	8,169	8,257	8,377	8,527	8,642	8,902	9,937		
Fianna Fáil	Síle de Valera	17.1	8,025	8,104	8,217	8,403	8,531	8,823	9,709		
Fine Gael	Donal Carey	16.6	7,781	7,857	7,967	8,121	8,664	9,078	9,633		
Fianna Fáil	Brendan Daly	15.8	7,420	7,511	7,566	7,661	7,731	7,838	8,368	8,790	9,042
Fine Gael	Madeleine Taylor-Quinn	13.5	6,325	6,402	6,472	6,567	7,200	7,655	8,160	8,297	8,376
Progressive Democrats	Mary Mannion	6.9	3,250	3,280	3,340	3,445	3,531	3,829			
Labour	Brídín Twist	3.6	1,684	1,710	1,809	1,882					
Green	Brian Meaney	3.6	1,682	1,749	1,900	2,033	2,279				
National Party	Rita O'Connor	1.9	876	1,025	1,145						
Independent	Brigid Makowski	2.0	944	982							
Christian Solidarity	Joe Aston	1.1	499								
Independent	Michael McInerney	0.5	234								
Electorate: 71,491 Valid: 46,889 Spoilt: 477 (1.0%) Quota: 9,378 Turnout: 47,366 (66.3%)

=== 1992 general election ===
1992 general election: Clare
Party	Candidate	FPv%	Count								
Party	Candidate	FPv%	1	2	3	4	5	6	7	8	9
Fianna Fáil	Tony Killeen	15.3	6,814	6,899	6,939	7,062	7,386	8,471	8,771	9,149	
Fianna Fáil	Síle de Valera	15.1	6,752	6,809	6,874	6,989	7,177	8,280	8,567	8,761	8,825
Fine Gael	Donal Carey	14.7	6,567	6,609	6,627	6,790	7,553	7,934	11,963		
Fianna Fáil	Brendan Daly	13.3	5,940	5,963	5,984	6,031	6,209	6,991	7,496	7,844	7,905
Labour	Moosajee Bhamjee	11.5	5,113	5,152	5,290	5,644	6,413	6,620	7,086	8,908	8,985
Fine Gael	Madeleine Taylor-Quinn	10.9	4,873	4,914	4,927	5,021	5,631	5,795			
Fianna Fáil	Colm Wiley	8.0	3,582	3,594	3,611	3,639	3,849				
Progressive Democrats	Mary Mannion	6.9	3,112	3,130	3,163	3,237					
Independent	Frankie Neylon	2.2	977	1,042	1,102						
Sinn Féin	Mike McKee	1.0	459	473							
Independent	Michael McInerney	0.9	419								
Electorate: 66,042 Valid: 44,608 Spoilt: 537 (1.2%) Quota: 8,922 Turnout: 45,145 (68.4%)

=== 1989 general election ===
1989 general election: Clare
Party	Candidate	FPv%	Count				
Party	Candidate	FPv%	1	2	3	4	5
Fine Gael	Donal Carey	19.7	8,730	8,840	9,985		
Fianna Fáil	Brendan Daly	18.3	8,130	8,148	8,253	8,279	9,331
Fine Gael	Madeleine Taylor-Quinn	16.7	7,384	7,493	8,790	9,547	
Fianna Fáil	Síle de Valera	15.7	6,939	6,976	7,087	7,109	8,936
Fianna Fáil	Michael Guerin	11.6	5,129	5,156	5,257	5,302	6,371
Fianna Fáil	William Loughnane	9.6	4,252	4,279	4,450	4,494	
Progressive Democrats	David O'Keeffe	6.4	2,853	3,383			
Progressive Democrats	Thomas Meaney	1.6	707				
Progressive Democrats	Noel Moran	0.4	184				
Electorate: 63,065 Valid: 44,308 Quota: 8,862 Turnout: 70.3%

=== 1987 general election ===
1987 general election: Clare
Party	Candidate	FPv%	Count							
Party	Candidate	FPv%	1	2	3	4	5	6	7	8
Fianna Fáil	Síle de Valera	18.0	8,530	8,566	8,693	8,970	9,032	10,331		
Fine Gael	Donal Carey	17.0	8,045	8,129	8,192	8,934	9,237	9,672		
Fianna Fáil	Brendan Daly	16.7	7,897	7,928	7,978	8,298	8,388	9,532		
Fine Gael	Madeleine Taylor-Quinn	11.0	5,229	5,328	5,348	5,495	5,657	5,814	5,857	8,742
Fianna Fáil	Frank Barrett	10.1	4,799	4,821	4,872	5,202	5,261	6,052	6,841	7,854
Fianna Fáil	John O'Rourke	8.0	3,796	3,812	3,858	3,989	4,060			
Progressive Democrats	David O'Keeffe	6.5	3,069	3,134	3,188	3,326	5,411	5,559	5,583	
Progressive Democrats	Thomas Meaney	5.4	2,534	2,573	2,621	2,870				
Independent	Thomas Brennan	4.7	2,230	2,333	2,514					
Independent	Brigid Makowski	1.4	644	716						
Labour	Thomas O'Shaughnessy	1.3	600							
Electorate: 64,303 Valid: 47,373 Quota: 9,475 Turnout: 73.7%

=== November 1982 general election ===
November 1982 general election: Clare
Party	Candidate	FPv%	Count							
Party	Candidate	FPv%	1	2	3	4	5	6	7	8
Fianna Fáil	Sylvester Barrett	19.4	8,793	8,815	9,275					
Fianna Fáil	Brendan Daly	17.7	8,009	8,026	8,651	8,904	10,028			
Fine Gael	Madeleine Taylor-Quinn	16.7	7,553	7,911	8,016	8,741	9,382			
Fianna Fáil	Síle de Valera	14.3	6,471	6,487	6,896	7,050	7,714	7,907	8,315	8,368
Fine Gael	Donal Carey	14.0	6,339	6,730	6,796	7,498	8,222	8,253	8,497	8,775
Independent	Bill Loughnane	5.9	2,674	2,751	3,185	3,641				
Labour	Agnes McCarthy	5.2	2,344	2,373	2,399					
Fianna Fáil	Colm Wiley	4.7	2,133	2,154						
Fine Gael	Séamus Durack	2.1	934							
Electorate: 60,355 Valid: 45,250 Quota: 9,051 Turnout: 74.9%

=== February 1982 general election ===
February 1982 general election: Clare
Party	Candidate	FPv%	Count					
Party	Candidate	FPv%	1	2	3	4	5	6
Fianna Fáil	Brendan Daly	22.5	9,819					
Fianna Fáil	Bill Loughnane	20.3	8,840					
Fine Gael	Donal Carey	17.4	7,570	7,635	7,660	7,680	7,855	8,778
Fianna Fáil	Sylvester Barrett	16.6	7,216	8,078	8,111	8,031	8,511	8,855
Fine Gael	Madeleine Taylor	15.2	6,602	6,718	6,729	6,741	6,952	7,662
Labour	Agnes McCarthy	4.5	1,957	1,985	2,001	2,048	2,214	
Independent	Joe O'Connell	2.8	1,233	1,255	1,262	1,378		
Irish Republican Socialist	Brigid Makowski	0.5	232	238	243			
Independent Fianna Fáil	Frank McTigue	0.2	100	106				
Electorate: 58,727 Valid: 43,569 Spoilt: 347 (0.8%) Quota: 8,714 Turnout: 43,916 (74.8%)

Bill Loughnane died on 18 October 1982. On 27 October 1982, a government motion to issue a writ for a by-election to fill the vacancy was carried by a vote of 84 to 77. This writ was cancelled when the Dáil was dissolved on 4 November 1982.

=== 1981 general election ===
1981 general election: Clare
Party	Candidate	FPv%	Count										
Party	Candidate	FPv%	1	2	3	4	5	6	7	8	9	10	11
Fianna Fáil	Brendan Daly	24.0	10,896										
Fianna Fáil	Sylvester Barrett	18.9	8,574	9,456									
Fine Gael	Madeleine Taylor	13.0	5,881	6,094	6,118	6,120	6,133	6,140	6,183	6,454	7,248	8,616	8,993
Fine Gael	Donal Carey	11.5	5,203	5,262	5,272	5,273	5,292	5,304	5,311	5,480	6,382	7,728	7,954
Fianna Fáil	Bill Loughnane	9.8	4,444	4,743	4,960	4,962	4,972	4,984	5,004	5,733	6,082	6,279	8,504
Fine Gael	Michael Howard	6.2	2,818	2,856	2,864	2,867	2,871	2,882	2,898	3,003	3,344		
Fianna Fáil	Bernard McNamara	5.9	2,676	2,910	3,021	3,022	3,024	3,028	3,038	3,206	3,379	3,550	
Labour	Agnes McCarthy	5.5	2,471	2,518	2,528	2,533	2,536	2,543	2,549	2,898			
Anti H-Block	Thomas McAllister	4.7	2,120	2,157	2,164	2,165	2,169	2,181	2,183				
Independent	Desmond Crowley	0.2	106	116	118	119	119	121					
Independent	Laurence Griffin	0.1	62	71	72	72	73						
Independent	Gerard Nix	0.1	57	58	58	61							
Independent	Hugh O'Brien	0.1	21	22	22								
Electorate: 58,727 Valid: 45,329 Quota: 9,066 Turnout: 77.2%

=== 1977 general election ===
1977 general election: Clare
Party	Candidate	FPv%	Count				
Party	Candidate	FPv%	1	2	3	4	5
Fianna Fáil	Brendan Daly	34.9	11,933				
Fianna Fáil	Sylvester Barrett	34.0	11,626				
Fine Gael	Frank Taylor	14.9	5,080	6,868	7,787	7,875	8,762
Fine Gael	Donal Carey	11.5	3,923	4,555	5,622	5,674	6,632
Labour	Agnes McCarthy	4.4	1,495	2,160	2,881	3,036	
Independent	Hugh O'Brien	0.5	153	448	814		
Electorate: 46,872 Valid: 34,210 Quota: 8,553 Turnout: 73.0%

=== 1973 general election ===
1973 general election: Clare
Party	Candidate	FPv%	Count				
Party	Candidate	FPv%	1	2	3	4	5
Fianna Fáil	Sylvester Barrett	25.3	7,203				
Fianna Fáil	Brendan Daly	20.2	5,758	5,872	5,892	6,049	6,307
Fine Gael	Frank Taylor	18.7	5,330	5,900	5,903	9,946	
Fianna Fáil	Martin Cahill	16.1	4,576	4,683	4,737	4,946	5,223
Fine Gael	Michael Howard	13.5	3,832	4,724	4,726		
Labour	Michael Corley	6.3	1,794				
Electorate: 39,413 Valid: 28,493 Quota: 7,124 Turnout: 72.3%

=== 1969 general election ===
1969 general election: Clare
Party	Candidate	FPv%	Count			
Party	Candidate	FPv%	1	2	3	4
Fianna Fáil	Sylvester Barrett	25.2	7,009			
Fianna Fáil	Patrick Hillery	24.7	6,848	6,912	7,100	
Fine Gael	Frank Taylor	16.9	4,697	4,716	5,083	5,409
Fine Gael	Michael Howard	13.3	3,690	3,732	4,269	4,608
Fianna Fáil	Jack Lynch	12.2	3,383	3,406	3,533	
Labour	Flan Honan	5.8	1,597	1,943		
Labour	Terence Higgins	1.9	533			
Electorate: 38,267 Valid: 27,757 Quota: 6,940 Turnout: 72.5%

Patrick Hillery resigned as TD on 6 January 1973 on his nomination as European Commissioner. The seat remained vacant until the dissolution of the 19th Dáil on 5 February 1973.

=== 1968 by-election ===
Fine Gael TD William Murphy died on 16 November 1967. The by-election was held on 14 March 1968, and was won by the Fianna Fáil candidate Sylvester Barrett.

1968 by-election: Clare
Party	Candidate	FPv%	Count	
Party	Candidate	FPv%	1	2
Fianna Fáil	Sylvester Barrett	58.7	19,066	
Fine Gael	Patrick Bugler	28.7	9,313	10,407
Labour	Flan Honan	11.7	3,799	5,177
Independent	Jean Grace	0.9	293	651
Electorate: 48,182 Valid: 32,471 Quota: 16,236 Turnout: 67.4%

=== 1965 general election ===
A third count was held because of the possibility of a candidate reaching a third of the quota in order to save their deposit.

1965 general election: Clare
Party	Candidate	FPv%	Count		
Party	Candidate	FPv%	1	2	3
Labour	Patrick Hogan (Note: As outgoing Ceann Comhairle, Hogan was returned automatically under Art. 16.6 of the Constitution and the Electoral Act 1963.)	N/A	Returned automatically		
Fianna Fáil	Patrick Hillery	41.8	14,372		
Fine Gael	William Murphy	25.3	8,715		
Fianna Fáil	Seán Ó Ceallaigh	16.9	5,819	11,091	
Fine Gael	Francis Gordon	9.1	3,131	3,316	3,744
Labour	P. A. Ó Síocháin	6.9	2,362	2,677	4,740
Electorate: 47,220 Valid: 34,399 Quota: 8,600 Turnout: 72.9%

Hogan was elected again as Ceann Comhairle on 21 April 1965, leaving the Labour parliamentary party. Hogan retired as Ceann Comhairle on 7 November 1967, and died in office on 24 January 1969.

=== 1961 general election ===
1961 general election: Clare
Party	Candidate	FPv%	Count	
Party	Candidate	FPv%	1	2
Labour	Patrick Hogan (Note: As outgoing Ceann Comhairle, Hogan was returned automatically under Art. 16.6 of the Constitution and the Electoral (Chairman of Dáil Éireann) Act 1937, as adapted by the Electoral (Amendment) Act 1961.)	N/A	Returned automatically	
Fianna Fáil	Patrick Hillery	37.7	12,687	
Fine Gael	William Murphy	27.0	9,066	
Fianna Fáil	Seán Ó Ceallaigh	16.3	5,494	9,246
Fine Gael	Francis Gordon	9.5	3,197	3,416
Sinn Féin	Séamus Sabhat	9.4	3,174	3,485
Electorate: 47,259 Valid: 33,618 Quota: 8,405 Turnout: 71.1%

Hogan was elected again as Ceann Comhairle on 11 October 1961, leaving the Labour parliamentary party.

=== 1959 by-election ===
Éamon de Valera was elected as President of Ireland at the 1959 presidential election, held on 17 June. The by-election was held on 22 July 1959 was won by the Fianna Fáil candidate Seán Ó Ceallaigh.

1959 by-election: Clare
Party	Candidate	FPv%	Count
Party	Candidate	FPv%	1
Fianna Fáil	Seán Ó Ceallaigh	56.1	18,154
Fine Gael	Francis Gordon	27.1	8,770
Sinn Féin	Séamus Sabhat	16.9	5,464
Electorate: 47,227 Valid: 32,388 Quota: 16,195 Turnout: 68.6%

=== 1957 general election ===
The third count occurred because there was the possibility that surplus votes of elected candidates could have resulted in another candidate reaching the threshold of a third of a quota which would have meant their election deposit was returned to them.

1957 general election: Clare
Party	Candidate	FPv%	Count		
Party	Candidate	FPv%	1	2	3
Labour	Patrick Hogan (Note: As outgoing Ceann Comhairle, Hogan was returned automatically under Art. 16.6 of the Constitution and the Electoral (Chairman of Dáil Éireann) Act 1937.)	N/A	Returned automatically		
Fianna Fáil	Éamon de Valera	44.8	16,159		
Fine Gael	William Murphy	24.9	8,976	9,149	
Fianna Fáil	Patrick Hillery	16.7	6,026	11,692	
Fine Gael	Bernard Lynch	8.6	3,115	3,229	3,459
Fianna Fáil	Seán O'Grady	5.0	1,817	2,999	5,437
Electorate: 49,180 Valid: 36,093 Quota: 9,024 Turnout: 73.4%

Hogan was elected again as Ceann Comhairle on 20 March 1957, leaving the Labour parliamentary party.

=== 1954 general election ===
1954 general election: Clare
Party	Candidate	FPv%	Count						
Party	Candidate	FPv%	1	2	3	4	5	6	7
Labour	Patrick Hogan (Note: As outgoing Ceann Comhairle, Hogan was returned automatically under Art. 16.6 of the Constitution and the Electoral (Chairman of Dáil Éireann) Act 1937.)	N/A	Returned automatically						
Fianna Fáil	Éamon de Valera	31.3	12,679						
Fine Gael	William Murphy	19.6	7,945	7,983	8,201	8,660	10,479		
Fianna Fáil	Patrick Hillery	15.3	6,189	8,082	8,295	8,783	8,871	8,891	12,698
Labour	Gerard Griffin	11.6	4,714	4,853	5,010	5,314	5,470	5,764	6,144
Fianna Fáil	Thomas O'Meara	11.3	4,582	5,010	5,103	5,145	5,185	5,222	
Fine Gael	Vincent McHugh	5.1	2,044	2,069	2,105	2,177			
Clann na Poblachta	Seán O'Connor	3.4	1,377	1,389	1,507				
Sinn Féin	Martin Whyte	2.4	979	995					
Electorate: 50,142 Valid: 40,509 Quota: 10,128 Turnout: 80.8%

Hogan was elected again as Ceann Comhairle on 2 June 1954, leaving the Labour parliamentary party.

=== 1951 general election ===
1951 general election: Clare
Party	Candidate	FPv%	Count						
Party	Candidate	FPv%	1	2	3	4	5	6	7
Fianna Fáil	Éamon de Valera	33.4	13,850						
Fine Gael	William Murphy	19.3	8,016	8,095	9,522				
Labour	Patrick Hogan	12.6	5,213	5,466	5,578	6,463	6,855	7,136	7,359
Fianna Fáil	Patrick Hillery	9.8	4,063	5,846	5,872	5,891	7,930	11,696	
Independent	Thomas Burke	9.7	4,031	4,306	4,358	4,610	5,009	5,480	7,252
Fianna Fáil	Michael Considine	6.4	2,634	3,827	3,850	3,867			
Fianna Fáil	Seán O'Grady	4.9	2,028	3,976	3,985	4,037	4,953		
Fine Gael	Vincent McHugh	4.0	1,648	1,670					
Electorate: 52,074 Valid: 41,483 Quota: 8,297 Turnout: 79.7%

Hogan was elected as Ceann Comhairle on 13 June 1951, leaving the Labour parliamentary party.

=== 1948 general election ===
1948 general election: Clare
Party	Candidate	FPv%	Count										
Party	Candidate	FPv%	1	2	3	4	5	6	7	8	9	10	11
Fianna Fáil	Éamon de Valera	30.3	12,574										
Labour	Patrick Hogan	11.1	4,586	4,923	4,976	5,071	5,156	5,321	5,620	6,614	6,848	7,272	7,580
Independent	Thomas Burke	11.0	4,576	4,768	4,809	4,862	4,982	5,171	5,929	6,715	7,131	7,873	8,467
Fianna Fáil	Patrick Shanahan	7.8	3,235	3,939	3,956	3,986	4,001	4,132	4,284	4,451	4,943		
Fianna Fáil	Seán O'Grady	7.3	3,020	5,102	5,127	5,149	5,180	5,278	5,492	5,619	7,374	10,370	
Fine Gael	Charles Burke	6.9	2,854	2,888	3,112	3,163	4,025	4,139	4,601	4,889	5,246	5,377	5,413
Fianna Fáil	Seán Brady	6.5	2,697	3,388	3,392	3,423	3,455	3,474	3,555	3,609			
Clann na Talmhan	Thomas Burke	4.9	2,042	2,111	2,148	2,175	2,225	2,365					
Clann na Poblachta	Peter O'Loughlin	4.2	1,732	1,793	1,828	2,196	2,220	3,139	3,359				
Clann na Poblachta	Thomas Lillis	3.9	1,612	1,649	1,657	1,824	1,883						
Fine Gael	Austin Brennan	2.9	1,183	1,205	1,300	1,314							
Clann na Poblachta	Timothy Smythe	2.1	851	863	886								
Fine Gael	Edward Monahan	1.3	552	582									
Electorate: 54,379 Valid: 41,514 Quota: 8,303 Turnout: 76.3%

=== 1945 by-election ===
Fine Gael TD Patrick Burke died on 7 February 1945. The by-election was held on 4 December 1945, and was won by the Fianna Fáil candidate Patrick Shanahan.

1945 by-election: Clare
Party	Candidate	FPv%	Count
Party	Candidate	FPv%	1
Fianna Fáil	Patrick Shanahan	72.2	21,526
Fine Gael	Edward Monahan	27.8	8,299
Electorate: 60,993 Valid: 29,825 Quota: 14,913 Turnout: 48.9%

=== 1944 general election ===
1944 general election: Clare
Party	Candidate	FPv%	Count				
Party	Candidate	FPv%	1	2	3	4	5
Fianna Fáil	Éamon de Valera	31.8	14,200				
Fianna Fáil	Peter O'Loghlen	13.9	6,183	8,036			
Fine Gael	Patrick Burke	13.5	6,013	6,135	6,234	6,275	7,476
Labour	Patrick Hogan	12.1	5,376	5,833	6,148	6,323	6,838
Independent	Thomas Burke	11.2	4,993	5,306	5,910	6,190	7,423
Fianna Fáil	Seán O'Grady	10.9	4,850	8,653			
Clann na Talmhan	Denis Healy	6.7	2,985	3,203	3,404	3,510	
Electorate: 62,217 Valid: 44,600 Quota: 7,434 Turnout: 71.7%

=== 1943 general election ===
Hughes, Seán Hogan and Halpin were eliminated on successive counts, but separate figures for the 3rd and 4th Counts are not available.

1943 general election: Clare
Party	Candidate	FPv%	Count											
Party	Candidate	FPv%	1	2	3	4	5	6	7	8	9	10	11	12
Fianna Fáil	Éamon de Valera	30.9	14,961											
Labour	Patrick Hogan	10.7	5,177	5,561	N/A	N/A	6,235	6,263	6,510	6,657	6,735	6,830	6,862	7,147
Fine Gael	Patrick Burke	10.2	4,926	5,028	N/A	N/A	5,340	5,513	5,612	6,369	6,731	6,796	6,807	7,901
Independent	Thomas Burke	9.6	4,637	4,966	N/A	N/A	5,232	5,367	5,645	5,983	6,251	6,368	6,413	7,834
Fianna Fáil	Seán O'Grady	8.6	4,167	7,051	N/A	N/A	7,172	7,224	7,507	7,574	7,696	9,395		
Fianna Fáil	Peter O'Loghlen	6.7	3,240	4,553	N/A	N/A	4,638	4,652	4,843	4,898	4,951	5,380	6,619	6,927
Clann na Talmhan	John Clancy	5.0	2,433	2,505	N/A	N/A	2,587	2,956	3,177	3,294	4,510	4,538	4,541	
Clann na Talmhan	William Clune	3.8	1,832	1,913	N/A	N/A	1,997	2,125	2,193	2,353				
Fine Gael	William Counihan	3.4	1,639	1,685	N/A	N/A	1,872	1,902	1,919					
Independent	John Fahy	2.8	1,376	1,583	N/A	N/A	1,632	1,637						
Fianna Fáil	Patrick McMahon	2.1	1,013	2,270	N/A	N/A	2,410	2,452	2,480	2,530	2,568			
Clann na Talmhan	Stanislaus Burke	2.0	953	987	N/A	N/A	1,019							
Fine Gael	Cormac Halpin	1.6	789	842	N/A	N/A								
Córas na Poblachta	Seán Hogan	1.5	700	786	N/A	N/A								
Labour	Joseph Hughes	1.1	543	591										
Electorate: 62,217 Valid: 48,386 Quota: 8,065 Turnout: 77.8%

=== 1938 general election ===
1938 general election: Clare
Party	Candidate	FPv%	Count					
Party	Candidate	FPv%	1	2	3	4	5	6
Fianna Fáil	Éamon de Valera	29.7	14,723					
Fianna Fáil	Seán O'Grady	14.7	7,270	11,127				
Independent	Thomas Burke	13.2	6,525	6,742	6,789	7,151	7,825	8,182
Fine Gael	Patrick Burke	12.7	6,280	6,351	6,363	7,337	7,488	7,534
Labour	Patrick Hogan	11.5	5,713	6,236	6,289	6,397	6,880	7,265
Fianna Fáil	Martin Sexton	8.7	4,305	5,003	5,427	5,577		
Fianna Fáil	Peter O'Loghlen	6.2	3,079	4,152	6,473	6,518	10,229	
Fine Gael	Edmund Carroll	3.4	1,686	1,706	1,712			
Electorate: 62,245 Valid: 49,581 Quota: 8,264 Turnout: 79.7%

=== 1937 general election ===
There is no record of any further counts, even though the difference between the votes of Hogan, the last elected candidate, and Shalloo, the runner up, after the seventh count was less than the sum of the undistributed surpluses.

1937 general election: Clare
Party	Candidate	FPv%	Count						
Party	Candidate	FPv%	1	2	3	4	5	6	7
Fianna Fáil	Éamon de Valera	28.6	14,012						
Independent	Thomas Burke	12.9	6,333	6,795	7,069	7,153	7,176	8,140	8,957
Fine Gael	Patrick Burke	12.9	6,327	6,386	7,145	7,177	7,182	7,718	10,502
Labour	Patrick Hogan	10.7	5,262	5,953	6,053	6,140	6,153	6,672	6,919
Fianna Fáil	Seán O'Grady	9.0	4,410	7,173	7,231	8,946			
Fine Gael	Bartholomew Crowley	7.8	3,807	3,865	4,173	4,182	4,183	4,245	
Independent	Patrick Houlihan	5.8	2,821	3,073	3,115	3,381	3,406		
Fianna Fáil	Thomas Shalloo	5.2	2,555	3,138	3,296	3,600	4,305	4,746	4,850
Fianna Fáil	Séamus Keely	3.6	1,764	2,707	2,716				
Fine Gael	William Murphy	3.6	1,747	1,774					
Electorate: 62,551 Valid: 49,038 Quota: 8,174 Turnout: 78.4%

=== 1933 general election ===
1933 general election: Clare
Party	Candidate	FPv%	Count					
Party	Candidate	FPv%	1	2	3	4	5	6
Fianna Fáil	Éamon de Valera	42.1	18,574					
Cumann na nGaedheal	Patrick Burke	11.9	5,254	5,334	5,335	6,762	10,574	
Labour	Patrick Hogan	9.8	4,307	6,245	6,251	6,471	6,614	7,206
National Centre Party	Patrick Baxter	9.2	4,041	4,101	4,101	4,424		
Fianna Fáil	Martin Sexton	8.2	3,618	5,426	5,440	5,475	5,647	5,985
Fianna Fáil	Patrick Houlihan	7.5	3,289	7,478				
Fianna Fáil	Seán O'Grady	7.0	3,079	6,070	6,167	6,243	6,395	6,555
Cumann na nGaedheal	Thomas Falvey	4.5	1,993	2,141	2,141			
Electorate: 55,056 Valid: 44,155 Quota: 7,360 Turnout: 80.2%

=== 1932 general election ===
1932 general election: Clare
Party	Candidate	FPv%	Count				
Party	Candidate	FPv%	1	2	3	4	5
Fianna Fáil	Éamon de Valera	30.2	12,504				
Labour	Patrick Hogan	13.8	5,701	6,875	7,058		
Fianna Fáil	Martin Sexton	13.2	5,444	6,370	6,445	6,993	
Cumann na nGaedheal	Patrick Burke	12.7	5,254	5,313	5,995	6,172	6,283
Cumann na nGaedheal	Patrick Kelly	10.4	4,301	4,346	5,064	5,188	5,235
Fianna Fáil	Seán O'Grady	9.7	4,002	5,557	5,632	8,860	
Fianna Fáil	Patrick Houlihan	5.8	2,408	4,231	4,264		
Cumann na nGaedheal	Hubert Hunt	4.3	1,783	1,805			
Electorate: 53,777 Valid: 41,397 Quota: 6,900 Turnout: 77.0%

=== September 1927 general election ===
September 1927 general election: Clare
Party	Candidate	FPv%	Count					
Party	Candidate	FPv%	1	2	3	4	5	6
Fianna Fáil	Éamon de Valera	34.3	13,902					
Cumann na nGaedheal	Patrick Kelly	13.9	5,646	5,732	5,788	5,791	7,081	
Labour	Patrick Hogan	11.6	4,683	5,724	5,916	5,937	6,068	6,653
Cumann na nGaedheal	Patrick Burke	10.4	4,201	4,298	4,308	4,310	4,800	6,074
Fianna Fáil	Martin Sexton	8.6	3,506	5,032	5,743	5,994	6,106	6,615
Fianna Fáil	Patrick Houlihan	7.4	3,003	6,569	7,040			
Farmers' Party	Thomas Falvey	6.1	2,481	2,692	2,742	2,747	2,886	
Cumann na nGaedheal	Seán O'Dea	5.3	2,136	2,171	2,197	2,199		
Fianna Fáil	John O'Dwyer	2.4	977	1,561				
Electorate: 56,910 Valid: 40,535 Quota: 6,756 Turnout: 71.2%

=== June 1927 general election ===
June 1927 general election: Clare
Party	Candidate	FPv%	Count						
Party	Candidate	FPv%	1	2	3	4	5	6	7
Fianna Fáil	Éamon de Valera	33.8	13,029						
Farmers' Party	Thomas Falvey	13.3	5,140	6,068	6,192	6,291	6,604		
Labour	Patrick Hogan	10.8	4,147	4,804	4,973	5,079	5,345	6,167	6,713
Cumann na nGaedheal	Patrick Kelly	9.4	3,612	3,688	4,186	4,221	6,033	6,506	
National League	Thomas O'Donnell	7.3	2,830	2,956	3,039	3,096	3,218	3,636	3,776
Cumann na nGaedheal	Hubert Hunt	6.2	2,382	2,422	2,696	2,715			
Independent	Denis Healy	6.1	2,368	2,653	2,742	2,788	2,852		
Fianna Fáil	Patrick Houlihan	3.9	1,500	3,720	3,749	4,750	4,772	5,452	7,531
Sinn Féin	Brian O'Higgins	3.7	1,412	2,726	2,750	3,083	3,128	3,272	
Cumann na nGaedheal	James O'Flynn	3.4	1,327	1,367					
Fianna Fáil	Seán O'Grady	2.1	799	1,717	1,744				
Electorate: 56,910 Valid: 38,546 Quota: 6,425 Turnout: 67.7%

=== 1923 general election ===
1923 general election: Clare
Party	Candidate	FPv%	Count													
Party	Candidate	FPv%	1	2	3	4	5	6	7	8	9	10	11	12	13	14
Republican	Éamon de Valera	45.0	17,762													
Cumann na nGaedheal	Eoin MacNeill	20.8	8,196													
Labour	Patrick MacNamara	5.4	2,140	2,488	2,595	2,614	2,685	2,767	2,811	2,955	3,010					
Labour	Patrick Hogan	5.3	2,083	2,731	2,809	2,845	2,860	2,923	2,986	3,130	3,213	4,910	5,216	5,573	5,732	6,510
Farmers' Party	Conor Hogan	4.9	1,914	2,692	2,833	2,882	2,915	2,998	3,135	3,268	3,787	3,965	5,410	5,853	5,974	6,961
Cumann na nGaedheal	Michael Hehir	4.6	1,809	1,992	2,414	2,477	2,487	2,651	2,700	3,245	3,331	3,617	4,031	4,258	4,267	
Farmers' Party	Batt Skehan	3.9	1,556	1,792	1,856	1,875	1,885	1,944	1,962	2,216	3,158	3,287				
Farmers' Party	Patrick Ryan	3.3	1,313	1,553	1,651	1,676	1,704	1,789	1,822	2,056						
Cumann na nGaedheal	James O'Regan	2.3	918	995	1,342	1,494	1,509	1,689	1,702							
Cumann na nGaedheal	Patrick Kelly	1.5	588	647	792	826	843									
Republican	Francis Barrett	1.2	482	2,411	2,415	2,432	2,545	2,560	3,363	3,384	3,446	3,569	3,693			
Cumann na nGaedheal	Peter O'Loughlin	0.6	237	296	465											
Republican	Michael Comyn	0.6	219	1,519	1,522	1,531	1,596	1,603								
Republican	Brian O'Higgins	0.3	114	5,035	5,070	5,077	5,206	5,240	5,584	5,619	5,700	5,895	6,066	7,943		
Republican	Thomas Honan	0.3	114	523	531	538										
Electorate: 58,495 Valid: 39,445 Quota: 6,575 Turnout: 67.4%

=== 1922 general election ===
1922 general election: Clare (uncontested)
Party	Candidate
Sinn Féin (Pro-Treaty)	Patrick Brennan
Sinn Féin (Anti-Treaty)	Éamon de Valera
Sinn Féin (Pro-Treaty)	Seán Liddy
Sinn Féin (Anti-Treaty)	Brian O'Higgins
Electorate: 46,833

Patrick Brennan resigned as a TD on 11 December 1922. Seán Liddy resigned as a TD on 18 December 1922. Both seats remained vacant until the dissolution of the 3rd Dáil on 9 August 1923.

=== 1921 general election ===
1921 general election: Clare (uncontested)
Party	Candidate
Sinn Féin	Patrick Brennan
Sinn Féin	Éamon de Valera
Sinn Féin	Seán Liddy
Sinn Féin	Brian O'Higgins
