= Martin Sexton (politician) =

Irish politician (1878–1966)

Teachta Dála
- In office September 1927 – January 1933
- Constituency: Clare

Personal details
- Born: 15 September 1878 County Clare, Ireland
- Died: 24 February 1966 (aged 87) County Clare, Ireland
- Party: Fianna Fáil

Martin Sexton (15 September 1878 – 24 February 1966) was an Irish politician. He was elected to Dáil Éireann as a Fianna Fáil Teachta Dála (TD) for the Clare constituency at the September 1927 general election. He was re-elected at the 1932 general election but lost his seat at the 1933 general election. He was an unsuccessful candidate at the 1938 general election.

| Dáil | Election | Deputy (Party) | Deputy (Party) | Deputy (Party) | Deputy (Party) | Deputy (Party) |
|---|---|---|---|---|---|---|
| 2nd | 1921 | Éamon de Valera (SF) | Brian O'Higgins (SF) | Seán Liddy (SF) | Patrick Brennan (SF) | 4 seats 1921–1923 |
| 3rd | 1922 | Éamon de Valera (AT-SF) | Brian O'Higgins (AT-SF) | Seán Liddy (PT-SF) | Patrick Brennan (PT-SF) | 4 seats 1921–1923 |
| 4th | 1923 | Éamon de Valera (Rep) | Brian O'Higgins (Rep) | Conor Hogan (FP) | Patrick Hogan (Lab) | Eoin MacNeill (CnaG) |
| 5th | 1927 (Jun) | Éamon de Valera (FF) | Patrick Houlihan (FF) | Thomas Falvey (FP) | Patrick Hogan (Lab) | Patrick Kelly (CnaG) |
| 6th | 1927 (Sep) | Éamon de Valera (FF) | Patrick Houlihan (FF) | Martin Sexton (FF) | Patrick Hogan (Lab) | Patrick Kelly (CnaG) |
| 7th | 1932 | Éamon de Valera (FF) | Seán O'Grady (FF) | Martin Sexton (FF) | Patrick Hogan (Lab) | Patrick Burke (CnaG) |
| 8th | 1933 | Éamon de Valera (FF) | Seán O'Grady (FF) | Patrick Houlihan (FF) | Patrick Hogan (Lab) | Patrick Burke (CnaG) |
| 9th | 1937 | Éamon de Valera (FF) | Seán O'Grady (FF) | Thomas Burke (FP) | Patrick Hogan (Lab) | Patrick Burke (FG) |
| 10th | 1938 | Éamon de Valera (FF) | Seán O'Grady (FF) | Thomas Burke (FP) | Peter O'Loghlen (FF) | Patrick Burke (FG) |
| 11th | 1943 | Éamon de Valera (FF) | Seán O'Grady (FF) | Thomas Burke (FP) | Patrick Hogan (Lab) | Patrick Burke (FG) |
| 12th | 1944 | Éamon de Valera (FF) | Seán O'Grady (FF) | Thomas Burke (FP) | Peter O'Loghlen (FF) | Patrick Burke (FG) |
| 12th | 1945 by-election | Éamon de Valera (FF) | Seán O'Grady (FF) | Thomas Burke (FP) | Peter O'Loghlen (FF) | Patrick Shanahan (FF) |
| 13th | 1948 | Éamon de Valera (FF) | Seán O'Grady (FF) | Thomas Burke (FP) | Patrick Hogan (Lab) | 4 seats 1948–1969 |
| 14th | 1951 | Éamon de Valera (FF) | Patrick Hillery (FF) | William Murphy (FG) | Patrick Hogan (Lab) | 4 seats 1948–1969 |
| 15th | 1954 | Éamon de Valera (FF) | Patrick Hillery (FF) | William Murphy (FG) | Patrick Hogan (Lab) | 4 seats 1948–1969 |
| 16th | 1957 | Éamon de Valera (FF) | Patrick Hillery (FF) | William Murphy (FG) | Patrick Hogan (Lab) | 4 seats 1948–1969 |
| 16th | 1959 by-election | Seán Ó Ceallaigh (FF) | Patrick Hillery (FF) | William Murphy (FG) | Patrick Hogan (Lab) | 4 seats 1948–1969 |
| 17th | 1961 | Seán Ó Ceallaigh (FF) | Patrick Hillery (FF) | William Murphy (FG) | Patrick Hogan (Lab) | 4 seats 1948–1969 |
| 18th | 1965 | Seán Ó Ceallaigh (FF) | Patrick Hillery (FF) | William Murphy (FG) | Patrick Hogan (Lab) | 4 seats 1948–1969 |
| 18th | 1968 by-election | Seán Ó Ceallaigh (FF) | Patrick Hillery (FF) | Sylvester Barrett (FF) | Patrick Hogan (Lab) | 4 seats 1948–1969 |
| 19th | 1969 | Frank Taylor (FG) | Patrick Hillery (FF) | Sylvester Barrett (FF) | 3 seats 1969–1981 | |
| 20th | 1973 | Frank Taylor (FG) | Brendan Daly (FF) | Sylvester Barrett (FF) | 3 seats 1969–1981 | |
| 21st | 1977 | Frank Taylor (FG) | Brendan Daly (FF) | Sylvester Barrett (FF) | 3 seats 1969–1981 | |
| 22nd | 1981 | Madeleine Taylor (FG) | Brendan Daly (FF) | Sylvester Barrett (FF) | Bill Loughnane (FF) | 4 seats since 1981 |
| 23rd | 1982 (Feb) | Donal Carey (FG) | Brendan Daly (FF) | Sylvester Barrett (FF) | Bill Loughnane (FF) | 4 seats since 1981 |
| 24th | 1982 (Nov) | Donal Carey (FG) | Brendan Daly (FF) | Sylvester Barrett (FF) | Madeleine Taylor-Quinn (FG) | 4 seats since 1981 |
| 25th | 1987 | Donal Carey (FG) | Brendan Daly (FF) | Síle de Valera (FF) | Madeleine Taylor-Quinn (FG) | 4 seats since 1981 |
| 26th | 1989 | Donal Carey (FG) | Brendan Daly (FF) | Síle de Valera (FF) | Madeleine Taylor-Quinn (FG) | 4 seats since 1981 |
| 27th | 1992 | Donal Carey (FG) | Moosajee Bhamjee (Lab) | Síle de Valera (FF) | Tony Killeen (FF) | 4 seats since 1981 |
| 28th | 1997 | Donal Carey (FG) | Brendan Daly (FF) | Síle de Valera (FF) | Tony Killeen (FF) | 4 seats since 1981 |
| 29th | 2002 | Pat Breen (FG) | James Breen (Ind.) | Síle de Valera (FF) | Tony Killeen (FF) | 4 seats since 1981 |
| 30th | 2007 | Pat Breen (FG) | Joe Carey (FG) | Timmy Dooley (FF) | Tony Killeen (FF) | 4 seats since 1981 |
| 31st | 2011 | Pat Breen (FG) | Joe Carey (FG) | Timmy Dooley (FF) | Michael McNamara (Lab) | 4 seats since 1981 |
| 32nd | 2016 | Pat Breen (FG) | Joe Carey (FG) | Timmy Dooley (FF) | Michael Harty (Ind.) | 4 seats since 1981 |
| 33rd | 2020 | Violet-Anne Wynne (SF) | Joe Carey (FG) | Cathal Crowe (FF) | Michael McNamara (Ind.) | 4 seats since 1981 |
| 34th | 2024 | Donna McGettigan (SF) | Joe Cooney (FG) | Cathal Crowe (FF) | Timmy Dooley (FF) | 4 seats since 1981 |
