= Edward Monahan =

Irish politician

Senator
- In office 8 September 1943 – 18 August 1944
- Constituency: Administrative Panel

Personal details
- Party: Fine Gael

Edward Monahan was an Irish Fine Gael politician. He was a member of Seanad Éireann from 1943 to 1944. He was elected to the 4th Seanad in 1943 by the Administrative Panel. He lost his seat at the 1944 Seanad election. He stood unsuccessfully for Dáil Éireann as a Fine Gael candidate for the Clare constituency at the 1945 by-election and the 1948 general election.
