= Michael Harty (politician) =

Irish former politician (born 1955)

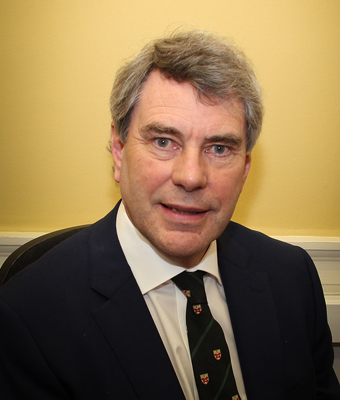
- Harty in 2016

Chair of the Committee on Health
- In office 4 April 2016 – 14 January 2020
- Preceded by: Jerry Buttimer
- Succeeded by: Seán Crowe

Teachta Dála
- In office February 2016 – February 2020
- Constituency: Clare

Personal details
- Born: 7 April 1955 (age 71) Limerick, Ireland
- Party: Independent
- Education: Royal College of Surgeons

Michael Harty (born 7 April 1955) is an Irish former independent politician who served as a Teachta Dála (TD) for the Clare constituency from 2016 to 2020.

== Career ==
A general practitioner based in Kilmihil, County Clare, he campaigned on a 'No Doctor No Village' platform to reverse the decline in the income of rural GPs.

On the election of Taoiseach in 2016, he voted for Enda Kenny as Taoiseach. He served as Chair of the Committee on Health from April 2016 to February 2020.

On 13 January 2020, he announced that he would not contest the 2020 general election.

In August 2020, he attended a golf party in County Galway which breached the COVID-19 guidelines.

Dáil	Election	Deputy (Party)	Deputy (Party)	Deputy (Party)	Deputy (Party)	Deputy (Party)
2nd	1921	Éamon de Valera (SF)	Brian O'Higgins (SF)	Seán Liddy (SF)	Patrick Brennan (SF)	4 seats 1921–1923
3rd	1922	Éamon de Valera (AT-SF)	Brian O'Higgins (AT-SF)	Seán Liddy (PT-SF)	Patrick Brennan (PT-SF)	4 seats 1921–1923
4th	1923	Éamon de Valera (Rep)	Brian O'Higgins (Rep)	Conor Hogan (FP)	Patrick Hogan (Lab)	Eoin MacNeill (CnaG)
5th	1927 (Jun)	Éamon de Valera (FF)	Patrick Houlihan (FF)	Thomas Falvey (FP)	Patrick Hogan (Lab)	Patrick Kelly (CnaG)
6th	1927 (Sep)	Éamon de Valera (FF)	Patrick Houlihan (FF)	Martin Sexton (FF)	Patrick Hogan (Lab)	Patrick Kelly (CnaG)
7th	1932	Éamon de Valera (FF)	Seán O'Grady (FF)	Martin Sexton (FF)	Patrick Hogan (Lab)	Patrick Burke (CnaG)
8th	1933	Éamon de Valera (FF)	Seán O'Grady (FF)	Patrick Houlihan (FF)	Patrick Hogan (Lab)	Patrick Burke (CnaG)
9th	1937	Éamon de Valera (FF)	Seán O'Grady (FF)	Thomas Burke (FP)	Patrick Hogan (Lab)	Patrick Burke (FG)
10th	1938	Éamon de Valera (FF)	Seán O'Grady (FF)	Thomas Burke (FP)	Peter O'Loghlen (FF)	Patrick Burke (FG)
11th	1943	Éamon de Valera (FF)	Seán O'Grady (FF)	Thomas Burke (FP)	Patrick Hogan (Lab)	Patrick Burke (FG)
12th	1944	Éamon de Valera (FF)	Seán O'Grady (FF)	Thomas Burke (FP)	Peter O'Loghlen (FF)	Patrick Burke (FG)
12th	1945 by-election	Éamon de Valera (FF)	Seán O'Grady (FF)	Thomas Burke (FP)	Peter O'Loghlen (FF)	Patrick Shanahan (FF)
13th	1948	Éamon de Valera (FF)	Seán O'Grady (FF)	Thomas Burke (FP)	Patrick Hogan (Lab)	4 seats 1948–1969
14th	1951	Éamon de Valera (FF)	Patrick Hillery (FF)	William Murphy (FG)	Patrick Hogan (Lab)	4 seats 1948–1969
15th	1954	Éamon de Valera (FF)	Patrick Hillery (FF)	William Murphy (FG)	Patrick Hogan (Lab)	4 seats 1948–1969
16th	1957	Éamon de Valera (FF)	Patrick Hillery (FF)	William Murphy (FG)	Patrick Hogan (Lab)	4 seats 1948–1969
16th	1959 by-election	Seán Ó Ceallaigh (FF)	Patrick Hillery (FF)	William Murphy (FG)	Patrick Hogan (Lab)	4 seats 1948–1969
17th	1961	Seán Ó Ceallaigh (FF)	Patrick Hillery (FF)	William Murphy (FG)	Patrick Hogan (Lab)	4 seats 1948–1969
18th	1965	Seán Ó Ceallaigh (FF)	Patrick Hillery (FF)	William Murphy (FG)	Patrick Hogan (Lab)	4 seats 1948–1969
18th	1968 by-election	Seán Ó Ceallaigh (FF)	Patrick Hillery (FF)	Sylvester Barrett (FF)	Patrick Hogan (Lab)	4 seats 1948–1969
19th	1969	Frank Taylor (FG)	Patrick Hillery (FF)	Sylvester Barrett (FF)	3 seats 1969–1981	
20th	1973	Frank Taylor (FG)	Brendan Daly (FF)	Sylvester Barrett (FF)	3 seats 1969–1981	
21st	1977	Frank Taylor (FG)	Brendan Daly (FF)	Sylvester Barrett (FF)	3 seats 1969–1981	
22nd	1981	Madeleine Taylor (FG)	Brendan Daly (FF)	Sylvester Barrett (FF)	Bill Loughnane (FF)	4 seats since 1981
23rd	1982 (Feb)	Donal Carey (FG)	Brendan Daly (FF)	Sylvester Barrett (FF)	Bill Loughnane (FF)	4 seats since 1981
24th	1982 (Nov)	Donal Carey (FG)	Brendan Daly (FF)	Sylvester Barrett (FF)	Madeleine Taylor-Quinn (FG)	4 seats since 1981
25th	1987	Donal Carey (FG)	Brendan Daly (FF)	Síle de Valera (FF)	Madeleine Taylor-Quinn (FG)	4 seats since 1981
26th	1989	Donal Carey (FG)	Brendan Daly (FF)	Síle de Valera (FF)	Madeleine Taylor-Quinn (FG)	4 seats since 1981
27th	1992	Donal Carey (FG)	Moosajee Bhamjee (Lab)	Síle de Valera (FF)	Tony Killeen (FF)	4 seats since 1981
28th	1997	Donal Carey (FG)	Brendan Daly (FF)	Síle de Valera (FF)	Tony Killeen (FF)	4 seats since 1981
29th	2002	Pat Breen (FG)	James Breen (Ind.)	Síle de Valera (FF)	Tony Killeen (FF)	4 seats since 1981
30th	2007	Pat Breen (FG)	Joe Carey (FG)	Timmy Dooley (FF)	Tony Killeen (FF)	4 seats since 1981
31st	2011	Pat Breen (FG)	Joe Carey (FG)	Timmy Dooley (FF)	Michael McNamara (Lab)	4 seats since 1981
32nd	2016	Pat Breen (FG)	Joe Carey (FG)	Timmy Dooley (FF)	Michael Harty (Ind.)	4 seats since 1981
33rd	2020	Violet-Anne Wynne (SF)	Joe Carey (FG)	Cathal Crowe (FF)	Michael McNamara (Ind.)	4 seats since 1981
34th	2024	Donna McGettigan (SF)	Joe Cooney (FG)	Cathal Crowe (FF)	Timmy Dooley (FF)	4 seats since 1981
