= Kiltalown House =

Georgian house near Jobstown, County Dublin, Ireland

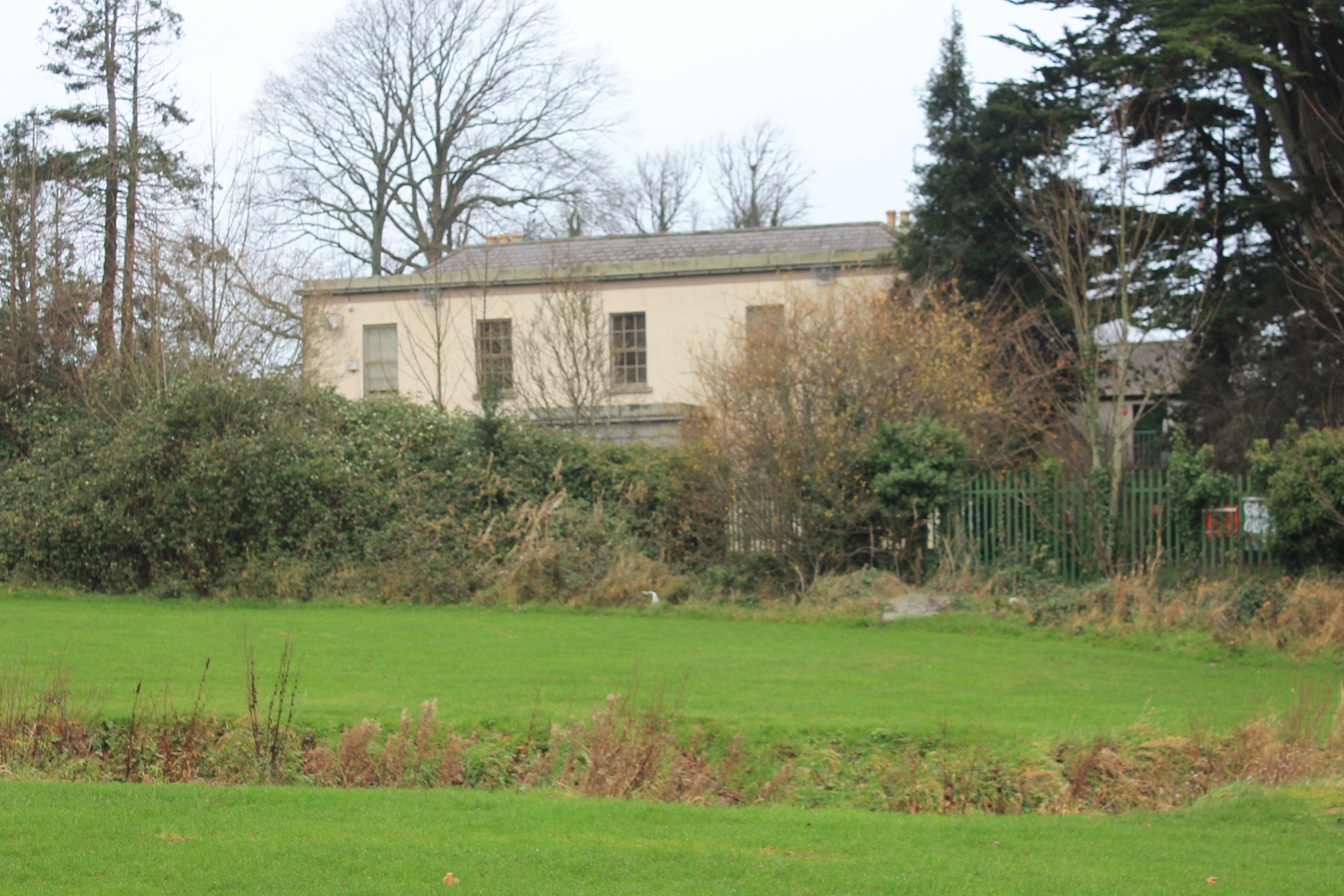
- The house in winter

- Location within Dublin

General information
- Type: House
- Architectural style: Georgian
- Location: Blessington Road; Dublin 24; D24 X59C, Jobstown, Dublin, Ireland
- Coordinates: 53.27564°N 6.40283°W
- Current tenants: Tallaght Rehabilitation Project CLG, (and) Tallaght Jobstown Adult Education Centre
- Estimated completion: c.1800
- Owner: South Dublin County Council

Dimensions
- Diameter: Five-bay, two-storey
- Other dimensions: 500mm-thick walls

Technical details
- Material: random uncoursed rubble granite jointed with a lime mortar
- Floor count: 2

Design and construction
- Designations: Protected structure (including out-houses and gateway)

Website
- https://www.tallaghtrehabproject.ie/

Kiltalown House is a late 18th / early 19th century Georgian house located in the townland of Kiltalown (Irish: Coillte Leamháin, meaning 'woods of elm' or 'the church of the elms'') near Jobstown in Tallaght, situated at the foot of the Dublin Mountains in Dublin, Ireland. Since 2005, the house has been used by a drug and alcohol rehabilitation organisation as their local community headquarters.

The house was built c.1800 at a time when Tallaght was still just a small village on the outskirts of Dublin city, and the lands around it primarily agricultural. The house went through a number of owners through the decades, with the last private owner being a Mr. W. Jolley in early 1987. Around May 1987, the house came into use in a public capacity, possibly as the result of having been purchased by Dublin County Council, and began to be used as a location for counselling services. It suffered dereliction at some point during this transition of ownership, and was damaged by fire in January 1988. The house was repaired by FÁS and subsequently used as a base for unemployed people, and then a holistic therapy centre, before being requisitioned as the headquarters of a local drug and alcohol rehabilitation organisation in July 2005, by whom it is still used today. The surviving demesne lands which surround the house have been repurposed as a public park named Kiltalown Park.

In 2002, the house was described by architectural historian Michael Fewer as "one of the few smaller country houses around Tallaght to (have) survive(d) the sweeping developments of the 1970s and 1980s". It has also been described as an "oasis of peace and tranquillity" in an otherwise urban environment, and retains a "rural charm alien to the helter-skelter of suburban life".

== Pre-history ==
=== Cist grave ===
The earliest evidence of human activity in the Kiltalown area dates from the Bronze Age (c.2400-500BC).

In June 1848, John Lentaigne presented to the Royal Irish Academy "some portions of a skeleton, an urn, and a fragment of another, all found on the townland of Kiltalown, close to the boundary of Killinarden". The remains had been found the previous week by a tenant of the land, named Mr. Quin, who had been clearing furze at the time.

In his book The Bronze Age Burials of Ireland (1990), John Waddell noted that bowl and skeletal remains had been unearthed "under a low mound" in the Kiltalown townland. A large stone-lined pit containing cremated bones was also found nearby.

In 1848, an intact urn, as well as a fragment of a larger one, were uncovered in the townland of Kiltalown "near the top of the ridge of Tallaght Hill." The finds were stored in the National Museum, Dublin as of 1877. Handcock described the intact urn, No. 93, as "a perfect and highly decorated bowl-shaped vessel, probably a food-holder. The ornamentation consists of vertical, horizontal, and wavy lines".

=== Standing stone ===
Kiltalown is the site of one of only four standing stones in the area of South Dublin. The stone is located 150m to the south-west of the house in Kiltalown Park, but is today only a stump. In May 1996, Brian Hayes, a Fine Gael politician, noted that the standing stone was "between 5,000 and 6,000 years old", and that the "inclination and axis of the stone point(ed) to 19 extensive monuments recently found on Tallaght Hill." Minister of State at the Department of Arts, Culture and the Gaeltacht, Donal Carey explained further:

The second item is a granite standing stone, just over one metre in height, which is located west of Kiltalown House in an area where there are a number of Bronze Age burials. It is positioned similarly to the nearest standing stones at Boherboy, that is, on relatively level grassland at the base of the foothills.

The stone was knocked over in October 1996 ("a recent incident of vandalism resulted in the displacement of the stone"), with it becoming "apparent that it had been sitting on its flat base with no evidence for a socket". The stone was excavated in February 1997, but "nothing of an archaeological nature was found, which might suggest that it was a boundary marker", according to the South Dublin County Development Plan 2022-2028. Rónán Swan of Arch-Tech Ltd., who carried out the excavation at the time, had the following notes:

The excavation programme was carried out in February 1997. A single cutting measuring 3.5m by 4m was manually excavated around the standing stone. The sod layer was removed, revealing a reddish-brown ploughsoil 0.1–0.2m thick. Below this ploughsoil the surface of the natural deposits was revealed. In order to verify these natural deposits, a test-pit was excavated in the centre of the cutting, to a depth of 0.3m. There was no indication of any archaeological deposits or features associated with the standing stone. Thus there is no evidence to suggest that this standing stone is of archaeological significance.

The website megalithicmonumentsofireland.com catalogued the stone in 2012, noting the following information:

This standing stone now lies recumbent in the grounds of Kilalown House, just off the Blessington road. It is almost covered over in grass and soil and a large portion has been broken off. It measures about 1.6m in length and is composed of granite.

The website themodernantiquarian.com reviewed the stone in 2014, noting that the letters KC R.I.P. had been etched into it very deeply, presumably as a memorial to a deceased person.

=== Kiltalown church ===
A church originally existed on the site of Kiltalown House, but the "foundations were removed" in the early 19th century to facilitate construction of the house.

In the 1997 article "The Medieval Parish Churches of South-West County Dublin", Máirín Ní Mharcaigh noted that the parish of Tallaght comprised 21,868 acres, being by far the largest in the area. The next largest parish in south-west County Dublin was that of Clondalkin with 4,934 acres. The Tallaght parish possessed a central "parish church" at Tallaght village and then "subsidiary churches" at Killinarden, Killininny, Kilmesantan (succeeded by Templeogue), Kilnamanagh and Kiltalown.

Ní Mharcaigh noted that these ordinary parish churches had (by 1997) been overlooked by academia, and that "many of these buildings have already been lost through neglect and vandalism and it is desirable that a detailed record should be made of those remaining before they also disappear". The small parish churches, such as that at Kiltalown, were, for the most part, "small and rather plain and did not always reflect fashionable architectural styles."

Ní Mharcaigh noted that "surviving architectural features (were) relatively sparse" amongst the medieval parish churches of the region, and that "few of the churches survived in use to the end of the seventeenth century", meaning that Kiltalown church may have already been a ruin by the time it was demolished, and upon which Kiltalown House was constructed:

Plague, famines and intermittent warfare depleted the population, with consequent effect on their churches, but the advent of the Reformation in the sixteenth century was responsible for the end of many of them. Parishes with few parishioners (and many recusants) were unable to support the churches; they were united with other parishes and their churches fell into disuse. In all of the subsidiary churches, and in the parish churches of Ballyfermot, Kilbride and Kilmahuddrick, liturgical services had ceased by 1615, or the churches had been abandoned. Cruagh, Esker, Palmerston, Saggart and the chancel of Lucan were ruinous by 1630. Of the remainder, there is no further record. Most of the subsidiary churches and some of the parish churches have disappeared almost entirely without trace. Of the eighteen parish churches and eleven other churches, only the church of Newcastle is still in use."

In his 1985 work, All Roads Lead to Tallaght, archaeologist Paddy Healy noted the existence of the original church, claiming that its foundations had been "torn up" around 1822 "for the purpose of building":

There was an old church here which was mentioned also by O'Curry in 1837. Not a vestige then survived, the foundations having been torn up fifteen years earlier for the purpose of building by a Mr. Carpenter of Dublin. Unfortunately, O'Curry did not record exactly where this church stood, but since the house built by Mr. Carpenter, Kiltalown House, is still standing it was probably somewhere close to it.

=== Holy well ===
As of 1904, a well named 'St. Paul's well' existed in the townland of Kiltalown, as noted by academic Francis Elrington Ball in his A History of the County of Dublin (Part Third).

A holy well is known to exist in the adjacent townland of Killinardan, as identified in the South Dublin County Development Plan 2004-2010.

=== Pale ditch / medieval enclosure ===
A linear earthwork runs along the southern boundary of Kiltalown House in "varying states of preservation" that has been noted by the National Monuments Service to resemble that of the Pale ditch (constructed between 1499 to 1494) as similarly identified elsewhere in South County Dublin.

Since the time of the Norman invasion of Ireland, the region of south County Dublin closest to the Dublin Mountains had been associated with defensive earthworks and castles due to "its proximity to Irish attackers who used the Dublin foothills and the Wicklow Mountains (the same mountain range as the Dublin mountains) as their base."

In May 1996, Brian Hayes, a Fine Gael politician, noted that there had been two major and recent archaeological finds in Kiltalown "in the last year" which had come to the attention of the National Monuments Service, one being the Pale ditch, "180 metres long", and the other being Kiltalown standing stone. The sites had been brought to the attention of the National Monuments Service by a heritage awareness group in Tallaght. Donal Carey, explained more regarding the finds:

The first is a linear earthwork in two sections which is similar in form to the sections of the Pale ditch identified at Balally and Ballyogan in South County Dublin. It is characteristically located at the foot of the Dublin Mountains. This accords with the account given by Ball. There is a local tradition in Tallaght that the Pale ditch ran through the grounds of the Dominican Priory in the village (Tallaght village). It is probable that it continued further west as there was a castle at Jobstown in 1654 and Kiltalown House was built on the site of an early church.

A survey and small-scale excavation of a tree-lined earthwork at Kiltalown House was carried out in March 1998, after having been reported to the National Monuments and Historic Properties Service in early 1996 by a local study association named the 'Heritage Awareness Group'. The aim of the work was to establish the archaeological significance of the earthwork, and ascertain whether it might have been part of the Pale boundary earthwork, before the proposed widening of the Tallaght-Blessington road (part of the N81), which runs along its southern part, was carried out.

Excavations uncovered a "posthole on the top of the bank which suggest(ed) evidence for a timber palisade" having possibly existed there. In summary, the excavation notes revealed that:

The Kiltalown earthwork belongs to the late medieval tradition of protective enclosure that reaches its apogee in the attempted enclosure of the English Pale in 1494–5, and the identification of it as part of the Pale is a reasonable one, but it may equally have enclosed an area of medieval parkland.

In the draft landscape character assessment (LCA) of South Dublin County commissioned in 2021 as part of the South Dublin County Development Plan 2022-2028, it was noted that "excavations at Kiltalown uncovered a late medieval earthwork interpreted by the excavator as a likely stretch of the Pale boundary" but could alternatively have been remnants of "enclosure features of medieval parkland."

==== Heritage park feasibility ====
In 1996, the feasibility of developing a heritage park at Kiltalown was considered, in light of recent archaeological finds, and ongoing lack of community morale and chronic need of employment in the area. The subject was raised in the Houses of the Oireachtas.

Donal Carey explained that while there were "an estimated 150,000 archaeological sites and monuments in the State", only a select number could be presented to the public, and while the monuments in question were "of importance, the National Monuments Service ha(d) no plans to develop a heritage park at this location." He noted, however, that the National Monuments Service would be supportive of any initiative which would preserve the monuments in situ.

Carey also noted that he was "aware of plans by South Dublin County Council (by then recently established in 1994 as part of the Local Government (Dublin) Act 1993) to sell the lands to the north and west of the monuments to facilitate a private housing development. The local group is opposed to this and wants the lands preserved as a park. In the council's plans for housing there would be a green area which would preserve the standing stone but only part of the Pale ditch." The National Monuments Service was concerned to ensure that the two sites (the standing stone and the Pale ditch) were protected.

== Kiltalown House ==
=== Kiltalown townland ===
In the 1330s, the townland of Kiltalown was known as 'Killowan', according to contemporary deeds recovered by academic Liam Price. According to Price, the Bulkeley (owners of nearby Old Bawn House) estate deeds referred to it as "Killowan alias Kiltalowan."

=== Architecture ===
In 2002, the Irish National Inventory of Architectural Heritage (NIAH) summarised Kiltalown House with the following assessment:

Detached five-bay two-storey former country house, c.1800, now in use as an educational centre. Smooth rendered walls with raised quoins, carved stone eaves course and parapet. Portico with paired granite Doric columns and full entablature. Glazed timber panelled door with segmental-arched fanlight and carved timber surround. Timber sash windows. Hipped slate roof with smooth rendered chimney stacks. Two-storey lean-to section to rere (sic) and single-storey extensions to north and south sides.

The Appraisal section of the NIAH entry reads: "An imposing, elegant house with some fine features, particularly the windows, portico and doorway, enhanced by its setting in mature grounds." An un-dated entry on the website Ask About Ireland described the house with the following summary, presumably taking their information from the NIAH entry: (note: Jobstown was incorrectly identified as the townland in which the house sits)

Kiltalown House is an elegant country house situated on the Blessington Road in the townland of Jobstown. Kiltalown has some fine features, particularly the windows, portico and doorway. The portico has a pair of Doric columns and full entablature, and the doorway has a carved timber surround with fanlight. Kilatalown has a hipped slate roof and extensions and barns / outbuildings at the side - to the rere of the house. It is in use today as an holistic health centre.

Architect Feargal Ó Suilleabháin MRIAI, who was employed by South Dublin County Council in 2013 to report on conservation works which had been carried out on the building, noted that the house was built "around 1810", attached to "an older elongated rectangular farmhouse which probably dates from the seventeenth century but may be older", continuing:

The site of the house is on a slight elevation with its main façade facing due south-east towards the hills of Tallaght... Many of the house's original and early features have been retained including several sash windows and the entrance doorway with a fanlight and console above. One of the most impressive features of the house is the granite entrance portico and doorway with its massive Doric columns. Inside the house, many of the original doors and windows have been maintained and repaired, and many new modern doors have also been added. A small amount of the early drawn glass still also survives in some of the windows from the mid-20th century. This building has been modified a lot and is the product of many stages of development.

== Ownership ==
The webpage of the Tallaght Rehabilitation Project includes a paragraph entitled 'Our Story' in which the names of former owners of the house are noted: "In the past Kiltalown House has had many tenants. The house and lands were only owned by four people over the years, James Robinson, Joseph T. Pratt, John Robinson and W. Jolley. The Jolley family was the last dynasty to inhabit the house. Mr. W. Jolley bought the land and house from the Robinson's and lived there until 1987."

The first name that can be attributed to the house is that of "James Jackson, Esquire" from 1814.

=== Jackson era ===
In Ambrose Leet's 1814 publication "A Directory To The Market Towns, Villages, Gentlemen's Seats And Other Noted Places in Ireland", the resident at Kiltalown was noted as being one James Jackson, Esquire.

At the Spring and Summer Assizes for the County of Dublin some years previously in 1807, 'James Jackson, Esquire', had been awarded sums of money for keeping the road from Dublin to Blessington maintained. Some of these lands were noted as having been adjacent to the lands of "Kiltaloan" (aka Kiltalown):

Presentments passed by Grand Juries of Ireland (County of Dublin - Spring Assizes 1807)
Barony of Uppercross	£	s.	d.	Ref:
To James Jackson, esq. being so much expended by him in keeping in repair and free from nuisances for one year, commencing Easter term, one thousand eight hundred and six, the necessary parts of six hundred perches of the road from Dublin to Blessington, beginning at the four mile stone, and ending at Jobstown ford.	15	0	0	
James Jackson, esq. & Thomas Newman, to repair sixteen feet wide, one hundred and twelve perches of the road from Dublin to Blessington, between Carroll's garden-ditch on the lands of Kiltaloan, in the parish of Tallaght, and the widow Matthews stable, on the lands of Corballis, in the parish of Tallaght; the gravel to be drawn from the quarry or pit on the townland of Moreloan, now occupied by Thomas Newman.	48	1	4	

=== Robinson era ===
By 1837, it is known that a man named John Robinson was living at Kiltalown House.

This man, John Robinson II (c.1801-1872), had been presumably born at 24 Usher's Quay where his father John Robinson I (c.1771-1838) was a merchant at that location. John II's younger brother, the Rev. William H. Robinson (c.1803-1887), came to serve as the vicar for the parish of Tallaght for 57 years, living at the vicarage in Tallaght, demonstrating another close family link with the area through the mid-1800s.

In his A Topographical Dictionary of Ireland in 1837, Samuel Lewis included a passing mention of Kiltalown in his 'Tallaght' section, during which it was noted that Kiltalown House was being occupied by one "J. Robinson, Esq" at the time (John Robinson II). In June 1848, John Lentaigne noted that John Robinson, Esq. was the landowner of Kiltalown. Also in 1848, John Robinson "of Kiltalown, Tallaght", as well as his brother the Rev. William Robinson "of Glebe House, Tallaght" were listed amongst the committee members of the Irish Homœopathic Society in one of their publications.

In the 1852 edition of Thom's Irish Almanac and Official Directory, it was noted that John Robinson, esquire, (John Robinson II), of Kiltalown, was one of the magistrates who was attending the petty sessions every alternate Wednesday. Robinson was also noted as being a justice of the peace ("J.P."). In April 1853, Robinsons' son John Domville Robinson (John Robinson III) was proposed as a candidate for admission as a member of the Royal Dublin Society at one of their monthly meetings for the 'Promotion of Husbandry and other Useful Arts in Ireland'. His membership was proposed by vice president Sir W. Betham (who died later that year), and seconded by W. Barker, M.D. (Doctor of Medicine).

In the 1857 edition of Thom's, John Domville Robinson's name was listed, wherein it noted that he was residing separately at Kiltalown, as well as at No. 13 Mountjoy Street in Dublin city centre. As of 1879, he was recorded as living at 15 Upper Mountjoy Street.

==== Hackney fares to Kiltalown ====
Included in the 1857 Thom's was a table of agreed mileage fares which hackney carriages and cabriolets were permitted to charge their passengers for journeys within a radius of ten statute miles of the General Post Office on Sackville Street, Dublin. Fares were divided into two fare types; those of Fare 1 - "Not returning with Employer", and Fare 2 - "Returning with Employer, the delay not to exceed 30 minutes". The dual fares to Kiltalown House, as well as its nearest neighbours (in order of closest to the GPO to farthest), are detailed in the table below:

Mileage Fares for Hackney Carriages and Cabriolets, from or to any part of the Municipal Borough of Dublin; to or from any of the following places:
Places	Distance from the GPO			Fares		Ref:
—	M.	F.	P.	1.	2.	—
Jobstown House, near Tallaght	8	4	20	4s. 6d.	5s. 10d.	
Killinardan House, near Tallaght	9	0	0	4s. 6d.	6s. 0d.	
Kiltalown House, near Tallaght	9	0	0	4s. 6d.	6s. 0d.	
Johnville, near Saggart	9	6	0	5s. 0d.	6s. 6d.	

On 3 March 1859, it is recorded that John Domville Robinson, Esquire, "barrister-at-law, only son of Jno (John) Robinson, Esq, of Kiltalown, County Dublin" married Frances Deborah, "the only daughter of the late Edward Butler, Esq, of Carlow" at St. Peter's Church, Aungier Street in Dublin.

In the 1857 edition of Thom's, John Robinson (either John Robinson II or III) was by then recorded as: "Robinson, John, esq. J.P. and P.L.G. Kiltalown, Tallaght", with PLG meaning 'Poor Law Guardian'.

==== Political allegiance ====
In the 1865 United Kingdom general election, John Domville Robinson voted for the Irish Conservative candidate Ion Trant Hamilton in the election for the constituency of the County of Dublin.

=== Fenian Rising of 1867 ===
During the Fenian Rising of 1867, a substantial encounter occurred in Tallaght, later to be known as the Battle of Tallaght, in which thousands of members of the Irish Republican Brotherhood assembled on Tallaght Hill (above Kiltalown House) preparing for a large scale rebellion in the city below, in which they hoped to overthrow British power in Ireland.

William Domville Handcock, in his 1877 book The History and Antiquities of Tallaght in the County of Dublin, noted that his uncle was living in Kiltalown at the time (presumably the townland, not Kiltalown House itself), and relayed how "the family were in a great fright. They saw numbers of Fenians walking about the lawn all night, and they expected to be attacked every moment. All had disappeared by morning; but in the plantations near the house nearly a cart-load of rifles and ammunition was found. Next day we got a fine pike-head and a neat little dagger, as souvenirs of the latest, and, as I hope, the last, rebellion in Ireland."

=== Late nineteenth century ===
On 5 April 1869, Margaret Martha, eldest daughter of John Robinson (II), died at Kiltalown.

John Robinson II himself died on 11 October 1872, aged 71, also at Kiltalown, and Letters of Administration of his personal estate (including effects under £4,000) were subsequently granted at the Principal Registry to his wife "Eliza Robinson of Kiltalown, aforesaid the Widow and a Legatee."

According to transcribed records of the tombstones and burials in St. Maelruain's church in Tallaght, carried out in 1986, the family vault of the Robinson's bore the following inscription:

Family Vault of
John Robinson ESQ. JR.
of Kyltalown in This Parish

According to the genealogical journal The Hollingsworth Register, the words on the vault read "Family Vault of John Robinson, J.P. of Killalown (sic) in this Parish".

In 1877, the house, and local surrounds were described by William Domville Handcock in the following excerpt from his publication The History and Antiquities of Tallaght:

Near Jobstown is Killinardan, where there were the remains of a small old church. A little further up the road is Kiltalown, the residence of the late J. Robinson, J.P., who built a handsome house here, in front of a very old one formerly owned by a Mr. Carpenter. The ruins of another church remained on these lands, until demolished in 1820 by Mr. Carpenter. He was a partner in the firm of Bolton, Humphreys, & Co., of Dublin. Ben Bradley, father of the redoubtable Tom Bradley, also lived in this neighbourhood, at a place called Marfield, near Kiltipper (..) About a mile further, on the left-hand side of the road to Blessington, is Johnville, formerly the residence of Mr. Roe, who made a very pretty garden, which sloped down the hill.

As of 1879, John Domville Robinson (John Robinson III)'s address was noted as being at 15 Upper Mountjoy Street.

=== Jolley era ===
According to an article in the Tallaght Echo, William Jolley bought the property in 1885.

From 1888 until 1932, the Dublin and Blessington Steam Tramway passed by the house on its southern side. The tram ran on the site of the modern N81 road, which hugs the boundary wall of Kiltalown Park (then part of Kiltalown House), and is the main Dublin to West Wicklow road. In August 1895, the naturalist Nathaniel Colgan, writing in The Irish Naturalist, noted the presence of the orchid habenaria chlorantha in the 'three mountain districts' of County Dublin, proposing that:

This is, no doubt, the species recorded by Wade in his Catalogue of Dublin Plants (1794) under Habenaria bifolia as found "at Stagstown" (Ticknock) and "between Lugmore and Kilty-loones" (Kiltalown).

==== 1901 census ====
On the night of 31 March 1901, a census was carried out across the island of Ireland. Seven houses were recorded in the Kiltalown townland, of which four were headed by men with 'Farmer' listed as their profession. No house was occupied that evening by a person with the surname of Robinson. Two of the houses were occupied by families with the surname of Jolley / Jolly. It is not known if these two families were related.

Robert Jolley, a 58 year old farmer and widower, was noted as being the head of one household at Kiltalown, where he lived alongside his two sons Christopher (born c.1870) and James (born 1873), their respective wives, and three grandchildren. John Gallagher, a 30 year old unmarried male, lived with the family as a servant, and "dairy boy". The Jolley family members were noted as being of the Episcopal faith, whereas Gallagher was listed as a Roman Catholic.

The other Jolly household was headed by Samuel Jolly, a Dublin-born 25-year-old of the Church of England faith with a listed occupation of 'Caretaker'. Jolly was living at the house with his 26-year-old wife Katie and their one year old daughter Mary Anne.

==== 1904 ====
In 1904, Francis Elrington Ball's publication A History of the County of Dublin - Part Third detailed the history of Jobstown from the year 1266 to 1904, but did not mention Kiltalown House or its inhabitants at the time.

==== 1911 census ====
Ten years after the previous census, on the night of 2 April 1911, the 1911 census of Ireland was carried out. Seven houses were again recorded in Kiltalown, of which two were occupied by families with the surname Jolley.

Robert Jolley, the same individual as in 1901, was recorded this time as a 73-year-old farmer and widower (despite the fact that he was recorded as being 58 only a decade prior). Also occupying the household were his second-born son James, his wife, their child and a servant.

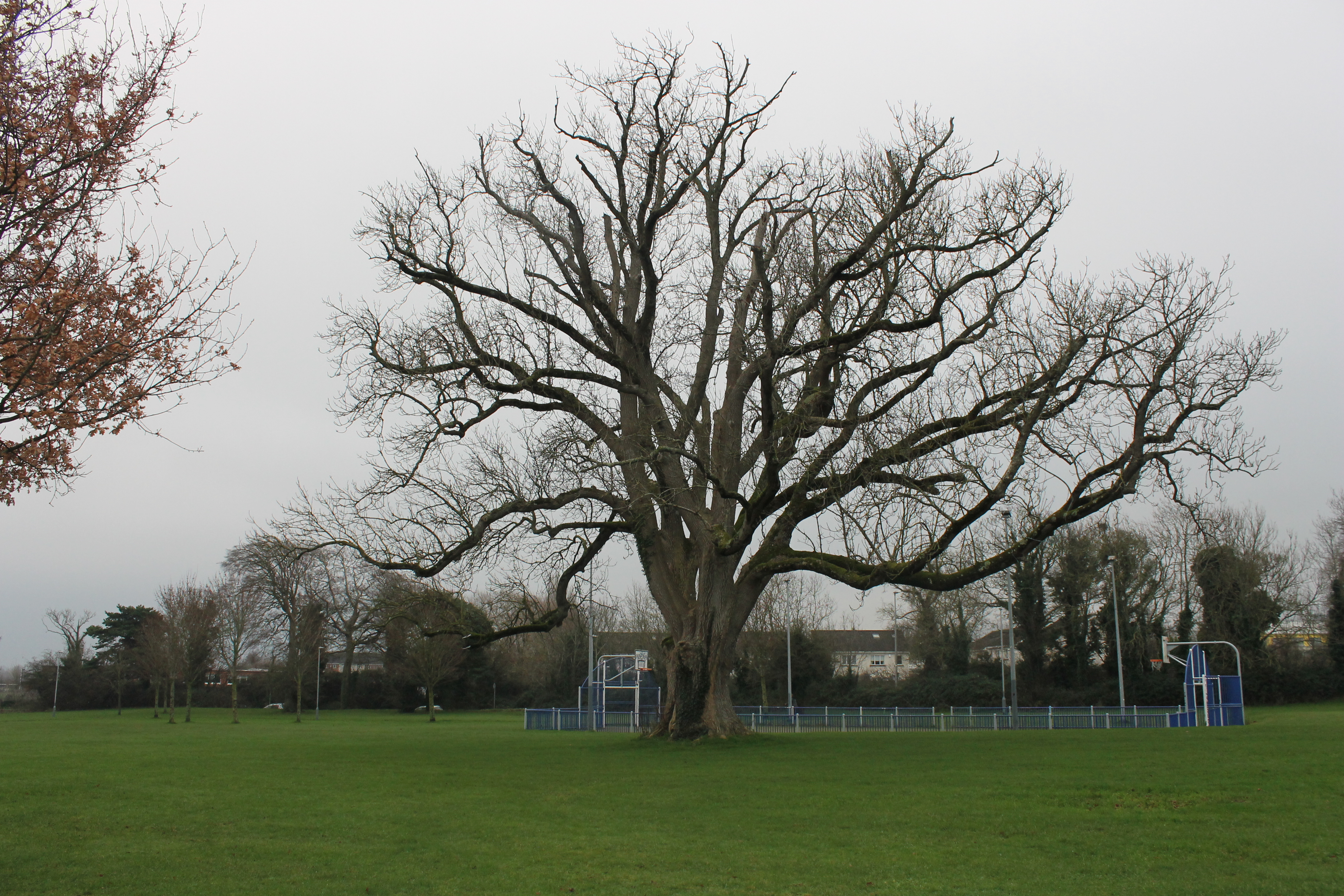
Mature tree in Kiltalown Park, in front of the house

Robert's first-born son Christopher, now 40 and living independently, was noted as being the head of the other Jolley household in Kiltalown, along with his wife Annie and their five children. Christopher R Jolley's profession was noted as 'dairy proprietor'. Two male 'farm servants' were also listed as being in the house too.

==== 1912 onwards ====
James S. Jolley (James Sutton Jolley), the second son of Robert Jolley was listed in the "All Ireland Motor Directory for 1914-15", which included the names and addresses of car owners in Ireland. James Jolley, then aged around 41, was listed in the publication with an address at Kiltalown House, Tallaght, Co. Dublin. On 9 April 1915, J. S. Jolley was again listed as living at Kiltalown House when he filed a patent in the United Kingdom (a union to which Ireland still belonged at the time) for an improvement relating to farming ploughs.

Robert Jolley died on 15 April 1915 aged 78, leaving the administration of his estate to one William Jolley (possibly his son William Valentine Jolley I (1880-1969)):

Administration of the Estate of Robert Jolley late of Kiltalown, Tallaght, County Dublin, Farmer, who died 15 April 1915 granted at Dublin to William Jolley, Dairy Proprietor, Effects £1,736 5s 11d. Resworn £3,636 5s 11d.

Robert Jolley left £4,000 in personal estate, and was buried, alongside his wife Maryanne Sutton (who predeceased him by 21 years), 14 km east of the house at Kilternan. William Jolley I and wife lived at Blackrock, Dublin from 1905 to 1912, at a house with two cow sheds, a barn and a dairy, and subsequently at Churchtown from 1927 to 1958. In June 1918, the Jolley family advertised to sell acres of land surrounding the house at auction.

William Valentine Jolley I had six sons, the third of which was named after him. William Valentine Jolley II (1912-1986) married Josephine Walker in 1942, had four children, and died on 24 March 1986. This man may be the "Mr. W. Jolley" listed as being the last private owner of Kiltalown House in 1987. His wife Josephine subsequently married again to an Edward A H Wilkinson circa 1988.

In July 1930, one of the Jolleys of Kiltalown died aged 29 of pneumonia in New Zealand.

In 1934, tenders were invited from interested construction companies for the construction of council houses across sites 40-45 at Kiltalown. This was advertised in The Irish Builder and Engineer magazine.

==== 1970 onwards ====
In February 1972, it was reported that an outline application was being made for residential development at Kiltalown House by Crosspan Developments Limited. In August 1974, a public notice of compulsory acquisition of land was advertised in the Irish Press, noting that Dublin County Council was exercising its powers under the Dublin County Council Compulsory Purchase (Fortunestown) Order 1974, and seizing over 41 acres of agricultural land at Kiltalown. Miss Aileen Patricia Jolley and Mrs. Agnes Carey were noted as occupying Kiltalown House at the time.

By 1985, the house was in use as a holistic health centre. That same year, Tallaght Youth Service initiated a project whereby young unemployed people from the local area were tasked with conducting a ground survey of the graves and graveyard at St. Maelruain's church in Tallaght centre in order to provide them with "work experience which would help them gain permanent employment". Their findings were published in a booklet in 1986, which also explored the history of the wider Tallaght area, including a brief mention of Kiltalown House:

Not far from Knockmore and Mount Hastings was the small demesne known as Kiltalown. It was here that Mr. J. Robinson built a large house on the site of one built years before by a Mr. Carpenter. Mr. Carpenter when building Kiltalown destroyed the ruins of an ancient church which has been there for hundreds of years. He was a partner in Bolton, Humphries and Co. and was quite wealthy. Ben Bradley who had been put in Jail for fraud had a son named Tom who lived at Kiltalown. Tom Bradley made a fortune from money lending and he had many houses in Dublin. Kiltalown House is still standing today beside what is known as Kiltalown Housing Estate.

=== Public ownership ===
Around May 1987, Kiltalown House began to be used in a healthcare, or community capacity, as it was noted in the May 1997 edition of The Knocklyon News (a local parish newsletter), that the house had recently "celebrated its tenth birthday" on 8 May 1997 with "an Open Day attended by President Mary Robinson and a host of local public representatives" and "open(ed) its doors" to welcome anyone who wanted to avail of its counselling services.

The Tallaght Echo note that the building was acquired by Dublin County Council in 1987, and "it was around this time that people in Jobstown suffered a series of distressing tragedies, which prompted some local people to come together and form what amounted to a spiritual support group." The house was unoccupied at the time, and a group of women from Kilclare Estate came together and made some enquiries, from which "an exciting new chapter in the house's eventful history" was to begin, and the house was subsequently handed over to the community on a "caretakers lease."

In October 1987, the Irish Press wrote that politician Mervyn Taylor had said that Dublin County Council had "given the outbuildings of Kiltalown House to the Kiltalown development project" where it was intended to house 22 projects, employing 140 people.

Army fire-fighters last night fought a major blaze in Tallaght which caused extensive damage to Kiltalown House, Jobstown. Soldiers had to cross fields to get water to fight the blaze which broke out at about 9 p.m. The house had been unoccupied for some time and nobody was injured in the fire.

— "House Blaze in Tallaght". The Irish Press. 30 January 1988

On the night of 29 January 1988, a major fire caused extensive damage to the building, leaving it in a "derelict condition". Major renovation works were then carried out by FÁS through the C.Y.P.T. Scheme (Community Youth Training Programme).

As of April 1988, the Irish Press reported that the residents of Tallaght were seeking funds to purchase and convert the house for the community, as well as the construction of a leisure complex for the wider area: "The Plan involves the purchase of Kiltalown House in West Tallaght, its conversion into an enterprise centre, a major "funderland" project, a major leisure complex for Jobstown, Fettercairn, Killinarden, Brookfield and Rossfield. The local community council says that with £2m raised for Maynooth College and several millions raised for the Third World, they see no reason why Tallaght would not qualify for such funding given Tallaght's high level of unemployment and poor facilities." Fundraising for projects at Kiltalown House took place throughout summer 1989, and a contemporary publication Tallaght Trails, Tales and Walking Boots described it thus:

Just a little above the Jobstown Inn on the right hand side is Kiltalown House. This was another very pleasant residence, but again with a comparatively small farm, so all its owners were either of independent means or business or professional people. There had been a very ancient church near where the house stands. It is stated that this was knocked down by a Mr. Carpenter, who built the present house, which is now a community centre. In 1988 it was damaged by fire and a FÁS team are restoring it at present. It should be very interesting to visit when it is finished.

In August of 1989, a "summer school" of creative and spiritual activities including drama, art, yoga, clay crafts and meditation was held in the house over the course of five days. A 1993 news piece on the house wrote that: "Over the years, Kiltalown House has been allowed to fall into disrepair. But the local women, who saw great potential in the house, presented Dublin City Council with detailed plans on how (it) could be renovated and become an important facility in their area. Today, Kiltalown House is restored to its former beauty." According to Ó Suilleabháin, who summarised 2013 works in the building:

...many of the existing internal finishes in the house date from the refurbishment works of the late 1980s. None of the original first-floor level timbers, decorative ceiling plasterwork or wall finishes in the late Georgian block survived the fire [..] and the refurbishment works which followed.

Ó Suilleabháin also noted how "for some unknown reason the seven windows at first floor level" in the late Georgian block to the front of the house had had "their shutters and lining boards removed" and surmised that they might have been removed during these renovation works. Some of the windows in this block were older and much bigger than others onsite, and as of 2013 were noted to "rattle during windy weather."

== Development of Tallaght and employment issues ==
In 1821, the population of the civil parish of Tallaght was 4,348 people. By 1961, more than a century later, the population had remained practically static at 4,565.

The development of high-density housing in Tallaght began about 1969, and by 1996 had become Dublin's largest suburb with a population of 85,000, with many residents having been prompted to move to Tallaght from substandard or overcrowded conditions in inner-city areas of Dublin, and others moving to Dublin from rural Ireland in search of better opportunities. In a Dáil Éireann debate in May 1996, it was noted that "Tallaght (was comparable with) the size of Limerick — 97,000 people live there". (See: List of urban areas in the Republic of Ireland)

In January 1985, a Community Training and Employment Consortium (COMTEC) was established in Tallaght by the Youth Employment Agency, with its objective being to "to bring together and coordinate the work of manpower and education agencies in the area, and to promote community involvement in local provision of manpower services."

The lack of amenities or job prospects in Tallaght afforded to the sudden influx of newcomers was still being felt into the early 1990s, with people complaining of isolation, in an area that felt like it was composed solely of 'the houses and the mountains' according to one resident. John Reid, a staff member at Tallaght Community Workshops, spoke in 1992 of the failures of planners as he saw it:

I believe the Government is certainly responsible for some of the things that have happened, particularly in west Tallaght. They've created ghettos, in that all the unemployed people are in the one area, because about five years ago the Government offered a £5,000 grant for people to give up their County Council or Corporation houses (in Tallaght), and move to a private housing estate, with the result that all the people that couldn't afford to do that, such as the unemployed people, are all stuck together in the one area. And everything is doom and gloom then, because there's no jobs to look forward to, there's no neighbours to look at to say 'Well they have a job, now if they have a job, I can go out and get meself a job'.

Peggy Towers of Killinarden Community Centre, speaking in 1992, noted that the community "definitely needed more employment" as around "50 to 60% of men in Killinarden" were unemployed and "an awful lot of children that are over the age of 18 are unemployed as well". Secondary school students interviewed at the same time noted that some employers were discriminating against potential candidates from Tallaght as the area had a negative reputation, which further limited their possibilities.

Brian Hayes, a Fine Gael politician, noted in Dáil Éireann in 1996 that the "Kiltalown site in west Tallaght takes up 20 acres. Most of the area has unemployment rates of 80 per cent, there are connected large-scale problems and the social amenities are minimal."

== Kiltalown Development Project ==
In a Dáil Éireann debate dated 21 Oct 1987, the funding of a planned initiative at Kiltalown House (called the Kiltalown Development Project) was raised by Irish Labour Party politician Mervyn Taylor (1931–2021), whose constituency was Tallaght, with the following introduction:

I want to outline briefly to the House what is the situation obtaining in that part of west Tallaght. This is an area developed almost in its entirety by local authorities. Dublin Corporation and Dublin County Council went in there, constructed houses over the last ten years and have provided little or nothing else. The unemployment situation obtaining in west Tallaght bears no relationship even to other hard-hit areas. The appalling truth of the situation is that there is an approximation of some 70 per cent of the people of this area without employment. There is a feeling of hopelessness, of depression that has to be seen to be believed and that can be felt tangibly when one visits the area. That is a sad prospect to have to contemplate but a remarkable thing occurred there.

Taylor noted that despite this, "a group of local people from these local authority estates" had come together to form a committee named the 'Kiltalown Development Project' for the purposes of "helping themselves, of organising employment to utilise the skills of the unemployed who live in that area, from their own resources and knowledge" and had "secured a premises from Dublin County Council", namely the ancillary buildings surrounding Kiltalown House. Taylor acknowledged the support that Dublin County Council had already exhibited to the project, and that they had given:

...voluntarily, without charge, to this project committee the outhouse buildings and stable buildings of the former mansion in the area called Kiltalown House together with a degree of surrounding area so that these could be repaired and sectioned off to provide units where skilled but unemployed people from the area could come in and set up useful productive work for the purposes of coming off the dole. That was donated to this committee by Dublin County Council.

Taylor recommended that the 'Kiltalown development project' be granted the £70,000 support they requested in order to "develop the project, to roof these buildings, wall them off, to provide doors and so on." The group had provided a whole "manifesto", and booklet outlining what they intended to do, covering the areas in which they would work, and had costed their enterprise very carefully to arrive at a figure of £70,000. Taylor noted that he, alongside other Deputies representing the constituency, had met with many of the people who were desirous of setting up business in the proposed units, and was confident that those people "could come off the dole and set up as viable manufactures there. More than that, many of them have said that they would bring in apprentices, young school leavers, from the area and train them in their skills."

A selection of the commercial initiatives intended to have been undertaken in the units were those of graphics, framing and designs and posters, steelworks, the manufacture of non-ferrous products, the manufacture of ornamental gates and railings, the manufacture of ornamental lamps and lamp standards, bicycle repairs, electrical works, "light engineering and components therefore", the production of a historic newspaper, the provision of security services and arts and crafts and picture framing. Jim Lovett of Youth Employment Agency was noted as having done "tremendous work" to develop the project, as had AnCo (An Chomhairle Oiliúna), the predecessor to FÁS (An Foras Áiseanna Saothair), an unemployment assistance scheme in Ireland.

In early 1988, 'Kiltalown House Centre' was approved for funding under scheme of grants to voluntary organisations. Minister for Social Welfare Michael Woods approved a grant of £20,000 from National Lottery funds to be put "towards the setting up of workshops and the purchase of equipment" at the centre.

=== 1990 to 2005 ===
By 1991, it was noted that "therapy courses and creativity programmes" were being operated out of Kiltalown House. Amy Dunne, in her 2022 memoir "I Am Amy Dunne: A Very Private Tragedy, A Very Public Case" remembered her time growing up in the Jobstown area, where her mother was involved in projects at Kiltalown House:

My mam was artistic and creative in her own way. She moved from Rathfarnham to Jobstown when I was born, and when I was young she worked as a community arts coordinator. The woman I remember from my childhood was a wild, waistcoat-wearing hippie with a paintbrush. She became involved in the arts through art therapy classes in a centre near our home that specialised in counselling and holistic treatments for local people. Her experience in this centre, Kiltalown House, led to her becoming one of the founder members of a group called Tallaght New Opportunities for Women, or Tallaght NOW.

A September 1991 piece in the Echo noted that the house was by then a thriving "Creativity Centre", and its autumn programme included an array of courses including aromatherapy, ki-massage, bio-enegetics, reflexology and osteopathy. The newspaper noted that the house itself was also undergoing an important transformation, and that many parts of the building had already been renovated and redecorated. The piece concluded by noting that "All of the workshops, services and classes on the [..] programme are very reasonably priced, and the centre has a very simple philosophy on monetary matters. Their motto is: "Don't let money stop you – come and talk to us."

Gerry Judge, supervisor at Kiltalown told the Echo newspaper in 1993 that the house was "an invaluable asset to this area" and that:

"It has become a focal point, whereby people who are stressed from living in this material age and who want to embark on self-development, can do so in an affordable and peaceful setting. We are convinced that Kiltalown House will become the healing Centre of Ireland."

In 1995, as part of the 'Ethics in Public Office Act 1995', members of Dáil Éireann were required to declare conflicts of interest pursuant to the act. Chris Flood, a Fianna Fáil politician, noted his involvement as a non-executive director in a company named Alternative Entertainments, "c/o Kiltalown House, Jobstown, Tallaght, Dublin 24: Community Arts Group."

In 1996, the Combat Poverty Agency gave a grant of £1,275 to a group named "Kiltalown House, Ltd., Dublin" as part of its Community Development Education and Training Grants.

In the May 1997 edition of The Knocklyon News (a local parish newsletter), it was noted that Kiltalown House had recently "celebrated its tenth birthday on May 8th with an Open Day attended by President Mary Robinson and a host of local public representatives" and had opened its doors and welcomed anyone who wanted to avail of its counselling services. Kiltalown House was noted as being "a centre offering help and assistance to those unfortunate enough to have an alcohol or drug problems."

In the 2002 book The New Neighbourhood of Dublin, architect Michael Fewer retraced routes taken together by historians J. M. Hone and Maurice Craig across County Dublin in 1949, documenting the changes that had transformed the areas they visited over the intervening half-century. Fewer described the area around Kiltalown House in 2002 thus:

Jobstown is now at the centre of a large area of housing estates, and although the 'green spaces' are often grazed by piebald ponies belonging to Traveller families, the days of point-to-point racing are long gone. Just past the Jobstown Inn on the right is Kiltalown House, a simple granite-fronted building of about 1800, added to an earlier house which still survives at the back. It is one of the few smaller country houses around Tallaght to survive the sweeping developments of the 1970s and 1980s, and serves today as a community activity centre. It is not until the Blessington road turns south under Verschoyle's Hill that the suburban spread of Tallaght housing peters out, and, except for the frequent bungalows, the road passes through countryside relatively unchanged since 1949.

In March 2003, three proposals from South Dublin County Council relating to Traveller-specific accommodation in the South Dublin area were before the Minister for the Environment and Local Government at the time, with the provision of five new group houses at Kiltalown Lane being under review.

In 2004, seventeen locations were at that point due to receive new Garda 'town centre CCTV systems', subject to the availability of funds. It was asked in Dáil Éireann if Kiltalown would be included in the closed circuit television scheme "as required by the community".

== Tallaght Rehabilitation Project ==
Pat Daly, manager of Tallaght Rehabilitation Project, noted in an official TRP YouTube video that the project began in 1997, initiated by the Tallaght Drugs Taskforce. The organisation were initially based in the Church of St. Thomas the Apostle nearby before moving into Kiltalown House on 18 July 2005, where the organisation have remained since. Kiltalown House was officially opened in this new capacity in October 2006.

According to the official website of the Tallaght Rehabilitation Project (TRP) in July 2025, the project is:

A Community based rehabilitation day-programme for people in recovery from drug and alcohol addiction and who reside in the Tallaght Wide area. The programme was developed as a 'continuum of care' to assist those who have become drug or alcohol free or who are stable in treatment on prescribed methadone. Working from a therapeutic and holistic ethos the programme aims to provide opportunities to enable participants to actively address behavioural issues which may underpin addiction problems and to develop and enhance life skills and facilitate personal growth and recovery.

The TRP also hosts a "day programme for people who are in recovery from alcohol/drug addiction and provides a dedicated aftercare service".

In October 2006, Fianna Fáil politician Charlie O'Connor acknowledged the "tireless efforts" of the many organisations in all of Ireland which were "doing so much" to combat the drugs problem. O'Connor noted his constituency of Tallaght in particular, where:

Tallaght Rehabilitation Project, for example, hit the headlines last week following its recent move to Kiltalown House, an historic building in west Tallaght. I know I am not supposed to mention the President, but I would like to inform the House that President McAleese joined the Minister of State, Deputy Conor Lenihan, Deputy Crowe and me at the official opening last week.

In 2008, the former stables and outhouses at the east end of the house were converted to use as a kitchenette, living room and auditorium. The walls of these buildings was described as "uncoursed random rubble walls with no internal plaster" and comparatively thin at 400mm. The only supplementary works done during 2008 was to lime wash the inner surface of the walls and to apply a render to their outer surface. As a result, it was noted that there was "considerable heat loss through these walls, although the rooms contained within are only occasionally used."

As of 2009, the project was being mainly funded by FÁS, SDCC, the HSE, Pobal, and the Department of Community, Rural and Gaeltacht Affairs, and was overseen internally by a Board of Management.

=== Room rental ===
In the organisation's Yearly Review for 2009, it was noted that "the number of groups availing of the Room Rental service at (the house) ha(d) increased greatly (..) through presentations to local agencies and business(es)." Dedicated meeting, therapy, training and counselling rooms within the house had been made available to rent, which groups such as martial arts classes, spiritual healers, counselors, the VEC, Local Drug Task Forces (LDTF), the Irish Wheelchair Association, SDCC and church groups had made use of.

=== Energy upgrade, 2013 ===
During October and November 2013, energy upgrading works were carried out to Kiltalown House, as part of an SEAI Better Energy Warmer Homes 2013 Scheme for low income homes, which was 36% funded by SDCC.

The Community Services department of South Dublin County Council initiated the works on the house in order to "reduce the cost of energy for space and water heating and to ensure the continued economic use of the building", as the budget of Tallaght Rehabilitation Project had "in recent years" come under increasing pressure for maintenance and energy use.

The new central heating system and energy upgrading works carried out in the house were noted in the South Dublin County Council - Annual Report 2013 to have "improved the comfort levels for all user groups and staff (at Tallaght Rehabilitation Project), and (to have) reduced the energy costs." Previous to the works, most of the house was heated with electric storage heaters which were "hard to control and expensive to operate." A new boiler was installed to supplement one already existing in the east part of the house.

In early 2013 before the works, the Building Energy Rating of Kiltalown House had been D2.

Earlier in 2013, Minister of State at the Department of Health Alex White met with members of the board of Tallaght Rehabilitation Project at Kiltalown House, who provided a "very comprehensive briefing on the day to day challenges the board face(d) in tackling the on-going destructive consequences of drugs in their communities." The meeting had happened on foot of an invitation from the board of the Tallaght Local Drugs Force.

=== Building usage, 2013 ===
In his 2013 report, which considered energy usage patterns in the building, Ó Suilleabháin noted the day-to-day operations onsite throughout the different parts of the house:

The pattern of use is such that the building is in use 7 days a week from 8.00 AM until 5.00 or 6.00 PM in the evening. It is staffed by approximately 7 people and visited by large number of people who stay for an hour or more. The rooms are used as staff areas, consultancy or training rooms and ancillary service areas. Nobody resides in the house. Some rooms are used more than others, the entrance lobby, reception area, the staff offices and kitchen (at the south-western end of the rere part of the house) are used regularly. The meeting or training rooms at first floor level of the late Georgian block and at the north-eastern end of the rere part of the house are used occasionally. The kitchenette, auditorium and toilets at the north-eastern end of the house are used less often.

=== Charities registered at the building, 2016 ===
In May 2016, both 'Tallaght Rehabilitation Project' (charity number: 13829) and 'Church of Ireland Tallaght' (charity number: 4226) were both listed as charities then-using 'Kiltalown House, Tallaght, Co Dublin' as their address.

=== 2020s ===
In May 2022, Tallaght Rehabilitation Project launched a new 20-week Horticulture and Garden project at Kiltalown House. The initiative, which was a collaboration with TASP (Tallaght Addiction Support Project), aimed to get participants active in gardening and learn how to grow their own vegetables.

In December 2022, it was reported in the Tallaght Echo that the centre had recently had to "suspend two of its aftercare meetings" from five times a week to three, owing to staff shortages and a lack of funding. At the time, the aftercare meetings had up to 37 attendees, and functioned in supporting them on their recovery from drug and alcohol addiction. Pat Daly, manager of the Tallaght Rehabilitation Project, explained that "Most of the staff here are part-time project workers because we have a funding issue" and that "TRP's work is part of the overall jigsaw of support services for people who are pursuing recovery from addiction in the Tallaght area, and for many it marks a significant point in their recovery."

Also in December 2022, Pat Daly, manager of TRP, included a note to the community in the Christmas edition of The Tallaght Echo, explaining how the organisation had "successfully navigated (their) way through the COVID-19 pandemic" over the preceding two years, and had been "delighted to return to full services in 2022." Daly noted the success of TRP's annual residential trip that year, where clients of the programmes went to visit Ovoca Manor in Avoca, County Wicklow, and also the success of their sold-out show at the Civic Theatre, Tallaght in September which "celebrate(d) recovery and challenge(d) the stigma that surrounds people who are struggling with addiction problems."

In May 2025, a partnership cycle took place between Ballymun Recovery Road Cycle Club and the Tallaght Rehabilitation Project Recovery Road Cycle Club, with participants cycling from Ballymun to Kiltalown House.

As of late 2022, the day programme at the Tallaght Rehabilitation Project day programme had 21 clients, and a waiting list of five, while the aftercare meetings had up to 37 attendees.

The website of the Irish Association for Counselling and Psychotherapy had two accredited psychotherapists listed as operating out of Kiltalown House as of July 2025.

== Location ==
Some housing estates within the townland of Kiltalown incorporate the name of the townland into their titles, such as Kiltalown Green, View, Hill, Heights, Road, Grove, etc. A row of six notable local authority cottages dating from the early 1900s, and named Kiltalown Cottages, exist across the N81 road from Kiltalown House.

== Kiltalown Park ==
Kiltalown Park
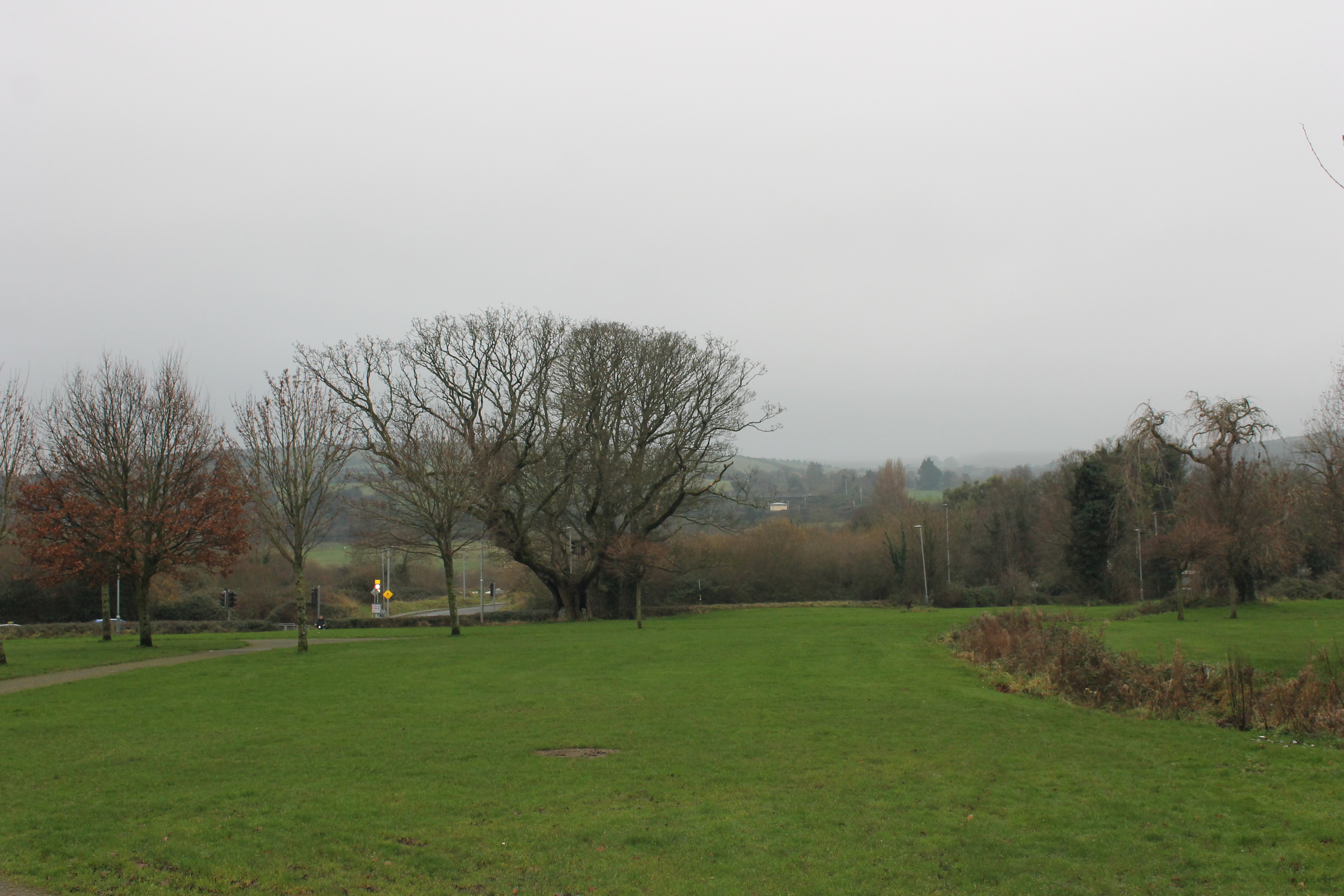
- The park in winter
- Interactive map of Kiltalown Park
- Type: Urban park
- Location: Kiltalown; Blessington Road; Dublin 24
- Coordinates: 53°16′30″N 6°24′10″W
- Area: 11.9 acres (4.82 ha)
- Open: All year

Kiltalown Park is an 11.9 acre public park to the south of the house. It is enclosed by the N81 road (Blessington Road), which forms its boundary to the south and east.

In March 2023, local resident and People Before Profit candidate for Tallaght South, Kay Keane, organised a public meeting in the park to address the issue of neglect which it, as well as Jobstown playground, had been suffering in recent years.

In June 2024, Keane, as well as Paul Murphy (TD), spoke from the park prior to the 2024 Irish local elections, with Murphy highlighting the work Keane had achieved thus far in securing investment for park upkeep and renovation.

As of January 2025, South Dublin County Council were noted as having implemented a "long-flowering meadow management" in the upper sections of Kiltalown Park "in recent years". This treatment involved altering grass mowing patterns, as well as adherence to a grassland management regime of only cutting the grass once per year. The result means that some areas of the park are cut at the end of the flowering season in late summer / early autumn "mimicking traditional hay meadow management", whilst others are left to overwinter and are "cut in spring providing vital nesting and overwintering habitats for insects". SDCC noted that this was an objective of the All-Ireland Pollinator Plan, and:

...an environmentally enhancing way of managing public open space. The cutting and collecting programme allows wildflowers to set seed and reduces competition from grass species, depleting nitrogen levels in the soil. These meadow initiatives are key actions in the Council's Climate Change Action Plan.

As of 2024, South Dublin County Council noted that they managed 195 hectares of meadows across the entirety of their jurisdiction (South Dublin), including 175 hectares of long-flowering meadows and 20 hectares of short-flowering meadows.

== See also ==
- An Cosán, another organisation in the Kiltalown area, that offers adult education and other services to women from disadvantaged areas
- Illicit drug use in Ireland
- Jobstown House, a nearby 19th century house (since demolished)
- Kiltalown FC, a local football club
- Kiltalown Lane, a nearby lane that was the scene of an accidental killing of a trespasser in 2022 that resulted in a lengthy and highly publicised court case
- Killinardan House, a nearby 19th century house (since demolished)
- List of historic houses in the Republic of Ireland
- New Hope, a residential centre in Kiltalown, for men recovering from addiction

== Sources ==
- Ball, Francis Elrington (1 December 1904). A History of the County of Dublin: The People, Parishes and Antiquities from the Earliest Times to the Close of the Eighteenth Century. Part Third (PDF). Dublin: Alex. Thom & Co. (Limited), Abbey-St.
- Clarke, Geraldine; Drew, Niamh; Coady, Irene; O'Toole, Jackie; O'Connor, Siobhan; Raftery, Lily (1989). Tallaght Trails, Tales and Walking Boots (Illustrated guided walks of historical Tallaght). Tallaght: Tallaght Heritage Teamwork Scheme.
- Colgan, Nathaniel (1 August 1895). "The Orchids of County Dublin". The Irish Naturalist. I.V.. Dublin: Alex. Thom & Co. (Limited), 87, 88, & 89, Abbey-Street: 193–198.
- Cooper, Thompson, ed. (30 August 1869). The Register, and Magazine of Biography, A Record of Births, Marriages, Deaths, and other Genealogical and Personal Occurrences. Volume the First. Westminster: Nichols and Sons, 25, Parliament Street.
- Creggan, Michael; Minogue and Associates; Aegis Archaeology; Geoscience Ltd (1 May 2021). "South Dublin County Development Plan 2022-2028. Appendix 9 - Draft Landscape Character Assessment (LCA) of South Dublin County" (PDF).
- Domville Handcock, William (1877). The History and Antiquities of Tallaght in the County of Dublin (PDF). Dublin: Hodges, Figgis, & Co., Ltd., 104 Grafton Street.
- Dix, Ernest Reginald McClintock (31 December 1925). "Some Antiquities on Tallaght Hill". The Journal of the Royal Society of Antiquaries of Ireland. 15 (2). Royal Society of Antiquaries of Ireland: 126–129. JSTOR 25513370.
- Dunne, Amy (2022). I Am Amy Dunne: A Very Private Tragedy, A Very Public Case. Dublin: Gill Books. ISBN 978-0717190980.
- Healy, Pat (1 June 2004) [Original text written circa 1985]. All Roads Lead to Tallaght. Tallaght: South Dublin Libraries. ISBN 0954766008.
- Hollingsworth, Henry Albert 'Harry' (1 December 1974). "Hollingsworth Register. Volume Ten. Number Four. December 1974. Whole No. 40" (PDF). The Hollingsworth Register (To Publish Abstracts or Verbatim Copies of an Many Records of the Hollingsworth Family, World-wide, from the Earliest Times Until the Present Day, as is Humanly and Financially Possible). 10 (4). Harry Hollingsworth: 99–126. ISSN 0018-3636.
- Hone, Joseph Maunsell; Craig, Maurice; Fewer, Michael (2002). The New Neighbourhood of Dublin. Dublin: A. & A. Farmar, Beech House, Ranelagh Village. ISBN 1-899047-78-6.
- Leet, Ambrose (1814). A Directory To The Market Towns, Villages, Gentlemen's Seats And Other Noted Places in Ireland (2nd ed.). Dublin: Brett Smith, 46, Mary-Street.
- Lentaigne, J. (12 June 1848). "On Some Portions of a Skeleton, an Urn, and Fragment of Another, Found in the Townland of Kiltalown". Proceedings of the Royal Irish Academy: Archaeology, Culture, History, Literature. 4 (1847 - 1850). Dublin: Royal Irish Academy: 187–188. JSTOR 20520266.
- Lewis, Samuel (1837). A Topographical Dictionary of Ireland. Vol. II. London: S. Lewis and Company.
- McNally, Mary (1 January 1999). South County Scrapbook - History of South Dublin County. Tallaght: Tallaght Historical Society.
- Ní Mharcaigh, Máirín (1997). "The Medieval Parish Churches of South-West County Dublin". Proceedings of the Royal Irish Academy: Archaeology, Culture, History, Literature. 97C (5). Royal Irish Academy: 245–296. JSTOR 25516202.
- Ó Suilleabháin, Feargal (1 February 2015). "Thermal upgrading and energy-use improvement works to Kiltalown house, Kiltalown, Tallaght, Dublin 24. Building Dossier for works done during October and November 2013" (PDF). source.southdublinlibraries.ie. South Dublin County Council.
- Price, Liam (30 September 1944). "The Manor of Bothercolyn". The Journal of the Royal Society of Antiquaries of Ireland. 14 (3). Royal Society of Antiquaries of Ireland: 107–108. JSTOR 25510446.
- Simpson, Anne (1991). Blooming Dublin: Choice, Change and Contradictions. Edinburgh: Mainstream Publishing. ISBN 978-1851583249.
- Smith, Martin; Gough, Judy; Sheridan, Domhnall; Dunne, Olive; Sullivan, Helena; Naughton, Yvette; Flanagan, Paula; Duffy, Kelvin; Pujolas, Paul (1986). Allen, Regina (ed.). St. Maelruans and Tallaght. Tallaght: Tallaght Chamber of Commerce / Department of Labour Teamwork Project.
- Smith, Martin; Gough, Judy; Sheridan, Domhnall; Dunne, Olive; Sullivan, Helena; Naughton, Yvette; Flanagan, Paula; Duffy, Kelvin; Pujolas, Paul (2021). Allen, Regina (ed.). Transcription of burials in St. Maelruain's Churchyard digitised from printed St. Maelruain's Teamwork Project. Tallaght: Tallaght Chamber of Commerce / Department of Labour Teamwork Project.
- Swords, Kieran (1996). "Ballyroan Townland: Delineation and Decline: Part 1". Dublin Historical Record. 42 (2). Old Dublin Society: 118–129. JSTOR 30101146.
- Thom, Alexander, ed. (1852). Thom's Irish Almanac and Official Directory, with the Post-Office Dublin City and County Directory, for the year 1852. Dublin: Alexander Thom, Printer and Publisher, 87 and 88, Abbey-Street.
- Thom, Alexander, ed. (1857). Thom's Irish Almanac and Official Directory of the United Kingdom for the year 1857. Dublin: Alexander Thom and Sons, Printers and Publishers, 87, Abbey-Street.
- Thom, Alexander, ed. (1859). Thom's Almanac and Official Directory of the United Kingdom of Great Britain and Ireland: for the year 1859. Dublin: Alexander Thom and Sons, Printers and Publishers, 87 & 88, Abbey-Street.
- Waddell, John (1990). The Bronze Age Burials of Ireland. Galway: Galway University Press. ISBN 0907775365.
- Wade, Auctore Gualtero (1794). Catalogus Systematicus Plantarum Indigenarum in Comitatu Dublinensi Inventarum. Dublini: Gul. Sleater, Typographum Societatis Dublinensis, in Vico Dicto Dame-Street.
- Combat Poverty Agency - Annual Report 1996 / An Gníomhaireacht do Chomhrac na Bochtaine Tuairisc Bhliantúil - 1996. Dublin: Combat Poverty Agency. 1 July 1997.
- Published by the Irish Homœopathic Society. A Concise View of the System of Homœopathy, And Refutation of the Objections Commonly Brought Forward Against It. Dublin: Irish Homœopathic Society. James McClashan, 21, D'Olier-Street. 1848.
- The Proceedings of the Royal Dublin Society, from November 4, 1852, to September 8, 1853. Vol. LXXXIX. Dublin: The Royal Dublin Society. Printed at the University Press, by M. H. Gill, Printer to the Royal Dublin Society. 8 September 1853.
- Writer, Staff (1934). "Tenders invited". The Irish Builder and Engineer. 76. Dublin: Mecredy, Percy & Company: 118, 480.
