= Hogarty =

Hogarty is a surname. Notable people with the surname include:

- Alexander Hogarty, American football player and coach
- Philip Hogarty (1988–2008), Irish chess player
- William P. Hogarty (1840–1914), American Civil War veteran

== See also ==
- Hogarty, Wisconsin
