= Katherine Zappone controversy =

Political scandal in Ireland

Coordinates: 53.3386°N 6.2529°W

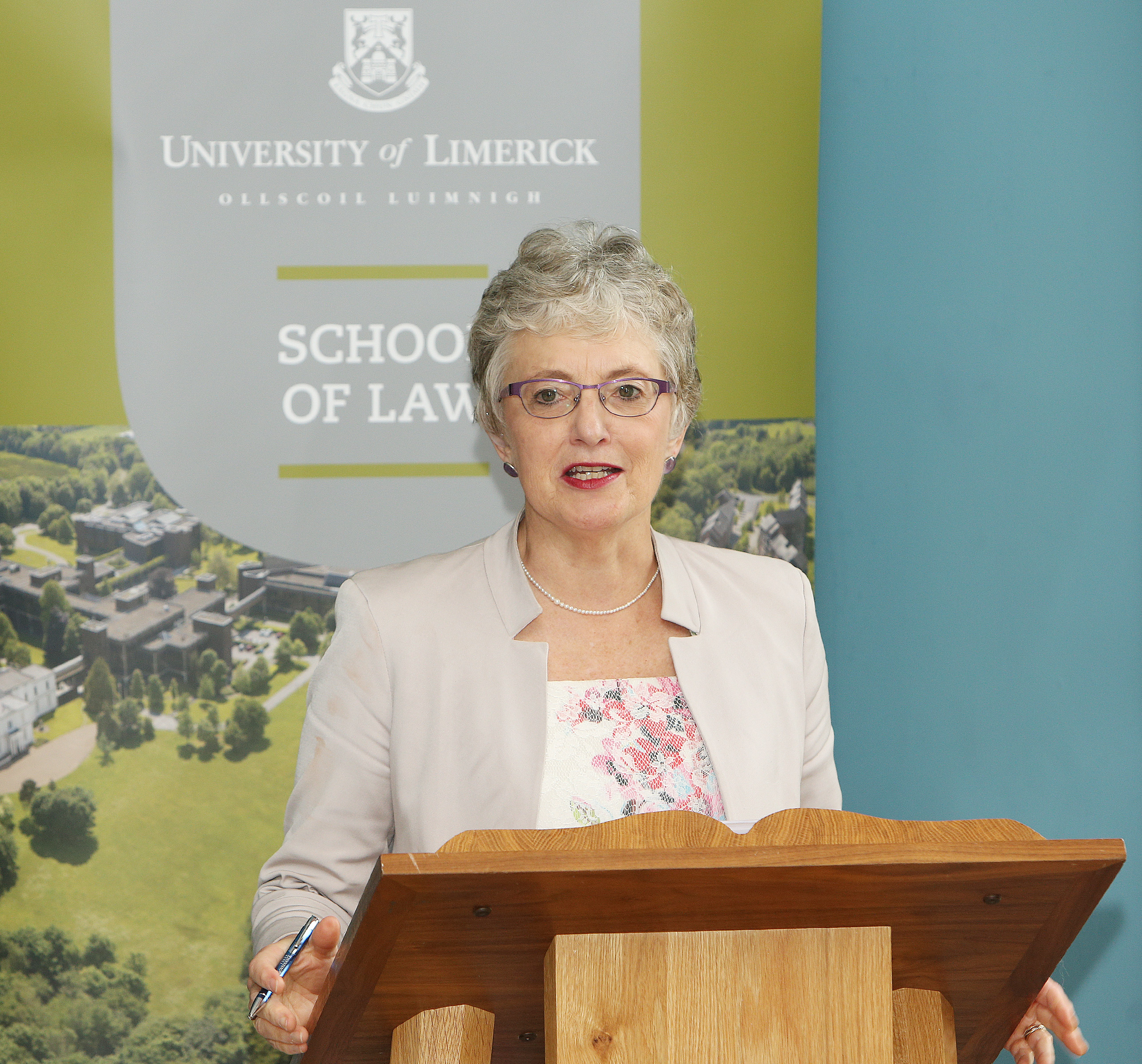
The controversy has largely centred around Katherine Zappone

The Katherine Zappone controversy, also known as the Merrion Hotel controversy or Merrion Gate, was a political scandal in Ireland involving associates and former colleagues of former Minister for Children Katherine Zappone who attended an outdoor gathering at the Merrion Hotel in Dublin, on 21 July 2021, six days prior to her controversial appointment as UN special envoy.

The gathering took place during the COVID-19 pandemic in the Republic of Ireland. A total of about 50 guests attended the gathering organised by Zappone, including the Tánaiste, Leo Varadkar.

Following the publication of the story on 4 August by the Irish Independent, there was widespread anger among opposition TDs. Ultimately Zappone would decline to take up the position as UN envoy following criticism of the appointment procedure.

== Background ==
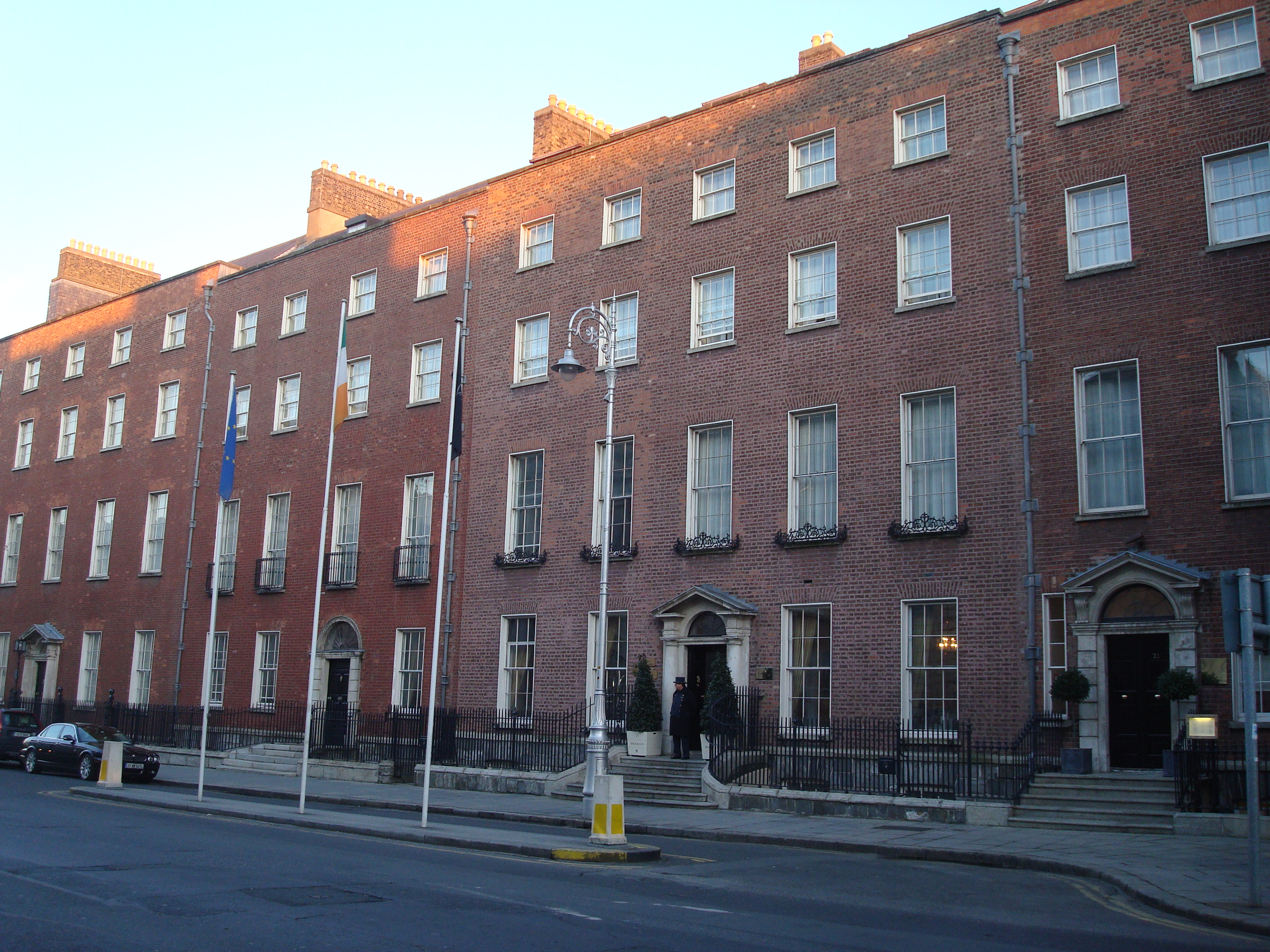
The Merrion Hotel, seen pictured here, played host to the event organised by Zappone.

On 27 July 2021, during a Cabinet meeting, it was revealed by the Irish Examiner's Daniel McConnell that Zappone was to be appointed to the newly created position of "Special Envoy to the UN for Freedom of Opinion and Expression".

It subsequently emerged that the proposed appointment had not been flagged in advance of the meeting where it was proposed by Minister for Foreign Affairs Simon Coveney, raising the concerns of the Taoiseach, Micheál Martin. However, he did not block the appointment, attracting criticism from within government, the opposition and the public, with Sinn Féin describing the appointment as "cronyism".

In the following days, it was reported that Zappone had lobbied for the creation of and appointment to the part-time position, which was not openly advertised or subject to a competition.

Calls for Zappone to decline the job gained momentum on 4 August after the Merrion Hotel controversy arose when the Irish Independent reported that six days prior to the announcement of her appointment (on 21 July), Zappone had hosted a gathering for 50 guests, including politicians such as the Tánaiste, Leo Varadkar, at the Merrion Hotel, while the COVID-19 pandemic in the Republic of Ireland was ongoing. Comparisons were made between the gathering and the Golfgate scandal from earlier in the pandemic. Zappone, the Merrion Hotel, the Attorney General and the Tánaiste all insisted that the event was compliant with COVID-19 rules at the time.

Later that same day, Zappone announced that she would not take up the envoy role, stating "While I am honoured to have been appointed by the Government to be the Special Envoy on Freedom of Opinion and Expression, it is clear that criticism of the appointment process has impacted the legitimacy of the role itself. It is my conviction that a Special Envoy role can only be of real value to Ireland and to the global community if the appointment is acceptable to all parties."

The controversy took another twist as the Government Press Office released a statement saying that advice from the Attorney General Paul Gallagher was that organised events and gatherings could take place for up to 200 people "including social, recreational, exercise, cultural, entertainment or community events".

== Notable attendees ==
- Leo Varadkar, Tánaiste, Minister for Enterprise, Trade and Employment, leader of Fine Gael and TD for Dublin West. Katherine Zappone had previously been a minister in Varadkar's government.
- Ivana Bacik, Labour Party TD for Dublin Bay South who had been part of Zappone's legal team when she sought recognition of her marriage to Ann Louise Gilligan.
- Donal Geoghegan, Green Party leader Eamon Ryan's chief of staff and previously Political Coordinator for Zappone and Seán Canney while government ministers.
- Fergal Lynch, Secretary General of the Department of Children, Equality, Disability, Integration and Youth while Zappone was Minister for Children and Youth Affairs.

== Reaction and consequences ==
Following the breaking of the story, the gathering was criticised heavily across Irish society.

The Government was accused by Sinn Féin's Matt Carthy of throwing public health guidelines "out the window" and changing COVID-19 guidelines to "retrospectively approve the attendance of Tánaiste at an event". The claim by Carthy was made after the Attorney General issued a statement saying that the COVID-19 regulations "provide for organised outdoor events and gatherings of up to 200 people".

Sinn Féin leader Mary Lou McDonald called for the guest list for the Merrion Hotel function to be made public, while her party colleague, David Cullinane, accused the Government of "making it up as they go along" following the statement outlining the Attorney General's advice and that the Fáilte Ireland guidelines state that "organised events are currently not permitted" with certain exceptions.

Aontú leader Peadar Tóibín said the gathering was a "jaw-dropping mix of hypocrisy and cronyism".

As the story developed, Tánaiste Leo Varadkar and Minister for Foreign Affairs Simon Coveney acknowledged they made mistakes in seeking to give a newly created taxpayer-funded job to Zappone, their former Government colleague. Varadkar issued a statement confirming he attended the gathering and said he was "confident" that COVID-19 regulations were not breached.

The appointment of Zappone to the job blindsided the Taoiseach Micheál Martin, who said he had no prior knowledge of the proposal going to Cabinet.

The next day, on 5 August, the political controversy continued with Minister of State and Fianna Fáil TD for Waterford Mary Butler describing as a "complete shambles" the handling of the appointment of Zappone to the special envoy role, while there were calls for Varadkar to make a further statement on the controversy and the advice from Government that outdoor social events of up to 200 people were permitted under COVID-19 regulations. The chief executive of the Restaurants Association of Ireland Adrian Cummins said that the hospitality sector did not know until the Attorney General confirmed that up to 200 people were allowed for outdoor gatherings within social settings.

In the wake of the controversy, Fáilte Ireland updated its hospitality guidelines on 6 August to allow customers book multiple tables and host outdoor gatherings with live music for up to 200 people.

Sinn Féin health spokesperson David Cullinane said that it is incredible that Varadkar, who was negotiating the regulations for the hospitality sector, had to ring the hotel and ask if the event he was attending was in compliance with the health guidelines.

Speaking on RTÉ News: Six One, Varadkar expressed his regret for attending the event, but said it was not in breach of Government regulations, and "probably" not in breach of Fáilte Ireland guidelines.

On 8 August, the Taoiseach made his first comments about Varadkar's attendance at the event saying there were shortcomings of "clarity and consistency" in guidelines and that regulations were not breached, but that guidelines were not clear about the status of such events.

On 10 August, Fianna Fáil's youth wing Ógra Fianna Fáil called on Varadkar to resign following his attendance at the event. In a statement it said that it was "deeply concerned" by the Varadkar's conduct and that it would be a "mistake" for him to become Taoiseach in December 2022.

On 1 September, Simon Coveney admitted that he had deleted texts from his phone in relation to the Zappone affair. Coveney gave a number of reasons for deleting the texts, including that he had deleted them for more storage space, and for security reasons as his phone had previously been "hacked". Coveney's explanations were criticised by many members of the Dáil, including by members of government coalition members Fianna Fáil. Senator Catherine Ardagh of Fianna Fáil stated it "beggars belief that important text messages related to work matters would be deleted" while Fianna Fáil TD James Lawless said "Modern phones have ample storage without having to frequently delete. I would also question to what extent is there an obligation on those subject to Freedom of Information to retain such information". On 6 September, the Department of Foreign Affairs released a collection of over one hundred documents in response to Freedom of Information requests relating to the appointment of a special envoy. Coveney appeared at the Committee on Foreign Affairs the following day and apologised for the "political fiasco" surrounding the role.

Zappone was invited to appear before the Oireachtas Committee on Foreign Affairs and Defence, but chose not to attend. As a US citizen and resident, the committee had no power to compel her attendance.

== Vote of no confidence in Simon Coveney ==
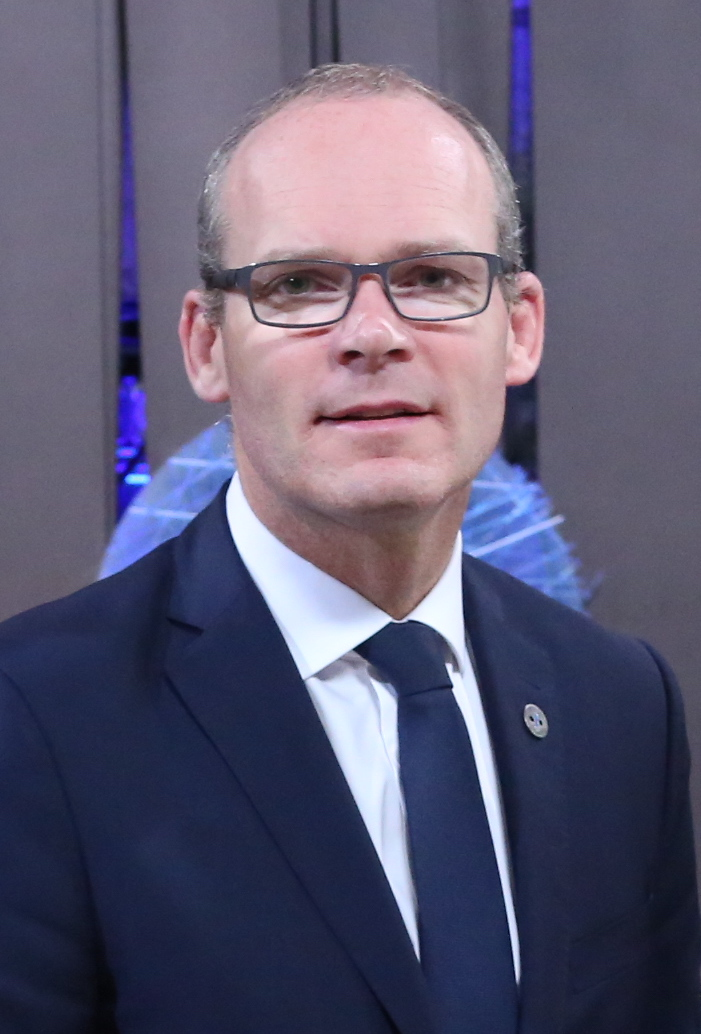
The Zappone Affair led to a motion of no confidence being brought against Simon Coveney

On 15 September, upon the return of Dáil Éireann from a summer recess, a motion of no confidence was brought forward by Sinn Féin against Simon Coveney as a direct result of the Zappone appointment and his subsequent handling of the affair in the aftermath of the details becoming public. High-profile Fianna Fáil member Marc MacSharry resigned from the parliamentary party in order to vote against Coveney. Regardless, Coveney survived the motion 92 votes to 59 as the government parties enforced the whip on the vote, while Independent TDs generally sided with the government on the vote as well.

== See also ==
- Oireachtas Golf Society scandal
