= Katherine Zappone =

American-born Irish politician (born 1953)

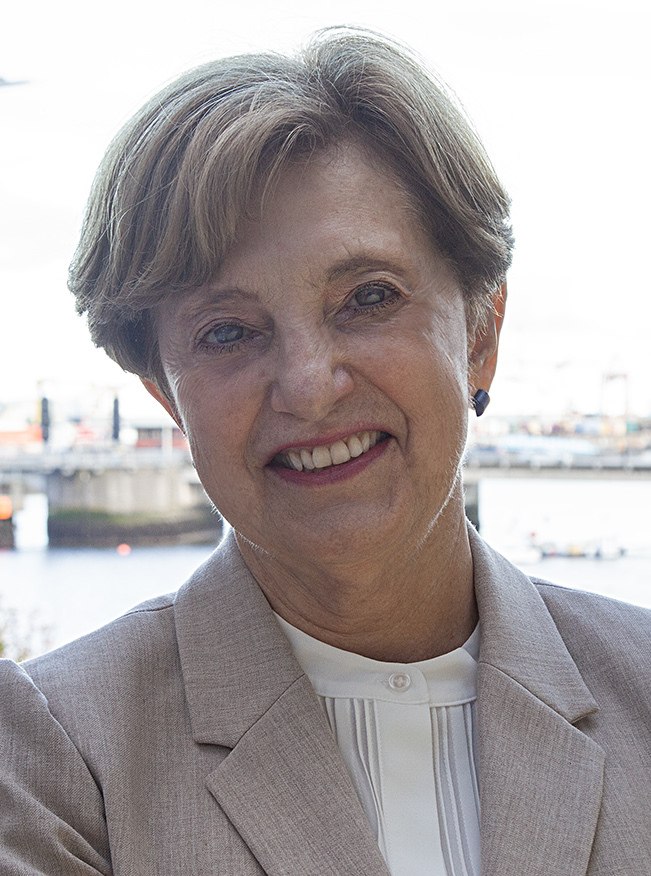
- Zappone in 2024

Minister for Children and Youth Affairs
- In office 6 May 2016 – 27 June 2020
- Taoiseach: Enda Kenny; Leo Varadkar
- Preceded by: James Reilly
- Succeeded by: Roderic O'Gorman (Children, Equality, Disability, Integration and Youth)

Teachta Dála
- In office February 2016 – February 2020
- Constituency: Dublin South-West

Senator
- In office 25 May 2011 – 26 February 2016
- Constituency: Nominated by the Taoiseach

Personal details
- Born: 25 November 1953 (age 72) Seattle, Washington, U.S.
- Citizenship: United States; Ireland (since 1995)
- Party: Democratic (US); Independent (Ireland)
- Spouse: Ann Louise Gilligan (m. 2003; died 2017)
- Education: Boston College; Catholic University of America; University College Dublin
- Website: katherinezappone.ie

Katherine Zappone (/zæˈpoʊn/; born 25 November 1953) is an American-Irish independent politician who served as Minister for Children and Youth Affairs from May 2016 to June 2020. She was a Teachta Dála (TD) for the Dublin South-West constituency from 2016 to 2020. She previously served as a Senator from 2011 to 2016, after being nominated by the Taoiseach.

She was nominated by the Taoiseach Enda Kenny to the 24th Seanad in 2011, having been recommended by Eamon Gilmore, the leader of Fine Gael's coalition partners, the Labour Party. With her Seanad nomination, she became the first openly lesbian member of the Oireachtas and the first member in a recognised same-sex relationship.

She was elected to the Dáil for the Dublin South-West constituency at the 2016 general election, becoming the first openly lesbian TD and, by her own reckoning, the world's 32nd lesbian to be elected to a national parliament. In May 2016, after a delay in government formation, due to prolonged talks, Zappone became Ireland's first openly lesbian government minister and the first minister to have been openly gay at the time of appointment to cabinet, when Taoiseach Enda Kenny appointed her as the Minister for Children and Youth Affairs. She lost her seat at the 2020 general election and continued to serve as a minister until the formation of a new government in June 2020.

== Personal life ==
Born in Seattle, Washington, in 1953, Zappone was educated at Boston College (PhD), the Catholic University of America (MA) and University College Dublin (MBA). She became an Irish citizen in 1995. She and her wife, Ann Louise Gilligan, founded An Cosán which supports individuals and communities to actively engage in the process of social change through transformative education. In Zappone and Gilligan v. Revenue Commissioners (2006), they unsuccessfully sought recognition in the High Court for their Canadian marriage in Ireland. Zappone was a member of the Irish Human Rights Commission, chief executive of the National Women's Council of Ireland, and a lecturer in the fields of ethics, theology, and education at Trinity College Dublin. Though they were already married in Canada, Zappone proposed to Ann Louise Gilligan on air as the positive result in the same-sex marriage referendum became known. Gilligan died in June 2017.

Zappone began a new relationship in 2021 with a South African woman named Jennifer, whom she met while living in the US. The couple later moved back to Ireland.

== An Cosán ==
An Cosán is an organisation in Jobstown, Tallaght, which offers adult education and other services to women from disadvantaged areas, and is Ireland's largest community education organisation. It currently supports over 1,000 families annually. According to The Irish Times, An Cosán "was established by Ann Louise Gilligan and Katherine Zappone with the intention of bringing valuable community-based education to the Dublin suburb. In 2012, An Cosán attempted to track the progress of 1,500 past students and found 1,200 were employed."

Speaking at an event for International Women's Day in 2010, Social and Family Affairs Minister Mary Hanafin, paid tribute to the work done by the women in An Cosán. "They are involved in education courses and communication and childcare and bettering themselves and their children, and they are making a big contribution". Speaking about founding An Cosán, Zappone said "Imagine creating something like An Cosán together with the community. You really feel like you're bringing about some change for the good. Why wouldn't you want to do it?"

=== Preschools ===
An Cosán also runs Fledglings, which operates eight preschools around the country – mostly in disadvantaged areas – which provide education and care to more than 250 children. Senator Lynn Ruane is a graduate, who at age 16, was a participant on the first Young Women's Programme; Ruane has said that: "An Cosán had its finger on the pulse and responded to a surge of teenage pregnancy in the west Tallaght area, taking into account of what was needed to support young mothers and their participation. Key in that was Rainbow House where my daughter, Jordanne, started out the early years in her life and I began to heal, learn and believe again. An Cosán was the beginning and remains the foundation of my journey so far. Somebody created an opportunity for me, met my needs, and empowered me to progress."

== Zappone v. Revenue Commissioners ==
In November 2004, Zappone and Gilligan were granted leave by the High Court, to pursue a claim to have their September 2003 Vancouver marriage recognised for the filing of joint tax returns in Ireland. The case was heard in October 2006. The judgment was delivered in December 2006. and found that common law and the Irish constitution had envisaged marriage to be between a man and a woman.

The case was appealed to the Supreme Court in February 2007. It came before the Supreme Court in 2012, although returned to the High Court to challenge different elements of law, specifically the Civil Registration Act 2004 and Civil Partnership and Certain Rights and Obligations of Cohabitants Act 2010.

== Political career ==
=== Seanad Éireann (2011–2016) ===
Nominated by Taoiseach Enda Kenny, to the 24th Seanad in 2011, Zappone was a member of the Committee on Justice, Defence and Equality.

In December 2014, she voted against the Water Services Bill, and spoke about the "people's right to water in a fair, affordable, efficient and effective manner". She also took part in a protest in Tallaght opposing the government's handling of water charges, at which she "noted that some were not opposed to water charge but had serious concerns about the way in which they were being implemented and the speed at which they were being rolled out", and said "there was public anger about the mistakes made relating to Irish Water".

Zappone also spoke about the housing problem in South Dublin, highlighting that "there were 173 people homeless in the South Dublin County Council area. She said "either the Government analyses of these problems are wrong or incomplete or the political ideologies that direct its solutions are insipid, vacuous of original vision, or simply outdated"."

Zappone began working on amendments to the Gender Recognition Bill. After Zappone sought to amend the Gender Recognition Legislation, Minister of State Kevin Humphreys, accepted the principle of a Seanad amendment to have the legislation recognising the identity of transgender people reviewed. During Seanad debate, Zappone highlighted that it was regrettable it had taken successive Irish governments more than 20 years to legislate for gender recognition.

Zappone stated that "the Tallaght Garda District must receive its fair share of new recruits and vehicles being made available to the force in the coming weeks". The following month she confirmed that she had received confirmation that the local Garda district was to receive 13 new cars after communication with the Garda Commissioner Nóirín O'Sullivan.

In April 2015, Zappone raised the One-Parent Family Payment changes in the Seanad, highlighting that "single parents want their parental responsibility recognised, while some want access to full-time education with proper State support for their children".

=== Marriage Equality referendum ===
Zappone was a prominent campaigner for the Yes campaign in Ireland's marriage equality referendum, featuring on an RTÉ Primetime debate, helping YesEquality as a voluntary adviser, taking part in debates, and campaigning for a Yes vote. On 22 May 2015, she spoke about how she believed Irish people would "vote Yes for equality; for a Republic of equals, a Republic of love". On 23 May 2015, Zappone asked her wife Ann Louise Gilligan live on air to remarry her in Ireland now that it had voted yes to marriage equality. She described how she was "feeling emotional from the top all the way down to my toes".

=== Dáil Éireann (2016–2020) ===
In June 2015, Zappone announced she would contest the next general election as an Independent candidate in the Dublin South-West constituency. Confirming her decision to run, Senator Zappone added: "Since the end of last year, it has been a privilege to engage with local people in Dublin South West ahead of the Marriage Referendum. Together with my spouse, Ann Louise Gilligan, and the team of Yes Equality supporters we received a fantastic welcome on the doorsteps, at shopping centres, and at community events. It was clear that people in Dublin South West believe in equality; however, it was also evident that they are weary of old school politics which has led to years of austerity, unfair cuts, and disillusionment."

She was the final candidate elected to the Dáil for the Dublin South-West constituency in the 2016 general election, following a full recount. In the third round of voting for Taoiseach, Zappone voted in favour of Enda Kenny.

Zappone was embroiled in controversy after being elected as allegations surfaced regarding her claiming excessive amounts for mileage expenses. On 24 March 2016, The Sunday Times reported that the former Senator stood to earn €80,000 over the next five years from these expenses as she claimed to live more than 25 km from Leinster House. The paper, however, reported AA’s Route Planner puts the distance at less than 22 km. During her time in the Seanad, Zappone was paid expenses on the basis that she lived farther than 25 km from Leinster House. She submitted documentation to the Oireachteas claiming her normal place of residence was farther than 25 km from the Dail.

In May 2016, Taoiseach Enda Kenny appointed her as Minister for Children and Youth Affairs in the Government of the 32nd Dáil, and she was reappointed to the position when Leo Varadkar became Taoiseach in June 2017.

=== 2018 abortion referendum ===
Zappone had said that she believed the Eighth Amendment should be repealed, and that abortion should be available in Ireland. She was initially the only member of cabinet to have unequivocally spoken out in favour of repeal of the Eighth and legalisation of abortion, arguing that the Eighth Amendment "oppresses us with the burden of choicelessness", and that "as long as the Constitution treats a foetus as equal to a woman, her autonomy can be nothing more than a myth". In December 2017, she gave a lecture at Dublin City University, in which she argued for the full repeal of the Eighth Amendment and the introduction of "safe, legal and freely available" abortion including abortion on request up to at least 12 weeks.

After the result of the May 2018 referendum, Zappone thanked the women who had shared their stories of how they were affected by the Eighth Amendment, "It's because of their willingness to tell their stories that they were able to change the hearts and the minds of the citizens but also many of the politicians too."

=== American politics (2020) ===
Following the loss of her seat at the 2020 Irish general election, Zappone moved back to Seattle to work as a full-time volunteer for Joe Biden's presidential campaign in the 2020 United States presidential election, then to New York.

=== Controversy over appointment as Special Envoy ===
In July 2021, it was announced that Zappone was to be appointed to the newly created position of "Special Envoy to the UN for Freedom of Opinion and Expression". It subsequently emerged that the proposed appointment had not been flagged in advance of the Cabinet meeting where it was proposed by Minister Simon Coveney, raising the concerns of the Taoiseach, Micheál Martin. However, he did not block the appointment, attracting criticism from within government, the opposition and the public, with Sinn Féin describing the appointment as "cronyism".

In the following days, it was reported that Zappone had lobbied for the creation of and appointment to the part-time position, which was not openly advertised or subject to a competition. Further controversy arose when it was reported that shortly prior to the announcement of her appointment, Zappone had hosted a party for 50 guests, including politicians such as Leo Varadkar, at the Merrion Hotel, while the COVID-19 pandemic in the Republic of Ireland was ongoing. Comparisons were made between the party and the Golfgate scandal from earlier in the pandemic. On 4 August 2021, Zappone announced that she would not take up the envoy role, saying "While I am honoured to have been appointed by the Government to be the Special Envoy on Freedom of Opinion and Expression, it is clear that criticism of the appointment process has impacted the legitimacy of the role itself. It is my conviction that a Special Envoy role can only be of real value to Ireland and to the global community if the appointment is acceptable to all parties."

In September 2021, she was invited to appear before the Oireachtas Committee on Foreign Affairs and Defence but refused to attend. As a US citizen, albeit with Irish citizenship, and resident, the committee had no power to compel her attendance.

=== 2025 Seanad election ===
Zappone was an independent candidate for the Dublin University constituency at the 2025 Seanad election, but was not elected.

== Publications ==
- The Hope for Wholeness: A Spirituality for Feminists, by Katherine Zappone, (1991).
- Re-Thinking Identity: the Challenge of Diversity, by Dr. Katherine Zappone, (2003).
- Our Lives Out Loud: In Pursuit of Justice and Equality, by Ann Louise Gilligan and Dr. Katherine Zappone, (2008).

Political offices
Preceded by James Reilly	Minister for Children and Youth Affairs; 2016–2020	Succeeded by Roderic O'Gorman as Minister for Children, Equality, Disability, Integration and Youth

Dáil	Election	Deputy (Party)	Deputy (Party)	Deputy (Party)	Deputy (Party)	Deputy (Party)
13th	1948	Seán MacBride (CnaP)	Peadar Doyle (FG)	Bernard Butler (FF)	Michael O'Higgins (FG)	Robert Briscoe (FF)
14th	1951	Seán MacBride (CnaP)	Peadar Doyle (FG)	Bernard Butler (FF)	Michael ffrench-O'Carroll (Ind.)	Robert Briscoe (FF)
15th	1954	Seán MacBride (CnaP)	Peadar Doyle (FG)	Bernard Butler (FF)	Michael O'Higgins (FG)	Robert Briscoe (FF)
15th	1956 by-election	Seán MacBride (CnaP)	Noel Lemass (FF)	Bernard Butler (FF)	Michael O'Higgins (FG)	Robert Briscoe (FF)
16th	1957	James Carroll (Ind.)	Noel Lemass (FF)	Bernard Butler (FF)	Michael O'Higgins (FG)	Robert Briscoe (FF)
16th	1959 by-election	James Carroll (Ind.)	Noel Lemass (FF)	Richie Ryan (FG)	Michael O'Higgins (FG)	Robert Briscoe (FF)
17th	1961	James Carroll (Ind.)	Noel Lemass (FF)	Richie Ryan (FG)	James O'Keeffe (FG)	Robert Briscoe (FF)
18th	1965	John O'Connell (Lab)	Noel Lemass (FF)	Richie Ryan (FG)	Joseph Dowling (FF)	Ben Briscoe (FF)
19th	1969	John O'Connell (Lab)	Noel Lemass (FF)	Seán Dunne (Lab)	Joseph Dowling (FF)	4 seats 1969–1977
19th	1970 by-election	John O'Connell (Lab)	Noel Lemass (FF)	Seán Sherwin (FF)	Joseph Dowling (FF)	4 seats 1969–1977
20th	1973	John O'Connell (Lab)	Noel Lemass (FF)	Declan Costello (FG)	Joseph Dowling (FF)	4 seats 1969–1977
20th	1976 by-election	John O'Connell (Lab)	Brendan Halligan (Lab)	Declan Costello (FG)	Joseph Dowling (FF)	4 seats 1969–1977
21st	1977	Constituency abolished. See Dublin Ballyfermot				

Dáil	Election	Deputy (Party)	Deputy (Party)	Deputy (Party)	Deputy (Party)	Deputy (Party)
22nd	1981	Seán Walsh (FF)	Larry McMahon (FG)	Mary Harney (FF)	Mervyn Taylor (Lab)	4 seats 1981–1992
23rd	1982 (Feb)	Seán Walsh (FF)	Larry McMahon (FG)	Mary Harney (FF)	Mervyn Taylor (Lab)	4 seats 1981–1992
24th	1982 (Nov)	Seán Walsh (FF)	Michael O'Leary (FG)	Mary Harney (FF)	Mervyn Taylor (Lab)	4 seats 1981–1992
25th	1987	Seán Walsh (FF)	Chris Flood (FF)	Mary Harney (PDs)	Mervyn Taylor (Lab)	4 seats 1981–1992
26th	1989	Pat Rabbitte (WP)	Chris Flood (FF)	Mary Harney (PDs)	Mervyn Taylor (Lab)	4 seats 1981–1992
27th	1992	Pat Rabbitte (DL)	Chris Flood (FF)	Mary Harney (PDs)	Mervyn Taylor (Lab)	Éamonn Walsh (Lab)
28th	1997	Pat Rabbitte (DL)	Chris Flood (FF)	Mary Harney (PDs)	Conor Lenihan (FF)	Brian Hayes (FG)
29th	2002	Pat Rabbitte (Lab)	Charlie O'Connor (FF)	Seán Crowe (SF)	Conor Lenihan (FF)	4 seats 2002–2016
30th	2007	Pat Rabbitte (Lab)	Charlie O'Connor (FF)	Brian Hayes (FG)	Conor Lenihan (FF)	4 seats 2002–2016
31st	2011	Pat Rabbitte (Lab)	Eamonn Maloney (Lab)	Brian Hayes (FG)	Seán Crowe (SF)	4 seats 2002–2016
31st	2014 by-election	Pat Rabbitte (Lab)	Eamonn Maloney (Lab)	Paul Murphy (AAA)	Seán Crowe (SF)	4 seats 2002–2016
32nd	2016	Colm Brophy (FG)	John Lahart (FF)	Paul Murphy (AAA–PBP)	Seán Crowe (SF)	Katherine Zappone (Ind.)
33rd	2020	Colm Brophy (FG)	John Lahart (FF)	Paul Murphy (S–PBP)	Seán Crowe (SF)	Francis Noel Duffy (GP)
34th	2024	Colm Brophy (FG)	John Lahart (FF)	Paul Murphy (PBP–S)	Seán Crowe (SF)	Ciarán Ahern (Lab)
