= John Cheyne (physician) =

British physician, surgeon and author (1777–1836)

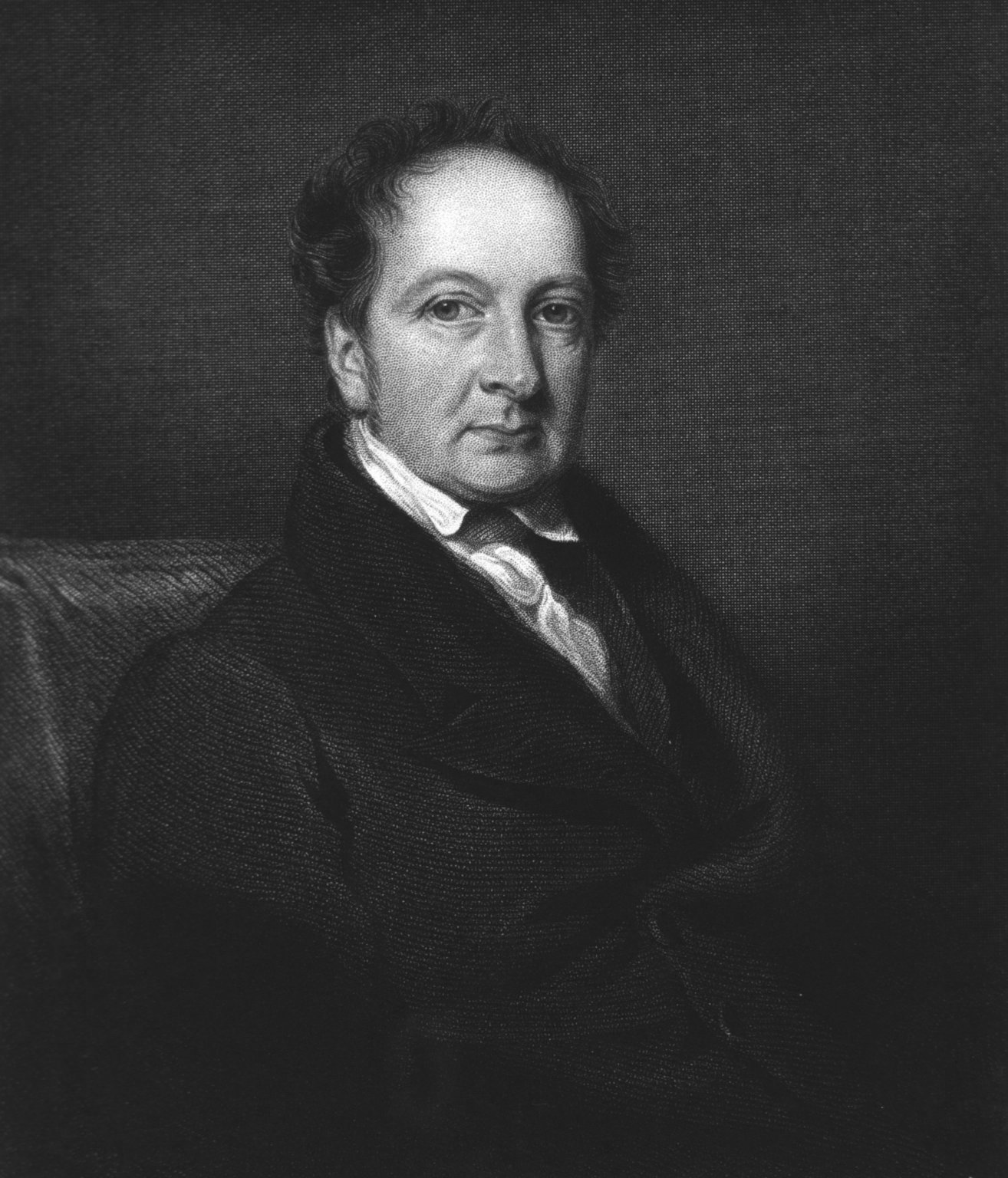
- John Cheyne; Engraving by John Cochran after a portrait by W. Deey
- Born: 3 February 1777; Leith, Scotland
- Died: 31 January 1836 (aged 58); Buckinghamshire, England
- Education: Edinburgh University
- Known for: Cheyne–Stokes respiration
- Scientific career
- Fields: medicine

John Cheyne FRSE FKQCPI (3 February 1777 – 31 January 1836) was a British physician, surgeon, Professor of Medicine in the Royal College of Surgeons in Ireland (RCSI) and author of monographs on a number of medical topics. He was one of the people to identify Cheyne–Stokes respiration.

== Life ==
Cheyne was born in Leith, Edinburgh, Scotland, the son of Dr John Cheyne, a surgeon. The family lived at New Key (Quay) in the middle of the Shore. He was educated at Leith Grammar School and then the High School in Edinburgh.

Having grown up around medical practice, Cheyne was able to enter Edinburgh University at the age of 15, graduating as a doctor at 18 years old. He joined the army and worked as a surgeon with an artillery corps. He was present at the Battle of Vinegar Hill. Cheyne rejoined his father's practice four years later in 1799.

Ten years later, Cheyne moved to Dublin, Ireland and in 1811 began working at the Meath Hospital. He was appointed Professor of Medicine in the Royal College of Surgeons in Ireland (RCSI) in 1813. In 1814 he was elected to the Royal Society of Edinburgh. Cheyne taught war medicine and was appointed Physician General to British forces in Ireland in 1820. He gained the Fellowship of the King and Queen's Royal College of Physicians of Ireland in 1824. He retired to England in 1831 following a course of ill health, and died at his country estate in Sherington, Buckinghamshire on 31 January 1836.

Cheyne wrote a number of books, including Essays of Diseases of Children in 1801. He was also the author of an early treatise on the larynx in 1809, Pathology of the Membrane of the Larynx and Bronchia.

With Francis Barker, he published a two-volume work on fever epidemics in Ireland in 1821.

== Publications ==
- Essays on the Diseases of Children: With Cases and Dissections (1802)
- The Pathology of the Membrane of the Larynx and Bronchia (1809)
- Cases of Apoplexy and Lethargy: With Observations Upon the Comatose Diseases (1812)
- Essays on Partial Derangement of the Mind in Supposed Connexion with Religion (1843)
