= Francis Barker =

- Born: 1773; Waterford
- Died: 8 October 1859 (aged 86); Wellington Road, Dublin
- Education: Edinburgh University
- Scientific career
- Fields: medicine

Francis Barker (1773–1859) was an Irish medical doctor known for his work in tracking fever epidemics.

== Life ==
Born in Waterford, Barker was one of six children of William Barker (1731–88) and Elizabeth Barker (née Acheson). Barker was educated in Edinburgh during which time he got to know Sir Walter Scott. He graduating as an MD in 1795, with his thesis studying the work of Galvani that suggested the presence of nervous fluid with dynamical electricity.

Barker established what is believed to be the first fever hospital in Ireland in 1810. He was Professor of Chemistry at Trinity College, Dublin (1808–50), and Secretary to the Irish Board of Health (1820–32).

Barker married Emma (née Conolly), the daughter of the vicar of Donard, County Wicklow in 1804. They had four daughters and a son William (1810–73), who went on to be a professor of chemistry (1850–73) at the Royal College of Science for Ireland.

== Works ==
Barker edited the Dublin Pharmacopeia from 1826 and in collaboration with John Cheyne wrote An account of the rise, progress and decline of the fever lately epidemical in Ireland (2 vols., 1821). Barker's work with Cheyne highlighted the link between poverty and low hygiene standards in the spread of typhus in 1816–19.
