= Imelda Henry =

Irish former politician (born 1967)

Senator
- In office 25 May 2011 – 8 June 2016
- Constituency: Industrial and Commercial Panel

Personal details
- Born: 5 March 1967 (age 59) County Sligo, Ireland
- Party: Fine Gael
- Spouse: Aiden Meehan
- Children: 2

Imelda Henry (born 5 March 1967) is an Irish Fine Gael politician and former senator. She was elected to the 24th Seanad in April 2011 on the Industrial and Commercial Panel. and lost her seat at the following election in April 2016.

She was a member of Sligo County Council from 2004 to 2011 for the Strandhill local electoral area. Her father, Peter Henry, had previously been a member of the Council between 1985 and 1999.

She was a candidate for the Sligo–North Leitrim constituency at the 2007 general election but was not elected. She also unsuccessfully contested the 2007 Seanad election.

She was the Fine Gael Seanad spokesperson on Children between 2011 and 2016.

In August 2020, she attended a golf party in County Galway which breached the COVID-19 guidelines.
