= An Cosán =

Irish community education organisation

An Cosán (Irish: [ənˠ ˈkɔsˠaːnˠ]; "The Path") is an organisation based in Jobstown, Tallaght, which offers adult education and other services to women from disadvantaged areas, and is Ireland's largest community education organisation. It was founded by Katherine Zappone and Ann Louise Gilligan.

It currently supports over 1,000 families annually. According to The Irish Times, An Cosán "was established by Ann Louise Gilligan and Katherine Zappone with the intention of bringing valuable community-based education to the Dublin suburb. In 2012 An Cosán attempted to track the progress of 1,500 past students and found 1,200 were employed."

Speaking at an event for International Women's Day in 2010, then Social and Family Affairs Minister Mary Hanafin paid tribute to the work done by the people in An Cosan. "They are involved in education courses and communication and childcare and bettering themselves and their children, and they are making a big contribution". Speaking about founding An Cosán, Zappone said "Imagine creating something like An Cosan together with the community. You really feel like you're bringing about some change for the good. Why wouldn't you want to do it?"

== Preschools ==
An Cosán also runs Fledglings, which operates eight preschools around the country – mostly in disadvantaged areas – which provide education and care to more than 250 children. A notable alumnae of An Cosán is Senator Lynn Ruane, former president of Trinity College Students' Union, who at age 16, was a participant on the first Young Women's Programme; Ruane has said that: "An Cosán had its finger on the pulse and responded to a surge of teenage pregnancy in the west Tallaght area, taking into account of what was needed to support young mothers and their participation. Key in that was Rainbow House where my daughter, Jordanne, started out the early years in her life and I began to heal, learn and believe again. An Cosán was the beginning and remains the foundation of my journey so far. Somebody created an opportunity for me, met my needs and empowered me to progress."

== Higher Education Courses ==
An Cosan run undergraduate degree programmes accredited by IT Carlow, graduation takes place at the Jobstown An Cosan, and at the nearby St Thomas' Church.
