= Oireachtas Golf Society scandal =

Political scandal in Ireland

Coordinates: 53.488689°N 10.017489°W

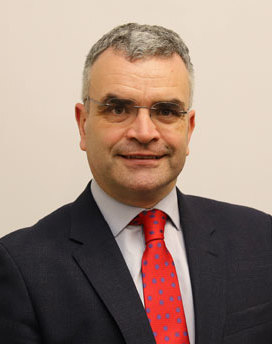
Dara Calleary

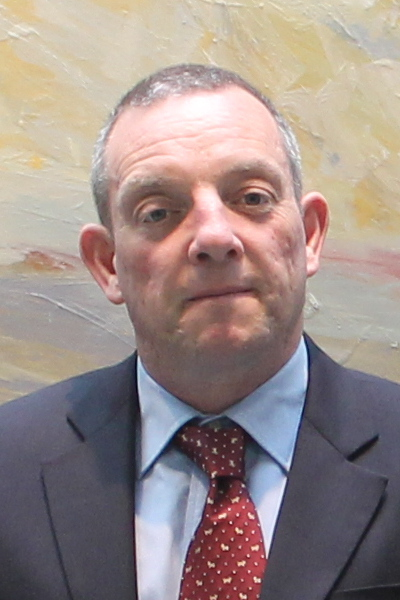
Jerry Buttimer

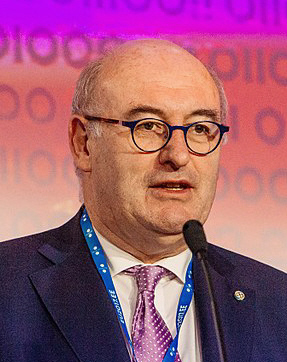
Phil Hogan

Calleary, Buttimer and Hogan all attended the event, and subsequently resigned from their main political offices.

The Oireachtas Golf Society scandal, also known informally as "Golfgate", was a political scandal in Ireland involving past and present members of that country's parliament, the Oireachtas, who attended a gathering of the Oireachtas Golf Society in Clifden, County Galway, on 19 August 2020.

The gathering took place during public health guidelines that had been issued in response to the COVID-19 pandemic in Ireland. A total of 81 guests attended a dinner organised by the society, including a number of high-profile Oireachtas members; the European Commissioner for Trade, Phil Hogan; and a Supreme Court judge, Séamus Woulfe.

Following the publication of the story on 20 August by the Irish Examiner, there was widespread public anger across Ireland that attendees had allegedly contravened restrictions that had been drafted by the ruling Fianna Fáil–Fine Gael–Green Party coalition government, one of whose ministers was in attendance at the dinner. It was later determined that the event did not breach the rules.

The scandal resulted in the resignations of Hogan; the Minister for Agriculture, Food and the Marine and Deputy Leader of Fianna Fáil, Dara Calleary; and the Leas-Chathaoirleach of Seanad Éireann, Jerry Buttimer. It also resulted in calls for a number of other resignations, and the affair was seen to have shaken public confidence in the coalition government. Four people were later prosecuted for their roles as organisers of the event. The Court acquitted them of all charges, saying that the event had been organised within the rules and with due care to public health.

== Background ==
Under the third phase of a roadmap issued by the government for reopening the national economy after the first peak of the COVID-19 pandemic, indoor gatherings of up to 50 people had been permissible since 29 June when conducted in line with public health advice.

However, in response to an increase in confirmed cases, Taoiseach Micheál Martin announced on 18 August that more restrictive measures would be reintroduced across the country until 13 September, in an effort to limit the spread of the virus. Among the restrictions announced were a limit on indoor gatherings and events to six people from no more than three households, with exemptions granted for weddings, certain religious ceremonies and cultural facilities, provided appropriate protective measures could be maintained.

On 20 August, Irish Examiner journalists Aoife-Grace Moore and Paul Hosford reported on an event organised by the Oireachtas Golf Society that took place over two days in Clifden, County Galway, including a dinner on 19 August at the Station House Hotel. The event, organised by the society's captain, Independent TD Noel Grealish, and its president, former Fianna Fáil Senator Donie Cassidy, was organised as a celebration of the 50th anniversary of the society, as well as a commemoration of the death of former Fianna Fáil MEP, Mark Killilea Jnr, in 2018. It consisted of games of golf and a gala dinner. The golfing competitions, held over the two days at Connemara Golf Links in Ballyconneely, were won by Niall Blaney and Gerry Brady. The dinner was held in a single room with a removable dividing partition, splitting the 81 attendees into 45 and 36 people on either side in an effort to enforce social distancing. Newspaper reports stated that not only had social distancing not been properly observed at the dinner, but public health advice had generally not been observed.

It was also reported that former independent TD and Monaghan County Council member, Paudge Connolly, had attended the dinner despite playing in another golf event in Spain just nine days previously. This meant that he could not have been compliant with the 14-day period of restricted movements that was mandatory for people entering Ireland from Spain, under travel restrictions enforced by the government.

== Notable attendees ==
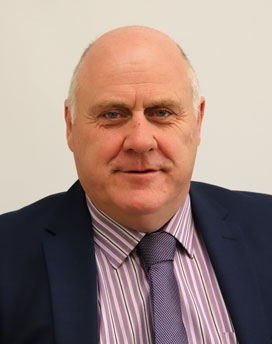
Noel Grealish, who served as captain of the Oireachtas Golf Society at the time of the event. He was subsequently prosecuted for his role in organising the event.

- Dara Calleary, Minister for Agriculture, Food and the Marine, deputy leader of Fianna Fáil and TD for Mayo
- Donie Cassidy, former Fianna Fáil Senator, former Leader of the Seanad and outgoing president of the society
- Noel Grealish, Independent TD for Galway West and the captain of the society
- Phil Hogan, European Commissioner for Trade, and former cabinet minister and Fine Gael TD for Carlow–Kilkenny
- Séamus Woulfe, Supreme Court judge and former Attorney General
- Seán O'Rourke, former RTÉ broadcaster
- Jerry Buttimer, Leas-Chathaoirleach of Seanad Éireann and Fine Gael senator
- Niall Blaney, Paul Daly and Aidan Davitt, Fianna Fáil senators
- Paddy Burke and John Cummins, Fine Gael senators
- Paudge Connolly, sitting member of Monaghan County Council and former independent TD for Cavan–Monaghan
- Noel Dempsey and Frank Fahey, former Fianna Fáil TDs and cabinet ministers
- Áine Brady, former Fianna Fáil TD and minister of state
- Gerry Brady, former Fianna Fáil TD
- Gerry Reynolds, former Fine Gael senator and TD
- Brian Hayes, head of the Banking and Payments Federation of Ireland, and former Fine Gael minister of state and MEP for Dublin,
- Imelda Henry and Cáit Keane, former Fine Gael senators
- Lorraine Higgins, former Labour Party senator
- Pat McCartan, former Circuit Court judge and Workers' Party TD, and vice-captain of the society
- Michael Harty, former independent TD for Clare and chair of the Oireachtas Committee on Health
- John Flaherty, Captain of the Guard in Leinster House and a civil servant with responsibility for health and safety in the Oireachtas, including COVID-19 precautions
- Lahcen Mahraoui, Ambassador of Morocco to Ireland
- Donagh Killilea, Fianna Fáil member of Galway County Council
- Martin Brett, sitting Fine Gael member of Kilkenny County Council
- Enda McGloin, sitting Fine Gael member of Leitrim County Council

== Reaction and consequences ==
Following the breaking of the story, the gathering was criticised heavily across Irish society.

The Taoiseach, Micheál Martin, was described as "furious" about the event, and in particular by the attendance of Dara Calleary. Calleary resigned as Minister for Agriculture, Food and the Marine on 21 August, stating in an interview to MidWest Radio that "[he] made a big mistake. [He] shouldn't have gone to the function. [He] didn't want to let people down and [he takes] responsibility for that mistake". He elaborated by saying his actions had undermined the work of frontline workers in Ireland and he was deeply sorry for having done so.

Calleary's resignation made him the second Minister for Agriculture, Food and the Marine to lose his job in less than two months, following the sacking of Barry Cowen on 14 July 2020 for a controversy surrounding driving under the influence of alcohol. Coverage of Calleary's resignation was covered not just domestically, but also internationally, with the story featuring in The New York Times, BBC News, The Guardian, Euronews, The Times, Politico, Le Parisien, Frankfurter Allgemeine Zeitung, and Ouest-France. In addition to his ministerial role, Calleary resigned as deputy leader and national secretary of Fianna Fáil.

As well as the resignations of Calleary and Leas-Cathaoirleach of Seanad Éireann, Jerry Buttimer, six senators who attended the event also lost the party whip as punishment.

Speaking on RTÉ News: Six One on Friday 21 August, Martin would not comment on the position of judge Séamus Woulfe – citing the need for legislature not to interfere with the judiciary in line with the Constitution of Ireland – but while he suggested that Phil Hogan should apologise for attending the event, Martin declined to comment on whether he should resign, saying that Hogan's position was a matter for the European Commission. Following initial reluctance, Hogan apologised for his attendance at the event on 22 August.

President of Sinn Féin and Leader of the Opposition, Mary Lou McDonald, heavily criticised both the gathering and the government, stating that the government had "descended into new levels of chaos". McDonald had requested that the Dáil be recalled from its summer recess, but this was initially rejected by Martin. In response, McDonald stated that Martin was wrong, that the government had lost its direction and that it needed to be held to account. McDonald also said that she had been unaware of the existence of an Oireachtas golf society, and questioned the ethics of an organisation that allowed wealthy donors to interact with members of the Oireachtas.

The Leader of the Labour Party, Alan Kelly, said that not only had the government lost the confidence of the people, but also that he had rarely seen such public anger in response to a political issue as to the event. The co-leader of the Social Democrats, Catherine Murphy, called the event "inexcusable" and asked for the Dáil to be reconvened.

While Martin resisted calls on 21 August to recall the Dáil – which was on summer break – the government announced on Sunday 23 August that the Dáil would return sooner than planned, most likely by Tuesday 15 September.

The Garda Síochána announced on 21 August that they would be investigating the event to see if it breached the Health Act 1947, which was amended on 20 March 2020 to include public health regulations pertaining to the COVID-19 pandemic.

In the immediate wake of the scandal, Ceann Comhairle Seán Ó Fearghaíl requested that the Oireachtas Golf Society be disbanded with immediate effect.

On 22 August the Garda Commissioner, Drew Harris, used discretionary powers under the 2005 Garda Síochána Act to inform the government that Hogan had been stopped by the Garda Síochána in County Kildare for using a mobile phone while driving – a criminal offence punishable by three penalty points and an €80 fine – on his way to Clifden. Hogan's very presence in the county was an issue in itself, as it was under a local lockdown at the time, meaning that Hogan would have been entitled to travel to the county for essential purposes such as work, but not to leave again for non-essential purposes such as attending the golf dinner. In light of this, Martin and the Tánaiste, Leo Varadkar, changed their stance on Hogan retaining his European Commission portfolio; Martin publicly suggested that Hogan should "reconsider his position", and the President of the European Commission, Ursula von der Leyen, requested a detailed report from Hogan on the matter. The Minister for Housing, Local Government and Heritage, Darragh O'Brien, called on Hogan to resign, while the Minister of State for European Affairs, Thomas Byrne, stated that what he called Hogan's "unclear answers" on the issue damaged confidence in politics and the EU, and that President von der Leyen must consider this when considering Hogan's report.

It was announced on 24 August that the Supreme Court had requested a former Chief Justice, Susan Denham, to report on Woulfe's attendance at the dinner, including the question of whether he should have accepted the invitation and whether "he should in all the circumstances have left the hotel in light of the situation prevailing". On the same day, it was also reported that former Taoiseach and Leader of Fine Gael, Enda Kenny, had participated in the golf competitions arranged as part of the event, but declined to participate in the gala dinner, telling others that he thought it was "a bad idea" and would "send out the wrong signal to the general public". RTÉ announced that further projects involving Seán O'Rourke, which had been planned, would not now proceed.

On 25 August, Hogan published a timeline of his movements since his he arrival in Ireland from Brussels on 31 July, including new details of a trip to Adare to play golf on 13 August. It was noted that Hogan was admitted to a Dublin hospital on 5 August, where he tested negative for COVID-19; he was discharged from hospital and returned to a temporary residence in County Kildare the following day. On 7 August, hours before a local lockdown was enforced in Kildare, Hogan travelled to County Kilkenny; from there, he travelled to Dublin for essential work purposes on 12 August. After playing golf in Adare on 13 August, he returned to Kilkenny, and travelled to Clifden via Kildare on 17 August. Hogan participated in the golf competitions on 18 and 19 August and attended the gala dinner, before returning to his temporary residence in Kildare on 21 August, and to Brussels the following day. Following publication of this timeline, reports appeared in the media claiming that Hogan had been seen at public restaurants with other individuals during this period, including on the evening of his arrival in Ireland, and that he had made a further trip to County Roscommon on 17 August for social purposes; these previously undisclosed details were seen as contradicting Hogan's own timeline.

Martin, Varadkar and the Leader of the Green Party, Eamon Ryan, released a joint statement on 25 August, stating that while it is clear Hogan breached COVID-19 public health guidelines, they welcomed his apology. Facing increased pressure in both Brussels and Dublin, Phil Hogan resigned as Trade Commissioner on 26 August.

On 9 November, correspondence between Mr Justice Frank Clarke and Mr Justice Woulfe were published in which the Chief Justice reprimanded Woulfe for his response to the scandal and stated that it was his opinion that Woulfe should resign in order to avoid continuing serious damage to the judiciary. The Government responded on 10 November by acknowledging the serious constitutional issues that have arisen as a result of this.

The scandal was compared to the earlier Dominic Cummings scandal that occurred in the United Kingdom.

== Criminal prosecution ==
In February 2021, it was announced by the Director of Public Prosecutions that four people would be criminally prosecuted for their role in organising the event. Amongst the four were Noel Grealish and Donie Cassidy. In May, Grealish was issued a summons for a court date of 22 July. The case was adjourned until 28 October. It was revealed on 28 October that the trial would get under way in early January 2022 and could take five days to be heard as there are over 50 witnesses. The four men (Grealish, Cassidy, along with James and John Sweeney, of the Station House Hotel in Clifden) went on trial on 6 January 2022, charged with breaching the COVID-19 regulations. District Court Judge Mary Fahy dismissed all the charges on 3 February. The Court concluded: "They were all responsible people who would not have gone to a dinner unless they felt comfortable and unless the organisers had not put in place all that was required to make it safe." Grealish said he was "delighted with the outcome". Donie Cassidy, described as being emotional when leaving the court, said he was always a lawmaker and never a law-breaker.

== See also ==
- Katherine Zappone controversy
- Dominic Cummings scandal
- Partygate
- Witman Hung partygate
