= Ann Louise Gilligan =

Irish theologian

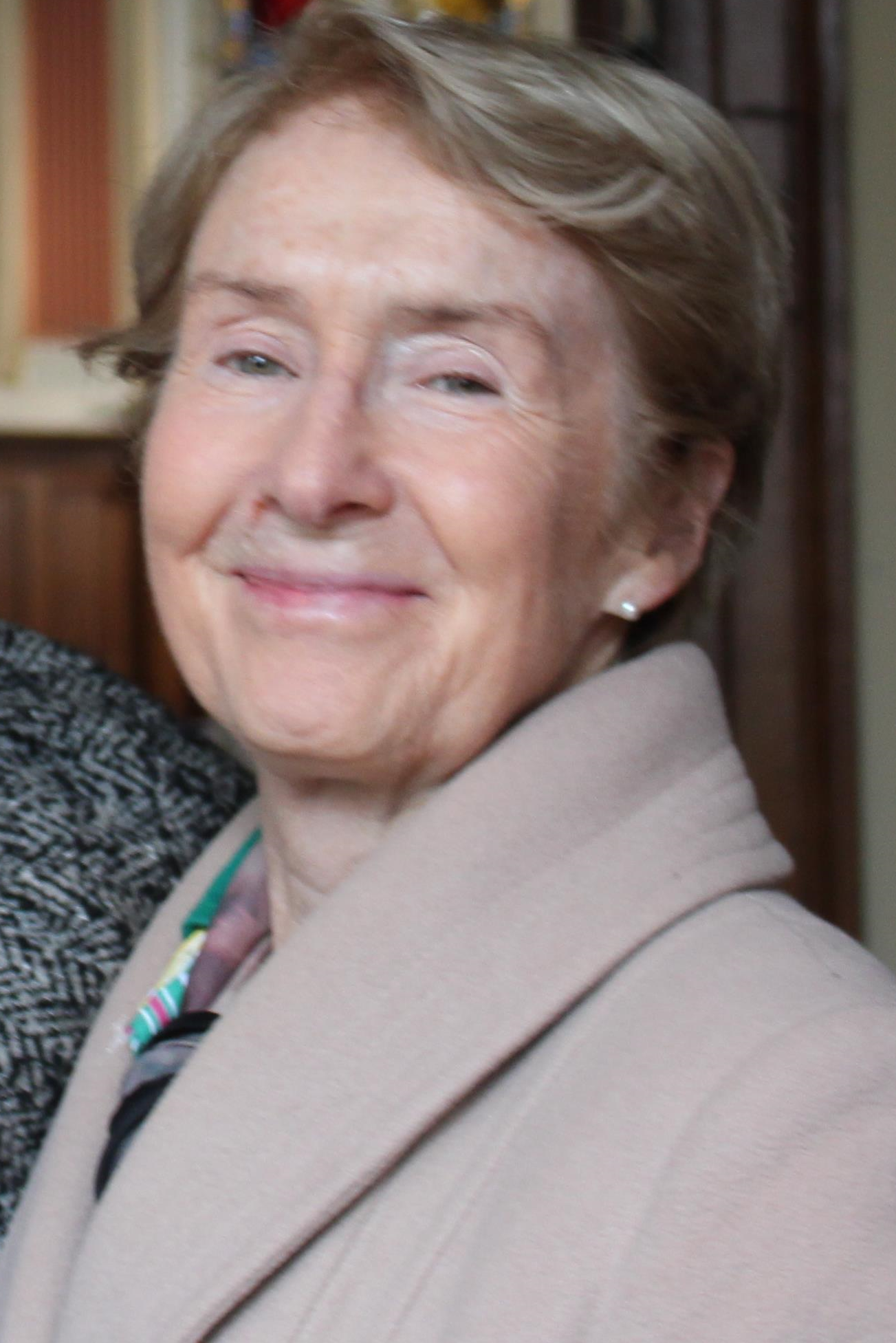
- Ann Louise Gilligan on 16 November 2014
- Born: Ann Louise Gilligan; 27 July 1945; Dublin, Ireland
- Died: 15 June 2017 (aged 71); Dublin, Ireland
- Education: Boston College
- Occupations: Theologian; Lecturer
- Spouse: Katherine Zappone (m. 2003)

Ann Louise Gilligan (27 July 1945 – 15 June 2017) was an Irish theologian who taught at Saint Patrick's College, Drumcondra (part of Dublin City University). A former nun, she was the wife of Katherine Zappone. In Zappone and Gilligan v. Revenue Commissioners (2006), they unsuccessfully sought recognition of their Canadian marriage. Despite failing in the courts, Gilligan was a leading campaigner in Ireland's 2015 same-sex marriage referendum, and ultimately succeeded in having her marriage recognised in Irish law before her death in 2017.

== Personal life ==
Gilligan was born in Dublin to a prosperous family in Nutley Park, Dublin. She had one sister and brother. She was educated in the Loreto secondary school in Foxrock. Gilligan went on to join the Loreto convent and become a nun. She credits this with instilling in her the discipline to fulfil an academic career. After leaving the convent, she worked in Spain and studied in Paris before being hired by St Patrick's College to teach theology in 1976.

In 1981, while studying for her doctorate in theology at Boston College, she met and fell in love with fellow student Katherine Zappone. In September 2003, they married in Canada. Together they fought Zappone and Gilligan v. Revenue Commissioners, a case which made global headlines and set off a decade of debate on marriage equality in Ireland.

== Career ==
Together they also founded An Cosán, Ireland's largest community education organisation. An Cosán now houses three operations; The Shanty Education and Training Centre, an adult community education centre, Rainbow House, an early childhood education and care facility, and Fledglings, a social enterprise centre. According to The Irish Times, An Cosán "was established by Gilligan and Zappone with the intention of bringing valuable community-based education to the Dublin suburb. Two years ago, An Cosán attempted to track the progress of 1,500 past students and found 1,200 were employed."

A former director of the Educational Disadvantage Centre at St. Patrick's College, Gilligan was formerly a member of the Statutory Committee on Educational Disadvantage. In 2001, Micheál Martin, Minister for Health, asked her to form and chair the National Educational Welfare Board. She later sat on the NEWB's Education Committee.

Her academic work primarily focused on subjects like education and gender. She enjoyed cooking, theatre and reading. She had a BMW motorbike, which she used to carry out the couple's weekly grocery shop each Saturday in Blessington. She was in The Samaritans and the Society of Saint Vincent de Paul. She appeared with her spouse on an episode of Room to Improve in 2013.

In 2008, with Zappone, she co-authored their life story Our Lives Out Loud: In Pursuit of Justice and Equality, which was published by O'Brien Press.

== Death ==
Gilligan died on 14 June 2017 after suffering complications from a brain haemorrhage. In 2018 Dublin City University named a lecture theatre after Gilligan.
