= William P. Hogarty =

American Civil War Medal of Honor recipient

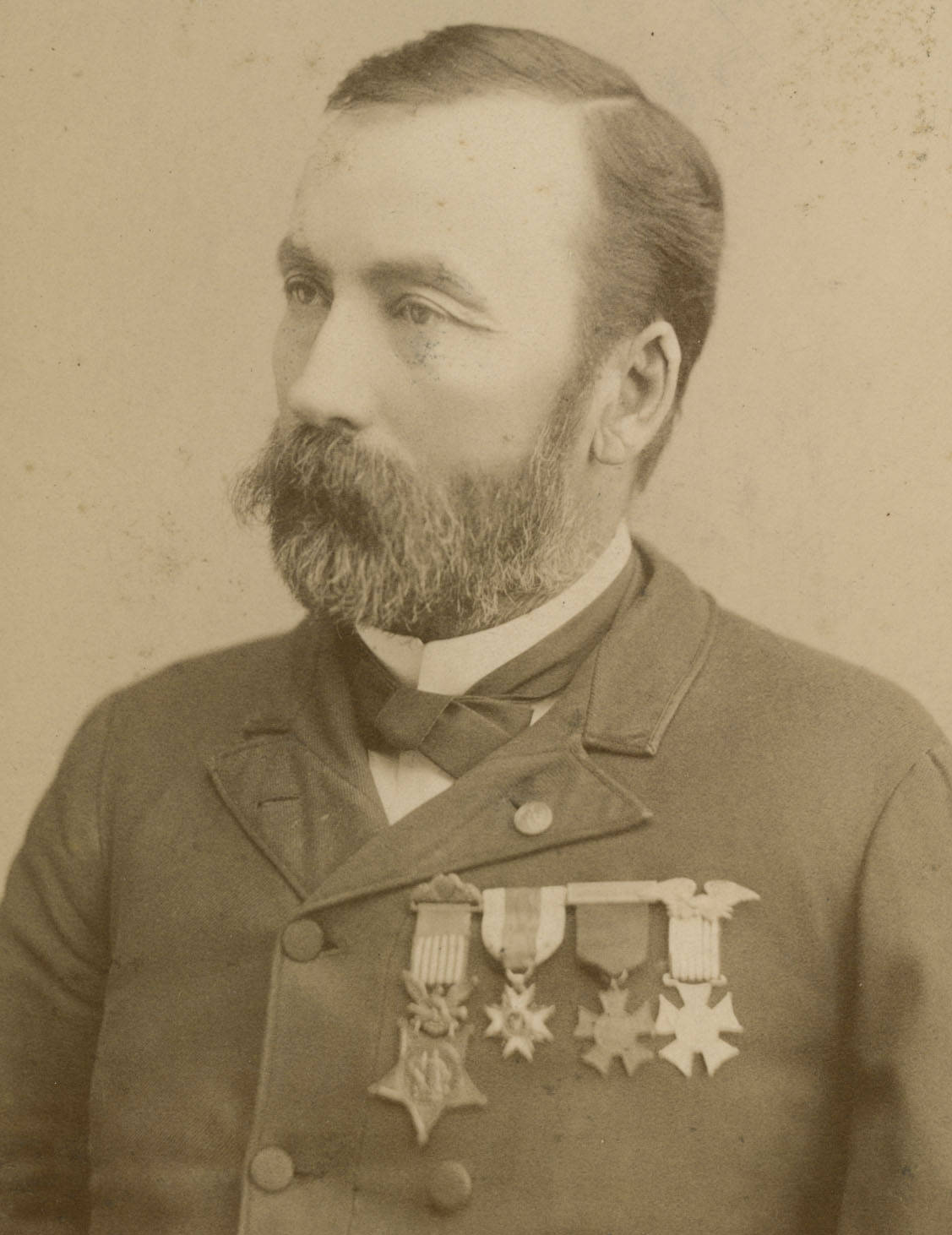
- Hogarty in 1892
- Born: February 16, 1840; New York, New York
- Died: October 23, 1914 (aged 74); Stillwater, Oklahoma
- Burial place: Quindaro Cemetery, Kansas City, Kansas
- Military career
- Allegiance: United States
- Branch: United States Army
- Service years: 1861 - 1863, 1865 - 1870
- Rank: Second lieutenant Brevet Captain
- Units: (New York (state)) Company D, 23rd New York Infantry Regiment (United States) Battery B, 4th U.S. Artillery
- Conflicts: Battle of Antietam; Battle of Fredericksburg; American Civil War
- Awards: Medal of Honor

William Patrick Hogarty (February 16, 1840 - October 23, 1914) was an American soldier who fought in the American Civil War. Hogarty received the United States' highest award for bravery during combat, the Medal of Honor. Hogarty's medal was won for his actions during two battles, in the Battle of Antietam, Maryland, on September 17, 1862, and the Battle of Fredericksburg, Virginia, on December 13, 1862. He was honored with the award on June 22, 1891.

Hogarty was born in New York City and joined the 23rd New York Infantry from Elmira, New York, in May 1861. He was discharged in January 1863, but was commissioned as a second lieutenant with the Veteran Reserve Corps two years later. Despite his disability, he continued serving in the Army until retiring in December 1870.

== Medal of Honor citation ==
The President of the United States of America, in the name of Congress, takes pleasure in presenting the Medal of Honor to Private William P. Hogarty, United States Army, for distinguished gallantry in actions September 17 to 13 December 1862, while attached to Battery B, 4th U.S. Artillery. Private Hogarty lost his left arm at Fredericksburg.

== See also ==
- List of American Civil War Medal of Honor recipients: G–L
