= The Echo (Dublin) =

Regional newspaper

- The Echo logo
- Founded: 1980
- City: Dublin
- Country: Ireland
- Website: echo.ie

The Echo (previously The Tallaght Echo) is a regional newspaper covering parts of Dublin in Ireland. It was founded by owner David Kennedy in 1980, who launched the newspaper out of the front room of his house, and originally called it The Tallaght Echo. The paper has since grown to cover the adjacent suburbs of Clondalkin, Ballyfermot and Lucan.

The Echo was sold in June 2005 to the Leinster Leader, in a deal reported to be about €5 million. Three months later, in September 2005, the Leinster Leader was sold to Johnston Press, which is owned by a holding company by the name of Tallaght Publishing Ltd.

The paper was reacquired by David Kennedy for an estimated €1 million in 2009 and Johnston Press transferred ownership back on 5 January 2010.
