= Philip Hogarty =

Irish chess player

Philip David Hogarty (18 April 1988 – 1 January 2008) was chairman of the Irish Chess Union from September 2006 until his death in January 2008.

== Career ==
Hogarty began playing chess in 6th class in primary school at the age of 12.

In 2004, he won the Leinster Schools Under 16 Championship.

In 2005, he represented Leinster at the Inter-Provincials, playing as board 5 on the U19 team. In December that year, he finished unbeaten with 4.5 points out of 6 games in the Leinster Championships Challengers section. He finished in joint 2nd place.

In 2006, he played on the top board for DIT in the Irish Intervarsities helping them to achieve a third-place finish. After moving to the Rathmines Chess Club, he played on the top board in the Heidenfeld Memorial amassing 9 points out of 11 to finish as the competition's top scorer for the 2006/2007 season. He also came joint 2nd in the biggest tournament in Ireland, the Bunratty Chess Festival Major section. He finished unbeaten yet again, with 5/6. To round out 2006, he placed 4th in the season long ranking "Grand Prix" competition. This meant that Hogarty had the 4th best tournament results of the year in his section.

In 2007, in an achievement which was set to propel him to the upper echelons of Irish Chess, Philip was selected to play for Rathmines’ strongest team in Ireland's premier event the Armstrong Cup for the 2007/2008 season. At the halfway stage of this competition Philip had scored a very credible 4 points out of 6 against mainly expert opponents.

At the time of his death Philip had reached number 32 in the Irish Chess Union rating list.

His election in 2006 as chairman of the Irish Chess Union made him, at 18 years of age, the youngest person ever to be elected to this position.

== Results ==
Year	Tournament	Place	Score	Notes
2007	Leinster Championships	10th/13	2.5/6	This was Hogarty's last tournament before his death
2007	Irish Championships	35th/52	4/9	
2007	British Major Open	23rd/76	6/11	
2007	Cork Masters	25th/61	3/6	
2007	Galway Masters	15th/61	3.5/6	
2007	Kilkenny Masters	29th/32	2/6	
2007	Bunratty Challengers	28th/62	3/6	
2007	Limerick Open	14th/62	4/6	
2006	Irish Championships Weekender	12th/14	2/6	
2006	Bunratty Major	2nd/67	5/6	Hogarty won a prize for 2nd in this tournament
2006	Galway Masters	36th/64	3/6	
2006	Limerick Open	9th/75	4/6	
2006	Grand Prix - Sect. 3	4th	n/a	The Grand Prix was a season long competition, taking into account performance in all tournaments*
2005	Leinster Challengers	3rd/23	4.5/6	Hogarty won a prize for 2nd in this tournament
2005	Bunratty Major	63rd/85	2.5/6	
2004	Leinster Schools U 16 Championship	1st	(unknown)	Hogarty became U16 Schools Champion in Leinster

*This took into account the Leinster Challengers tournament from 2005, as this event took place in late December 2005

== Personal life and death ==
Hogarty was born in Holles Street Hospital, Dublin, and raised in Baggot Street until in 1990, at the age of two, he moved to the suburb of Jobstown in Tallaght.

While crossing the Blessington Road in Tallaght at about 2:30 am on 1 January 2008, he was hit by the driver of a Garda car, and died shortly later. His funeral Mass was held in St. Thomas's church in Jobstown.
