= William Barker (chemist) =

Irish chemist (1810–1873)

Prof. Prof. William Barker, second RCSI Prof. of Chemistry RCSI and held the position for over twenty years. 1850-1873

William Barker (1810–1873) was the second professor of chemistry at the Royal College of Surgeons in Ireland from 1850 to 1873.

Barker was born in Dublin in 1810 as the son of Francis Barker M.D., professor of chemistry at Trinity College Dublin. He was educated in Arts and Medicine in Trinity College Dublin, and in 1832 took the degree of B.A. in 1835 that of M.B. and in 1842 proceeded to the M.D. degree. He was a fellow of the College of Physicians, of which, in 1854, he became vice-president but he never practised as a physician. In 1836, he began to lecture on Chemistry in the Richmond School Dublin and in 1850 succeeded Prof. James Apjohn as the Chair of Chemistry in the RCSI. While this would be unusual today, in the latter part of the 19th century and early part of the 20th century the cultivation of chemical sciences and the practice of medicine were frequently associated with the same person. Barker died in Dublin 11 September 1873 at the age of 63.
