= Jobstown =

Suburban area within greater Tallaght in Dublin, Ireland

Jobstown Ráth Miontáin (Irish)
- Suburban area
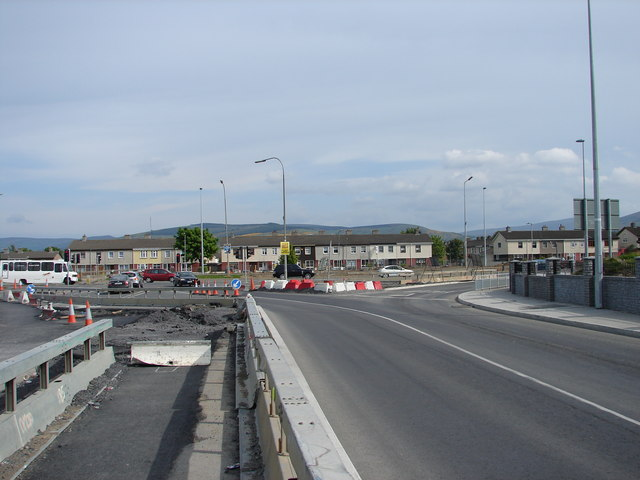
- Roundabout near Jobstown

- Location in Dublin Jobstown (Ireland)
- Coordinates: 53°16′46″N 6°24′15″W
- Country: Ireland
- Province: Leinster
- County: County Dublin
- Local government area: South Dublin
- Time zone: UTC±0 (WET)
  - Summer (DST): UTC+1 (IST)
- Eircode routing key: D24
- Telephone area code: +353(0)1

Jobstown (/ˈdʒoʊbz.taʊn/; Irish: Ráth Miontáin), also historically called Rathminton, is a townland and suburban area of Tallaght in Dublin, Ireland, and so an outer suburb of Dublin. It is in the local government area of South Dublin.

== History ==
Jobstown takes its name from Henry Jope, who held land here in the 1250s.

Jobstown was historically a small rural farming community three kilometres from Tallaght village, close to the western foothills of the Dublin Mountains. The only landmark in the area was the public house called the Jobstown House. The censuses of 1901 and 1911 showed that the population was low, and consisted mostly of farmers.

Tallaght Rehabilitation Project, a drug and alcohol rehabilitation service, have been based at nearby Kiltalown House since 2005, offering programmes to assist people in the Tallaght area who have become drug or alcohol free, or who are stable in treatment on prescribed methadone.

Today, it is a densely populated suburb. According to the 2011 census, carried out by the central statistics office, Jobstown had a population of 16,616.

== Location and access ==
Jobstown is a townland, surrounded by others townlands including Brookfield, Corbally, Sundale, Johnville, Killinarden, Kiltalown, Mount Seskin, and Whitestown.

It is situated 14 kilometres (8.7 miles) west of Dublin city centre, and can be reached from the city by Dublin Bus route 27. It is a 15-minute walk from Jobstown to the Luas tram service from Tallaght Hospital or The Square Shopping Centre into Dublin.

== Social issues ==
Due to social problems attendant on the birth of a new community, the government has initiated a number of community-based projects to counteract a bad youth culture which developed when the large local authority housing stock was built without a supporting social structure. These initiatives are beginning to bear fruit, aided by the enthusiasm of the community. The first school to open in Jobstown was St. Thomas National School in April 1982. It is a DEIS Band 1 school and was successful in having radical government cuts reversed in spring 2012, as part of the Save Our Schools campaign.

In January 2023, Dublin Bus announced that due to anti-social behaviour such as vandalism and treatment of drivers on their services and buses in the Jobstown and West Tallaght area, routes 27, 65B and 77A would terminate at The Square in Tallaght from 6 p.m. In April 2023, the service was restored following negotiations between Dublin Bus and unions and consultations with representatives of local residents, political representatives and An Garda Síochána.

== People ==
The war correspondent, William Howard Russell (1821–1907) was born at Lilyvale in Jobstown (now site of the Whitestown Industrial Estate). He was a journalist with The Times and reported on Daniel O'Connell's repeal campaign and on the great famine of 1847. On the outbreak of the Crimean War, he became the first war correspondent and was later knighted for his work.

Several League of Ireland football players are from the area, including the former Irish international and English Premiership soccer players, Richard Dunne and Robbie Keane. Current Shamrock Rovers manager Stephen Bradley also hails from Jobstown. The former chairman of the Irish Chess Union, Philip Hogarty, was also from Tallaght. Former MMA and UFC fighter Paddy Holohan lives in Jobstown as of 2021.
