= List of female members of Seanad Éireann =

This is a list of women senators who have been elected or appointed to Seanad Éireann, the upper house of the Oireachtas, the bicameral parliament of Ireland.

== Women in Seanad Éireann ==
Denotes incumbent member of Seanad Éireann

Name	Year first elected	Panel/Constituency first elected	Party as first elected	Age when first elected	Years in Seanad
Eileen Costello	1922	Elected by Dáil Éireann	Independent	52	1922–1934
Ellen Cuffe, Countess of Desart	1922	Nominated by the President	Independent	65	1922–1933
Alice Stopford Green	1922	Elected by Dáil Éireann	Independent	75	1922–1929
Jennie Wyse Power	1922	Nominated by the President	Independent	64	1922–1936
Kathleen Browne	1929	Elected at a by-election	Cumann na nGaedheal	50	1929–1936
Helena Concannon	1938	National University	Fianna Fáil	60	1938–1952
Margaret L. Kennedy	1938	Nominated by the Taoiseach	Fianna Fáil	46	1938–1948
Linda Kearns MacWhinney	1938	Industrial and Commercial Panel	Fianna Fáil	49	1938
Margaret Mary Pearse	1938	Administrative Panel	Fianna Fáil	60	1938–1968
Eleanor Howard	1948	Nominated by the Taoiseach	Labour	33	1948–1951
Mary Davidson	1950	Industrial and Commercial Panel	Labour	46	1950–1951; 1954–1969
Jane Dowdall	1951	Industrial and Commercial Panel	Fianna Fáil	51	1951–1961
Nora Connolly O'Brien	1957	Nominated by the Taoiseach	Fianna Fáil	64	1957–1969
Kit Ahern	1964	Nominated by the Taoiseach	Fianna Fáil	42	1964–1977
Eileen Desmond	1969	Industrial and Commercial Panel	Labour	36	1969–1973
Evelyn Owens	1969	Labour Panel	Labour	38	1969–1977
Mary Robinson (Bourke to 1970)	1969	Dublin University	Independent	25	1969–1989
Peggy Farrell	1969	Nominated by the Taoiseach	Fianna Fáil	48	1969–1973
Mary Walsh	1973	Cultural and Educational Panel	Fine Gael	43	1973–1976
Eileen Cassidy	1977	Nominated by the Taoiseach	Fianna Fáil	45	1977–1981
Valerie Goulding	1977	Nominated by the Taoiseach	Fianna Fáil	59	1977–1981
Mary Harney	1977	Nominated by the Taoiseach	Fianna Fáil	24	1977–1981
Tras Honan	1977	Administrative Panel	Fianna Fáil	47	1977–1993
Gemma Hussey	1977	National University	Independent	38	1977–1982
Catherine McGuinness	1979	National University	Independent	45	1979–1982; 1983–1987
Deirdre Bolger	1981	Industrial and Commercial Panel	Fine Gael	43	1981–1982
Katharine Bulbulia	1981	Administrative Panel	Fine Gael	38	1981–1989
Miriam Kearney	1981	Nominated by the Taoiseach	Fine Gael	22	1981–1982
Patsy Lawlor	1981	Cultural and Educational Panel	Fine Gael	48	1981–1982
Mary O'Rourke	1981	Cultural and Educational Panel	Fianna Fáil	44	1981–1983; 2002–2007
Camilla Hannon	1982	Nominated by the Taoiseach	Fianna Fáil	45	1982
Monica Barnes	1982	Labour Panel	Fine Gael	46	1982
Madeleine Taylor-Quinn	1982	Cultural and Educational Panel	Fine Gael	30	1982; 1993–2002
Helena McAuliffe-Ennis	1983	Cultural and Educational Panel	Labour	32	1983–1987
Nuala Fennell	1983	Nominated by the Taoiseach	Fine Gael	47	1983–1989
Bríd Rodgers	1983	Nominated by the Taoiseach	Independent	48	1983–1987
Mary Wallace	1987	Administrative Panel	Fianna Fáil	29	1987–1989
Olga Bennett	1989	Nominated by the Taoiseach	Fianna Fáil	42	1989–1993
Avril Doyle	1989	Agricultural Panel	Fine Gael	40	1989–1992; 1997–2002
Carmencita Hederman	1989	Dublin University	Independent	49	1989–1993
Mary Jackman	1989	Labour Panel	Fine Gael	46	1989–1993; 1997–2002
Helen Keogh	1989	Nominated by the Taoiseach	Progressive Democrats	38	1989–1993; 1997–2002
Ann Gallagher	1993	Industrial and Commercial Panel	Labour	25	1993–1997
Mary Henry	1993	Dublin University	Independent	52	1993–2007
Cathy Honan	1993	Industrial and Commercial Panel	Progressive Democrats	41	1993–1997
Mary Kelly	1993	Cultural and Educational Panel	Labour	40	1993–1997
Marian McGennis	1993	Nominated by the Taoiseach	Fianna Fáil	39	1993–1997
Jan O'Sullivan	1993	Administrative Panel	Labour	42	1993–1997
Ann Ormonde	1993	Cultural and Educational Panel	Fianna Fáil	58	1993–2011
Niamh Bhreathnach	1997	Nominated by the Taoiseach	Labour	53	1997
Niamh Cosgrave	1997	Nominated by the Taoiseach	Fine Gael	32	1997
Margaret Cox	1997	Industrial and Commercial Panel	Fianna Fáil	33	1997–2007
Ann Leonard	1997	Nominated by the Taoiseach	Fianna Fáil	28	1997–2002
Kathleen O'Meara	1997	Agricultural Panel	Labour	37	1997–2007
Máirín Quill	1997	Nominated by the Taoiseach	Progressive Democrats	61	1997–2002
Therese Ridge	1997	Labour Panel	Fine Gael	56	1997–2002
Joanna Tuffy	2002	Administrative Panel	Labour	37	2002–2007
Sheila Terry	2002	Industrial and Commercial Panel	Fine Gael	52	2002–2007
Mary White	2002	Industrial and Commercial Panel	Fianna Fáil	57	2002–2016
Geraldine Feeney	2002	Labour Panel	Fianna Fáil	45	2002–2011
Kate Walsh	2002	Nominated by the Taoiseach	Progressive Democrats	55	2002–2007
Ivana Bacik	2007	Dublin University	Independent (Labour Party from 2009)	39	2007–2021
Maria Corrigan	2007	Nominated by the Taoiseach	Fianna Fáil		2007–2011
Déirdre de Búrca	2007	Nominated by the Taoiseach	Green	43	2007–2010
Frances Fitzgerald	2007	Labour Panel	Fine Gael	56	2007–2011
Fidelma Healy Eames	2007	Labour Panel	Fine Gael	45	2007–2016
Cecilia Keaveney	2007	Cultural and Educational Panel	Fianna Fáil	38	2007–2011
Lisa McDonald	2007	Nominated by the Taoiseach	Fianna Fáil	33	2007–2011
Nicky McFadden	2007	Administrative Panel	Fine Gael	44	2007–2011
Fiona O'Malley	2007	Nominated by the Taoiseach	Progressive Democrats	39	2007–2011
Phil Prendergast	2007	Labour Panel	Labour	47	2007–2011
Deirdre Clune	2011	Cultural and Educational Panel	Fine Gael	51	2011–2014
Aideen Hayden	2011	Nominated by the Taoiseach	Labour	52	2011–2016
Imelda Henry	2011	Industrial and Commercial Panel	Fine Gael	44	2011–2016
Lorraine Higgins	2011	Nominated by the Taoiseach	Labour	31	2011–2016
Cáit Keane	2011	Labour Panel	Fine Gael	61	2011–2016
Marie Moloney	2011	Labour Panel	Labour	52	2011–2016
Mary Moran	2011	Nominated by the Taoiseach	Labour	50	2011–2016
Catherine Noone	2011	Industrial and Commercial Panel	Fine Gael	34	2011–2020
Mary Ann O'Brien	2011	Nominated by the Taoiseach	Independent	50	2011–2016
Marie-Louise O'Donnell	2011	Nominated by the Taoiseach	Independent	58	2011–2020
Susan O'Keeffe	2011	Agricultural Panel	Labour	50	2011–2016
Averil Power	2011	Industrial and Commercial Panel	Fianna Fáil	32	2011–2016
Kathryn Reilly	2011	Industrial and Commercial Panel	Sinn Féin	22	2011–2016
Jillian van Turnhout	2011	Nominated by the Taoiseach	Independent	43	2011–2016
Katherine Zappone	2011	Nominated by the Taoiseach	Independent	57	2011–2016
Hildegarde Naughton	2013	Nominated by the Taoiseach	Fine Gael	36	2013–2016
Máiría Cahill	2015	Industrial and Commercial Panel	Labour	34	2015–2016
Catherine Ardagh	2016	Industrial and Commercial Panel	Fianna Fáil	34	2016–2024
Frances Black	2016	Industrial and Commercial Panel	Independent	55	2016–
Maria Byrne	2016	Agricultural Panel	Fine Gael	48	2016–2020; 2021–
Lorraine Clifford-Lee	2016	Cultural and Educational Panel	Fianna Fáil	34	2016–
Rose Conway-Walsh	2016	Agricultural Panel	Sinn Féin	45	2016–2020
Máire Devine	2016	Labour Panel	Sinn Féin	43	2016–2020
Joan Freeman	2016	Nominated by the Taoiseach	Independent	58	2016–2020
Alice-Mary Higgins	2016	National University	Independent	40	2016–
Maura Hopkins	2016	Administrative Panel	Fine Gael	31	2016–2020
Colette Kelleher	2016	Nominated by the Taoiseach	Independent	55	2016–2020
Gabrielle McFadden	2016	Cultural and Educational Panel	Fine Gael	49	2016–2020
Michelle Mulherin	2016	Nominated by the Taoiseach	Fine Gael	44	2016–2020
Jennifer Murnane O'Connor	2016	Labour Panel	Fianna Fáil	49	2016–2020
Grace O'Sullivan	2016	Agricultural Panel	Green	54	2016–2019
Lynn Ruane	2016	Dublin University	Independent	31	2016–
Pippa Hackett	2019	Agricultural Panel	Green	45	2019–2025
Lynn Boylan	2020	Agricultural Panel	Sinn Féin	33	2020–2024
Lisa Chambers	2020	Cultural and Educational Panel	Fianna Fáil	33	2020–2025
Annie Hoey	2020	Agricultural Panel	Labour	31	2020–2025
Sharon Keogan	2020	Industrial and Commercial Panel	Independent	53	2020–
Elisha McCallion	2020	Industrial and Commercial Panel	Sinn Féin	37	2020
Rebecca Moynihan	2020	Administrative Panel	Labour	38	2020–2025
Fiona O'Loughlin	2020	Administrative Panel	Fianna Fáil	54	2020–
Pauline O'Reilly	2020	Labour Panel	Green	46	2020–2025
Marie Sherlock	2020	Labour Panel	Labour		2020–2024
Emer Currie	2020	Nominated by the Taoiseach	Fine Gael	42	2020–2024
Regina Doherty	2020	Nominated by the Taoiseach	Fine Gael	49	2020–2024
Aisling Dolan	2020	Nominated by the Taoiseach	Fine Gael	45	2020–2025
Mary Fitzpatrick	2020	Nominated by the Taoiseach	Fianna Fáil	51	2020–
Eileen Flynn	2020	Nominated by the Taoiseach	Independent	30	2020–
Róisín Garvey	2020	Nominated by the Taoiseach	Green	46	2020–2025
Mary Seery Kearney	2020	Nominated by the Taoiseach	Fine Gael		2020–2025
Erin McGreehan	2020	Nominated by the Taoiseach	Fianna Fáil	37	2020–2024
Nikki Bradley	2024	Nominated by the Taoiseach	Fine Gael	38	2024–
Anne Rabbitte	2024	Nominated by the Taoiseach	Fianna Fáil	51	2024–
Nicole Ryan	2020	Administrative Panel	Sinn Féin	31	2025–
Joanne Collins	2025	Agricultural Panel	Sinn Féin		2025–
Teresa Costello	2025	Agricultural Panel	Fianna Fáil	47	2025–
Eileen Lynch	2025	Agricultural Panel	Fine Gael		2025–
Sarah O'Reilly	2025	Agricultural Panel	Aontú	49	2025–
Pauline Tully	2025	Cultural and Educational Panel	Sinn Féin	53	2025–
Laura Harmon	2025	Industrial and Commercial Panel	Labour	38	2025–
Linda Nelson Murray	2025	Industrial and Commercial Panel	Fine Gael		2025–
Nessa Cosgrove	2025	Labour Panel	Labour		2025–
Maria McCormack	2025	Labour Panel	Sinn Féin		2025–
Margaret Murphy O'Mahony	2025	Labour Panel	Fianna Fáil	55	2025–
Patricia Stephenson	2025	Labour Panel	Social Democrats		2025–
Alison Comyn	2025	Nominated by the Taoiseach	Fianna Fáil	55	2025–
Imelda Goldsboro	2025	Nominated by the Taoiseach	Fianna Fáil		2025–
Evanne Ní Chuilinn	2025	Nominated by the Taoiseach	Fine Gael	43	2025–
Dee Ryan	2025	Nominated by the Taoiseach	Fianna Fáil		2025–

== Number of women in each Seanad ==
Seanad	Election	Number (%)	By-elections
1st	1922	4 / 60 (6%)	1
2nd	1937	4 / 60 (6%)	0
3rd	1938	3 / 60 (5%)	0
4th	1943	3 / 60 (5%)	0
5th	1944	3 / 60 (5%)	0
6th	1948	3 / 60 (5%)	1
7th	1951	3 / 60 (5%)	0
8th	1954	3 / 60 (5%)	0
9th	1957	4 / 60 (6%)	0
10th	1961	3 / 60 (5%)	1
11th	1965	4 / 60 (6%)	0
12th	1969	5 / 60 (8%)	0
13th	1973	4 / 60 (6%)	0
14th	1977	6 / 60 (10%)	1
15th	1981	9 / 60 (15%)	0
16th	1982 (Feb)	8 / 60 (13%)	0
17th	1982 (Nov)	6 / 60 (10%)	1
18th	1987	5 / 60 (8%)	0
19th	1989	6 / 60 (10%)	0
20th	1992	8 / 60 (13%)	2
21st	1997	11 / 60 (18%)	1
22nd	2002	10 / 60 (16%)	0
23rd	2007	13 / 60 (21%)	0
24th	2011	18 / 60 (30%)	2
25th	2016	18 / 60 (30%)	1
26th	2020	24 / 60 (40%)	1
27th	2025	27 / 60 (45%)	0

== See also ==
- Families in the Oireachtas
- List of female members of Dáil Éireann
- Records of members of the Oireachtas

== Sources ==
- McNamara, Maedhbh; Mooney, Paschal (2000). Women in Parliament: Ireland 1918–2000. Dublin: Wolfhound Press. ISBN 0-86327-759-4.
- "Members Database – Seanad". Houses of the Oireachtas.
- "ElectionsIreland.org".
