= 15th Seanad =

Members of the Seanad from 1981 to 1982

←	14th Seanad	16th Seanad	→

Overview
- Legislative body: Seanad Éireann
- Jurisdiction: Ireland
- Meeting place: Leinster House
- Term: 8 October 1981 – 16 April 1982
- Government: 17th government of Ireland
- Members: 60
- Cathaoirleach: Charles McDonald (FG)
- Leas-Chathaoirleach: Séamus Dolan (FF)
- Leader of the Seanad: Gemma Hussey (FG)

The 15th Seanad was in office from 1981 to 1982. An election to Seanad Éireann, the senate of the Oireachtas (Irish parliament), followed the 1981 general election to the 22nd Dáil. The senators served until the close of poll for the 16th Seanad.

== Cathaoirleach ==
On 8 October 1981, Charles McDonald (FG) was proposed as Cathaoirleach by Gemma Hussey (FG) and seconded by Michael Ferris (Lab). He was elected without a division.

On 9 October 1981, Séamus Dolan (FF) was proposed as Leas-Chathaoirleach by Eoin Ryan (FF) and seconded by William Ryan (FF). He was elected without a division.

== Composition of the 15th Seanad ==
There are a total of 60 seats in the Seanad: 43 were elected on five vocational panels, 6 were elected from two university constituencies and 11 were nominated by the Taoiseach.

The following table shows the composition by party when the 15th Seanad first met on 8 October 1981.

Origin Party	Vocational panels					NUI	DU	Nominated	Total
Origin Party	Admin	Agri	Cult & Educ	Ind & Comm	Labour	NUI	DU	Nominated	Total
Fianna Fáil	3	5	2	4	5	0	0	0	19
Fine Gael	3	5	2	4	5	1	0	6	26
Labour Party	1	1	1	1	1	0	1	4	10
Independent	0	0	0	0	0	2	2	1	5
Total	7	11	5	9	11	3	3	11	60

== List of senators ==
- Note: The entries for Senators who were elected or appointed to fill vacancies are shown in italics

Name	Panel	Party	Notes
Katharine Bulbulia	Administrative Panel	Fine Gael	
Micheál Cranitch	Administrative Panel	Fianna Fáil	
Tras Honan	Administrative Panel	Fianna Fáil	
Patrick Kennedy	Administrative Panel	Fine Gael	
Jimmy Leonard	Administrative Panel	Fianna Fáil	Elected to 23rd Dáil at general election on 18 February 1982
Flor O'Mahony	Administrative Panel	Labour	
Myles Staunton	Administrative Panel	Fine Gael	
Richard Bruton	Agricultural Panel	Fine Gael	Elected to 23rd Dáil at general election on 18 February 1982
Pierce Butler	Agricultural Panel	Fine Gael	
Michael Ferris	Agricultural Panel	Labour	
Tom Fitzgerald	Agricultural Panel	Fianna Fáil	
Thomas Hussey	Agricultural Panel	Fianna Fáil	
Rory Kiely	Agricultural Panel	Fianna Fáil	
John Mannion	Agricultural Panel	Fine Gael	
Charles McDonald	Agricultural Panel	Fine Gael	
Liam Naughten	Agricultural Panel	Fine Gael	Elected to 23rd Dáil at general election on 18 February 1982
Martin O'Toole	Agricultural Panel	Fianna Fáil	
William Ryan	Agricultural Panel	Fianna Fáil	
Patsy Lawlor	Cultural and Educational Panel	Fine Gael	
Maurice Manning	Cultural and Educational Panel	Fine Gael	Elected to 23rd Dáil at general election on 18 February 1982
Timothy McAuliffe	Cultural and Educational Panel	Labour	
Mary O'Rourke	Cultural and Educational Panel	Fianna Fáil	
Joe Walsh	Cultural and Educational Panel	Fianna Fáil	Elected to 23rd Dáil at general election on 18 February 1982
Deirdre Bolger	Industrial and Commercial Panel	Fine Gael	
Barry Cogan	Industrial and Commercial Panel	Fianna Fáil	
Seán Fallon	Industrial and Commercial Panel	Fianna Fáil	
Alexis FitzGerald	Industrial and Commercial Panel	Fine Gael	Elected to 23rd Dáil at general election on 18 February 1982
Michael Howard	Industrial and Commercial Panel	Fine Gael	
Mick Lanigan	Industrial and Commercial Panel	Fianna Fáil	
Ruairi Quinn	Industrial and Commercial Panel	Labour	Elected to 23rd Dáil at general election on 18 February 1982
Patrick J. Reynolds	Industrial and Commercial Panel	Fine Gael	
Eoin Ryan	Industrial and Commercial Panel	Fianna Fáil	
John Blennerhassett	Labour Panel	Fine Gael	
Toddie Byrne	Labour Panel	Fine Gael	
Donal Carey	Labour Panel	Fine Gael	Elected to 23rd Dáil at general election on 18 February 1982
Séamus Dolan	Labour Panel	Fianna Fáil	
Des Hanafin	Labour Panel	Fianna Fáil	
Jack Harte	Labour Panel	Labour	
Brian Hillery	Labour Panel	Fianna Fáil	
Dan Kiely	Labour Panel	Fianna Fáil	
Brian Mullooly	Labour Panel	Fianna Fáil	
Andy O'Brien	Labour Panel	Fine Gael	
Maurice O'Connell	Labour Panel	Fine Gael	
Gemma Hussey	National University of Ireland	Fine Gael	Elected to 23rd Dáil at general election on 18 February 1982
John A. Murphy	National University of Ireland	Independent	
Brendan Ryan	National University of Ireland	Independent	
Catherine McGuinness	Dublin University	Independent	
Mary Robinson	Dublin University	Labour	
Shane Ross	Dublin University	Independent	
Ulick Burke	Nominated by the Taoiseach	Fine Gael	
John F. Carroll	Nominated by the Taoiseach	Labour	
Timmy Conway	Nominated by the Taoiseach	Labour	
James Dooge	Nominated by the Taoiseach	Fine Gael	
Patrick Dunne	Nominated by the Taoiseach	Labour	
Robert Fausset	Nominated by the Taoiseach	Fine Gael	
Jim Higgins	Nominated by the Taoiseach	Fine Gael	
Miriam Kearney	Nominated by the Taoiseach	Fine Gael	
Pat Magner	Nominated by the Taoiseach	Labour	
Seán O'Leary	Nominated by the Taoiseach	Fine Gael	
T. K. Whitaker	Nominated by the Taoiseach	Independent	

== Changes ==
Date	Panel	Loss	Gain	Note
18 February 1982	Administrative Panel	Fianna Fáil		Jimmy Leonard elected to 23rd Dáil at general election
18 February 1982	Agricultural Panel	Fine Gael		Richard Bruton elected to 23rd Dáil at general election
18 February 1982	Agricultural Panel	Fine Gael		Liam Naughten elected to 23rd Dáil at general election
18 February 1982	Cultural and Educational Panel	Fine Gael		Maurice Manning elected to 23rd Dáil at general election
18 February 1982	Cultural and Educational Panel	Fianna Fáil		Joe Walsh elected to 23rd Dáil at general election
18 February 1982	Industrial and Commercial Panel	Fine Gael		Alexis FitzGerald elected to 23rd Dáil at general election
18 February 1982	Industrial and Commercial Panel	Labour		Ruairi Quinn elected to 23rd Dáil at general election
18 February 1982	Labour Panel	Fine Gael		Donal Carey elected to 23rd Dáil at general election
18 February 1982	Labour Panel	Fianna Fáil		Séamus Dolan elected to 23rd Dáil at general election
18 February 1982	National University	Fine Gael		Gemma Hussey elected to 23rd Dáil at general election
