= 20th Seanad =

Members of the Seanad from 1993 to 1997

←	19th Seanad	21st Seanad	→

Overview
- Legislative body: Seanad Éireann
- Jurisdiction: Ireland
- Meeting place: Leinster House
- Term: 17 February 1993 – 10 July 1997
- Government: 23rd government of Ireland (1993–1994); 24th government of Ireland (1994–1997)
- Members: 60
- Cathaoirleach: Seán Fallon (FF) (1993–1995); Liam Naughten (FG) (1995–1996); Liam T. Cosgrave (FG) (1996–1997)
- Leas-Chathaoirleach: Liam Naughten (FG) (1993–1995); Brian Mullooly (FF) (1995–1997)
- Leader of the Seanad: G. V. Wright (FF) (1993–1994); Maurice Manning (FG) (1994–1997)

The 20th Seanad was in office from 1993 to 1997. An election to Seanad Éireann, the senate of the Oireachtas (Irish parliament), followed the 1992 general election to the 27th Dáil. The senators served until the close of poll for the 21st Seanad.

== Cathaoirleach ==
On 17 February 1993, Seán Fallon (FF) was proposed as Cathaoirleach by G. V. Wright (FF) and seconded by Jan O'Sullivan (Lab). He was elected without a division, with David Norris (Ind) dissenting.

On 25 February 1993, Liam Naughten (FG) was proposed as Leas-Chathaoirleach by Maurice Manning (FG) and seconded by Madeleine Taylor-Quinn (FG). Mary Henry (Ind) was proposed by David Norris (Ind) and seconded by Cathy Honan (PDs). Naughten was elected by a vote of 19 to 6.

On 4 July 1995, Seán Fallon died. On 12 July 1995, Liam Naughten (FG) was proposed as Cathaoirleach by Maurice Manning (FG) and seconded by Liam T. Cosgrave (FG). He was elected without a division. On 19 July 1995, Brian Mullooly was proposed as Leas-Chathaoirleach by G. V. Wright (FF) and seconded by Tom Fitzgerald (FF). He was elected without a division.

On 16 November 1996, Liam Naughten died. On 27 November 1996, Liam T. Cosgrave (FG) was proposed as Cathaoirleach by Maurice Manning (FG) and seconded by Jan O'Sullivan (Lab). Brian Mullooly (FF) was proposed by G. V. Wright (FF) and seconded by Michael Finneran (FF). Cosgrave was elected by a vote of 31 to 28.

== Composition of the 20th Seanad ==
There are a total of 60 seats in the Seanad: 43 were elected on five vocational panels, 6 were elected from two university constituencies and 11 were nominated by the Taoiseach.

The following table shows the composition by party when the 20th Seanad first met on 17 February 1993.

Origin Party	Vocational panels					NUI	DU	Nominated	Total
Origin Party	Admin	Agri	Cult & Educ	Ind & Comm	Labour	NUI	DU	Nominated	Total
Fianna Fáil	3	5	2	4	5	0	0	6	25
Fine Gael	3	4	2	3	4	0	1	0	17
Labour Party	1	1	1	1	1	0	0	4	9
Progressive Democrats	0	1	0	1	0	0	0	0	2
Democratic Left	0	0	0	0	1	0	0	0	1
Independent	0	0	0	0	0	3	2	1	6
Total	7	11	5	9	11	3	3	11	60

== List of senators ==
- Note: The entries for Senators who were elected or appointed to fill vacancies are shown in italics

Name	Panel	Party	Notes
Louis Belton	Administrative Panel	Fine Gael	Elected to 28th Dáil at general election
Joe Doyle	Administrative Panel	Fine Gael	
Tom Enright	Administrative Panel	Fine Gael	Elected to 28th Dáil at general election
Michael Finneran	Administrative Panel	Fianna Fáil	
Michael O'Kennedy	Administrative Panel	Fianna Fáil	Elected to 28th Dáil at general election
Jan O'Sullivan	Administrative Panel	Labour	
Dick Roche	Administrative Panel	Fianna Fáil	Elected to 28th Dáil at general election
Paddy Burke	Agricultural Panel	Fine Gael	
Michael Calnan	Agricultural Panel	Labour	
Brendan Daly	Agricultural Panel	Fianna Fáil	Elected to 28th Dáil at general election
Michael D'Arcy	Agricultural Panel	Fine Gael	Elected to 28th Dáil at general election
John Dardis	Agricultural Panel	Progressive Democrats	
John V. Farrelly	Agricultural Panel	Fine Gael	Elected to 28th Dáil at general election
Tom Fitzgerald	Agricultural Panel	Fianna Fáil	
Rory Kiely	Agricultural Panel	Fianna Fáil	
Patrick McGowan	Agricultural Panel	Fianna Fáil	
Liam Naughten	Agricultural Panel	Fine Gael	Died on 16 November 1996
Francis O'Brien	Agricultural Panel	Fianna Fáil	
Denis Naughten	Agricultural Panel	Fine Gael	Elected at by-election on 28 January 1997
Mary Kelly	Cultural and Educational Panel	Labour	
Maurice Manning	Cultural and Educational Panel	Fine Gael	
Ann Ormonde	Cultural and Educational Panel	Fianna Fáil	
Paschal Mooney	Cultural and Educational Panel	Fianna Fáil	
Madeleine Taylor-Quinn	Cultural and Educational Panel	Fine Gael	
Eddie Bohan	Industrial and Commercial Panel	Fianna Fáil	
Liam T. Cosgrave	Industrial and Commercial Panel	Fine Gael	
Seán Fallon	Industrial and Commercial Panel	Fianna Fáil	Died on 4 July 1995
Willie Farrell	Industrial and Commercial Panel	Fianna Fáil	
Ann Gallagher	Industrial and Commercial Panel	Labour	
Cathy Honan	Industrial and Commercial Panel	Progressive Democrats	
Michael Howard	Industrial and Commercial Panel	Fine Gael	
Mick Lanigan	Industrial and Commercial Panel	Fianna Fáil	
Gerry Reynolds	Industrial and Commercial Panel	Fine Gael	Elected to 28th Dáil at general election
Sam McAughtry	Industrial and Commercial Panel	Independent	Elected at by-election on 23 February 1996
Donie Cassidy	Labour Panel	Fianna Fáil	
Bill Cotter	Labour Panel	Fine Gael	
Denis Cregan	Labour Panel	Fine Gael	
Frank Fahey	Labour Panel	Fianna Fáil	Elected to 28th Dáil at general election
Dan Kiely	Labour Panel	Fianna Fáil	
Joe Sherlock	Labour Panel	Democratic Left	Elected as part of an election pact with the Progressive Democrats
Don Lydon	Labour Panel	Fianna Fáil	
Seán Maloney	Labour Panel	Labour	
Jarlath McDonagh	Labour Panel	Fine Gael	
Brian Mullooly	Labour Panel	Fianna Fáil	
Dan Neville	Labour Panel	Fine Gael	
J. J. Lee	National University of Ireland	Independent	
Joe O'Toole	National University of Ireland	Independent	
Feargal Quinn	National University of Ireland	Independent	
Mary Henry	Dublin University	Independent	
David Norris	Dublin University	Independent	
Shane Ross	Dublin University	Fine Gael	
Seán Byrne	Nominated by the Taoiseach	Fianna Fáil	
Bill Cashin	Nominated by the Taoiseach	Labour	
Brian Crowley	Nominated by the Taoiseach	Fianna Fáil	Resigned on 31 August 1994, after election to the European Parliament
Brian Hillery	Nominated by the Taoiseach	Fianna Fáil	Resigned on 4 May 1994, after appointment to the board of the EBRD
Billy Kelleher	Nominated by the Taoiseach	Fianna Fáil	Elected to 28th Dáil at general election
Pat Magner	Nominated by the Taoiseach	Labour	
Marian McGennis	Nominated by the Taoiseach	Fianna Fáil	Elected to 28th Dáil at general election
Jim Townsend	Nominated by the Taoiseach	Labour	
Jack Wall	Nominated by the Taoiseach	Labour	Elected to 28th Dáil at general election
Gordon Wilson	Nominated by the Taoiseach	Independent	Died on 27 June 1995
G. V. Wright	Nominated by the Taoiseach	Fianna Fáil	Elected to 28th Dáil at general election
Edward Haughey	Nominated by the Taoiseach	Fianna Fáil	Nominated on 13 December 1994 to fill vacancy
Michael Mulcahy	Nominated by the Taoiseach	Fianna Fáil	Nominated on 13 December 1994 to fill vacancy
Brian Hayes	Nominated by the Taoiseach	Fine Gael	Nominated on 20 December 1995 to fill vacancy; Elected to 28th Dáil at general election
Tom Berkery	Nominated by the Taoiseach	Fine Gael	Nominated on 13 June 1997 to fill vacancy after general election
Niamh Bhreathnach	Nominated by the Taoiseach	Labour	Nominated on 13 June 1997 to fill vacancy after general election
Niamh Cosgrave	Nominated by the Taoiseach	Fine Gael	Nominated on 13 June 1997 to fill vacancy after general election
Michael Enright	Nominated by the Taoiseach	Democratic Left	Nominated on 13 June 1997 to fill vacancy after general election
Aidan O'Connor	Nominated by the Taoiseach	Fine Gael	Nominated on 13 June 1997 to fill vacancy after general election

== Changes ==
Date	Panel	Loss	Gain	Note
4 May 1994	Nominated by the Taoiseach	Fianna Fáil		Brian Hillery resigned after appointment to the board of the EBRD
31 August 1994	Nominated by the Taoiseach	Fianna Fáil		Brian Crowley resigned after election to the European Parliament
13 December 1994	Nominated by the Taoiseach		Fianna Fáil	Edward Haughey nominated to fill vacancy
13 December 1994	Nominated by the Taoiseach		Fianna Fáil	Michael Mulcahy nominated to fill vacancy
27 June 1995	Nominated by the Taoiseach	Independent		Death of Gordon Wilson
4 July 1995	Industrial and Commercial Panel	Fianna Fáil		Death of Seán Fallon
20 December 1995	Nominated by the Taoiseach		Fine Gael	Brian Hayes nominated to fill vacancy
23 February 1996	Industrial and Commercial Panel		Independent	Sam McAughtry elected at by-election following the death of Seán Fallon
16 November 1996	Agricultural Panel	Fine Gael		Death of Liam Naughten
28 January 1997	Agricultural Panel		Fine Gael	Denis Naughten elected at by-election following the death of Liam Naughten
6 June 1997	Administrative Panel	Fine Gael		Louis Belton elected to 28th Dáil at 1997 general election
6 June 1997	Agricultural Panel	Fine Gael		Michael D'Arcy elected to 28th Dáil at 1997 general election
6 June 1997	Agricultural Panel	Fianna Fáil		Brendan Daly elected to 28th Dáil at 1997 general election
6 June 1997	Administrative Panel	Fine Gael		Tom Enright elected to 28th Dáil at 1997 general election
6 June 1997	Labour Panel	Fianna Fáil		Frank Fahey elected to 28th Dáil at 1997 general election
6 June 1997	Agricultural Panel	Fine Gael		John V. Farrelly elected to 28th Dáil at 1997 general election
6 June 1997	Nominated by the Taoiseach	Fine Gael		Brian Hayes elected to 28th Dáil at 1997 general election
6 June 1997	Nominated by the Taoiseach	Fianna Fáil		Billy Kelleher elected to 28th Dáil at 1997 general election
6 June 1997	Nominated by the Taoiseach	Fianna Fáil		Marian McGennis elected to 28th Dáil at 1997 general election
6 June 1997	Administrative Panel	Fianna Fáil		Michael O'Kennedy elected to 28th Dáil at 1997 general election
6 June 1997	Industrial and Commercial Panel	Fine Gael		Gerry Reynolds elected to 28th Dáil at 1997 general election
6 June 1997	Administrative Panel	Fianna Fáil		Dick Roche elected to 28th Dáil at 1997 general election
6 June 1997	Nominated by the Taoiseach	Labour		Jack Wall elected to 28th Dáil at 1997 general election
6 June 1997	Nominated by the Taoiseach	Fianna Fáil		G. V. Wright elected to 28th Dáil at 1997 general election
13 June 1997	Nominated by the Taoiseach		Fine Gael	Tom Berkery nominated to fill vacancy after the 1997 general election
13 June 1997	Nominated by the Taoiseach		Labour	Niamh Bhreathnach nominated to fill vacancy after the 1997 general election
13 June 1997	Nominated by the Taoiseach		Fine Gael	Niamh Cosgrave nominated to fill vacancy after the 1997 general election
13 June 1997	Nominated by the Taoiseach		Democratic Left	Michael Enright nominated to fill vacancy after the 1997 general election
13 June 1997	Nominated by the Taoiseach		Fine Gael	Aidan O'Connor nominated to fill vacancy after the 1997 general election
