= Manus Boyle =

Manus Boyle may refer to:

- Manus Boyle (Gaelic footballer)
- Manus Boyle (politician)
