= Aidan O'Connor =

Aidan O'Connor may refer to:

- Aidan O'Connor (cricketer), Australian cricketer
- Aidan O'Connor (soccer), American soccer player
- Aidan O'Connor (hurler), Irish hurler
- Aidan O'Connor (politician), Irish politician
