= T. K. Whitaker =

Irish economist, civil servant and politician

Governor of the Central Bank of Ireland
- In office 1 May 1969 – 8 September 1976
- Taoiseach: Jack Lynch; Liam Cosgrave
- Preceded by: Maurice Moynihan
- Succeeded by: Charles Henry Murray

Senator
- In office 27 October 1977 – 13 May 1982
- Constituency: Nominated by the Taoiseach

Personal details
- Born: Thomas Kenneth Whitaker; 8 December 1916 Rostrevor, County Down, Ireland
- Died: 9 January 2017 (aged 100) Blackrock, Dublin, Ireland
- Resting place: Shanganagh Cemetery, Shankill, Dublin, Ireland
- Spouses: Nora Fogarty (m. 1941; died 1994); Mary Moore (m. 2005; died 2008)
- Children: 6
- Education: University of London (BA), (MSc)

Thomas Kenneth Whitaker (8 December 1916 – 9 January 2017) was an Irish economist, politician, diplomat and civil servant who served as Secretary (administrative head) of Ireland's Department of Finance from 1956 to 1969, as Governor of the Central Bank of Ireland from 1969 to 1976 and as a Senator from 1977 to 1982, after being nominated by the Taoiseach. He is considered one of the most influential civil servants in the history of the Irish State, with his economic policies greatly influencing the development of modern Ireland.

== Early life and education ==
Whitaker was born in Rostrevor, a small town in the south of County Down, to southern Catholic parents on 8 December 1916, and was reared in Drogheda, County Louth, in modest circumstances. Neither of his parents were from Ulster, the northern province in Ireland. His mother, Jane O'Connor, came from Ballyguirey East, Labasheeda, County Clare. His father, Edward Whitaker, hailed from County Westmeath and was assistant manager of a linen mill. Ken Whitaker received his primary and secondary education at the local CBS in Drogheda. He studied mathematics, Celtic studies and Latin by correspondence course at University of London, and was awarded external degrees in economics: a bachelor's degree in 1941 and a master's degree in 1952.

== Career ==
In 1956, Whitaker was appointed Secretary of the Department of Finance, at the age of thirty-nine. His appointment took place at a time when Ireland's economy was in deep depression. Economic growth was non-existent, inflation apparently insoluble, unemployment rife, living standards low and emigration at a figure not far below the birth rate. Whitaker believed that free trade, with increased competition and the end of protectionism, would become inevitable and that jobs would have to be created by a shift from agriculture to industry and services. He formed a team of officials within the department which produced a detailed study of the economy, culminating in a plan recommending policies for improvement. The plan was accepted by the government and was transformed into a White Paper which became known as the First Programme for Economic Expansion, and quite unusually this was published with his name attached in November 1958. The programme which became known as the "Grey Book" who many argue brought the stimulus of foreign investment into the Irish economy. However other reforms such as the Department of Industry and Commerce's export profits tax relief introduced in 1956, were opposed by Whitaker.

Before devoting himself to poetry, Thomas Kinsella was Whitaker's private secretary. T. K. Whitaker opposed the low tax strategy.

In 1977, Taoiseach Jack Lynch nominated Whitaker as a member of the 14th Seanad. He served as a Senator from 1977 to 1981, where he sat as an independent member.

In 1981, he was nominated to the 15th Seanad by Taoiseach Garret FitzGerald, where he served until 1982. FitzGerald also appointed him to chair a Committee of Inquiry into the Irish penal system, and he chaired a Parole Board or Sentence Review Group for several years.

Whitaker also served as Chancellor of the National University of Ireland from 1976 to 1996. He was also President of the Royal Irish Academy and as such, a member of the Board of Governors and Guardians of the National Gallery of Ireland, from 1985 to 1987. He had had a very strong love for the Irish language throughout his career and the collection of Irish poetry, An Duanaire: Poems of the Dispossessed 1600–1900, edited by Seán Ó Tuama and Thomas Kinsella was dedicated to Whitaker. From 1995 to 1996 he chaired the Constitution Review Group, an independent expert group established by the government, which published its report in July 1996.

== Awards and recognition ==
Whitaker received many national and international honours and tributes for his achievements during his lifetime, most notably the conferral of "Irishman of the 20th Century" in 2001 and Greatest Living Irish Person in 2002. In November 2014, the Institute of Banking conferred an Honorary Fellowship on Whitaker and created an annual T. K. Whitaker Scholarship in his name. In April 2015, he was presented with a lifetime achievement award by University College Dublin's Economics Society for his outstanding contribution to Ireland's economic policy.

In November 2016, to mark his centenary year, Dún Laoghaire–Rathdown County Council acknowledged Whitaker's "outstanding and progressive contribution to Irish public service and to society". The Cathaoirleach of Dún Laoghaire–Rathdown, Cormac Devlin, presented a special award to Whitaker which was accepted by Ken Whitaker on behalf of his father.

The main administrative building in Dundalk Institute of Technology is named the T.K. Whitaker Building.

== Whitaker Square ==
Whitaker Square in the Grand Canal Dock area of Dublin 2 is named in his honour. The offices of the Economic and Social Research Institute (ESRI) are located on the square.

== Personal life ==
Whitaker married Nora Fogarty in 1941; they had six children. After his wife's death in 1994, he remarried, to Mary Moore, in 2005. The couple were invited to Áras an Uachtaráin in 2006 for his 90th birthday by the President of Ireland. Mary Moore Whitaker died in 2008. T. K. Whitaker turned 100 in December 2016 and died a month later on 9 January 2017, having survived both of his wives.

Whitaker and his family spoke Irish at home. The family spent a good deal of time in the North Mayo Gaeltacht after buying and renovating a former schoolhouse in Glencullen Lower, near Bangor Erris, in 1972. Whitaker was also a keen salmon angler in the nearby Carrowmore Lake and Owenmore.

Academic offices
Preceded by Éamon de Valera	Chancellor of the National University of Ireland; 1975–1996	Succeeded by Garret FitzGerald
