= Brian Hillery =

Irish politician (1937–2021)

Senator
- In office 17 February 1993 – 4 May 1994
- Constituency: Nominated by the Taoiseach
- In office 23 February 1983 – 11 June 1989
- In office 27 October 1977 – 13 May 1982
- Constituency: Labour Panel

Teachta Dála
- In office June 1989 – November 1992
- Constituency: Dún Laoghaire

Personal details
- Born: 22 November 1937 Spanish Point, County Clare, Ireland
- Died: 19 January 2021 (aged 83) Dublin, Ireland
- Party: Fianna Fáil
- Spouse: Miriam Hillery (m. 1973)
- Children: 5
- Relatives: Patrick Hillery (uncle)
- Education: University College Dublin; University of Georgia

Brian James Hillery (22 November 1937 – 19 January 2021) was an Irish Fianna Fáil politician and finance executive who served as a Senator from 1977 to 1982, 1983 to 1989 and 1992 to 1997 and a Teachta Dála (TD) for the Dún Laoghaire constituency from 1989 to 1992.

== Academic and political career ==
Hillery studied at University College Dublin (UCD) and the University of Georgia and worked in banking before joining the UCD faculty in 1967. He became the inaugural ESSO Professor of Industrial Relations in 1974.

Hillery's uncle, Patrick Hillery, was a Fianna Fáil TD and minister until 1973, and President of Ireland from 1976 to 1990. In 1977, Brian Hillery was elected to the 14th Seanad as a Fianna Fáil Senator for the Administrative Panel. In 1978, minister Gene Fitzgerald's suggestion that he chair the Commission on Industrial Relations was rejected by the Irish Congress of Trade Unions as party-political. After unsuccessfully contesting the 1981 general election in Dún Laoghaire, he was returned to the 15th Seanad, serving from 1981 to 1982. He did not sit in the brief 16th Seanad, but was re-elected to the 17th Seanad in 1983, where he served until he was elected a TD for Dún Laoghaire at the 1989 general election. At the 1992 general election, he lost his Dáil seat, which Barry Desmond attributed to a lack of constituency work. He was then nominated to the 20th Seanad by Taoiseach Albert Reynolds. He resigned as Senator in May 1994 when he was appointed to the European Bank for Reconstruction and Development (EBRD).

== Public and private sector board member ==
From 1994 to 1997, Hillery was an executive director at the EBRD in London representing Ireland and Denmark. He then became a director and, from 1999, chairman, of UniCredit's Irish operations at the Dublin International Financial Services Centre. Public sector advisory bodies on which Hillery served include the Government Review Body on Higher Remuneration in the Public Sector (1999–2007), the National Pensions Reserve Fund Commission (2004–2014), and the Irish commission of the Fulbright Program (2002–2004). He was a director of the Central Bank of Ireland and Financial Regulator from April 2008 until the bodies were reformed in October 2010. The Oireachtas joint committee of inquiry into the post-2008 banking crisis initially intended to ask him to make a statement but did not proceed with this.

Hillery was founding chairman from 1997 to 2015 of Providence Resources, a hydrocarbon company established by Tony O'Reilly. In 2003, he was appointed to the board of Independent News & Media, succeeding Tony O'Reilly as chairman in 2009 while O'Reilly remained chief executive. Hillery resigned in 2011 in the face of pressure from Denis O'Brien.

He died in January 2021.

Dáil	Election	Deputy (Party)	Deputy (Party)	Deputy (Party)	Deputy (Party)	Deputy (Party)
21st	1977	David Andrews (FF)	Liam Cosgrave (FG)	Barry Desmond (Lab)	Martin O'Donoghue (FF)	4 seats 1977–1981
22nd	1981	David Andrews (FF)	Liam T. Cosgrave (FG)	Barry Desmond (Lab)	Martin O'Donoghue (FF)	Seán Barrett (FG)
23rd	1982 (Feb)	David Andrews (FF)	Liam T. Cosgrave (FG)	Barry Desmond (Lab)	Martin O'Donoghue (FF)	Seán Barrett (FG)
24th	1982 (Nov)	David Andrews (FF)	Liam T. Cosgrave (FG)	Barry Desmond (Lab)	Monica Barnes (FG)	Seán Barrett (FG)
25th	1987	David Andrews (FF)	Geraldine Kennedy (PDs)	Barry Desmond (Lab)	Monica Barnes (FG)	Seán Barrett (FG)
26th	1989	David Andrews (FF)	Brian Hillery (FF)	Eamon Gilmore (WP)	Monica Barnes (FG)	Seán Barrett (FG)
27th	1992	David Andrews (FF)	Helen Keogh (PDs)	Eamon Gilmore (DL)	Niamh Bhreathnach (Lab)	Seán Barrett (FG)
28th	1997	David Andrews (FF)	Monica Barnes (FG)	Eamon Gilmore (Lab)	Mary Hanafin (FF)	Seán Barrett (FG)
29th	2002	Barry Andrews (FF)	Fiona O'Malley (PDs)	Eamon Gilmore (Lab)	Mary Hanafin (FF)	Ciarán Cuffe (GP)
30th	2007	Barry Andrews (FF)	Seán Barrett (Note: Served as Ceann Comhairle in the 31st Dáil from 2011 to 2016 and was returned automatically at the 2016 general election.) (FG)	Eamon Gilmore (Lab)	Mary Hanafin (FF)	Ciarán Cuffe (GP)
31st	2011	Mary Mitchell O'Connor (FG)	Seán Barrett (FG)	Eamon Gilmore (Lab)	Richard Boyd Barrett (PBP)	4 seats from 2011
32nd	2016	Mary Mitchell O'Connor (FG)	Seán Barrett (FG)	Maria Bailey (FG)	Richard Boyd Barrett (AAA–PBP)	4 seats from 2011
33rd	2020	Jennifer Carroll MacNeill (FG)	Ossian Smyth (GP)	Cormac Devlin (FF)	Richard Boyd Barrett (S–PBP)	4 seats from 2011
34th	2024	Jennifer Carroll MacNeill (FG)	Barry Ward (FG)	Cormac Devlin (FF)	Richard Boyd Barrett (PBP–S)	4 seats from 2011
