= John Blennerhassett (1930–2013) =

Irish politician (1930–2013)

Senator
- In office 27 October 1977 – 13 May 1982
- Constituency: Labour Panel
- In office 1 June 1973 – 27 October 1977
- Constituency: Nominated by the Taoiseach

Personal details
- Born: 1930; County Kerry, Ireland
- Died: 22 September 2013 (aged 82–83); County Kerry, Ireland
- Political party: Fine Gael
- Spouse: Veda Blennerhassett
- Children: 5

John Blennerhassett (1930 – 22 September 2013) was an Irish Fine Gael politician from County Kerry.

A farm owner and former drapery buyer, he stood unsuccessfully as a Fine Gael candidate for Dáil Éireann in the Kerry North constituency at the 1969, 1973, and 1977 general elections.

Blennerhassett did not stand for the Dáil again, but after his 1973 defeat he was nominated by the Taoiseach Liam Cosgrave to the 13th Seanad. He was re-elected in 1977 to the 14th Seanad and in 1981 to the 15th Seanad, but the party did not nominate him for the 1982 Seanad election. He blamed the Fine Gael leader Garret FitzGerald, and resigned from the party.

He was also a member of Kerry County Council from 1974 to 1991 and of Tralee Urban District Council from 1967 to 1994 and of Tralee Town Council from 1999 to 2004.

He died on 22 September 2013, aged 83.
