= Colette Kelleher =

Irish former politician (born 1962)

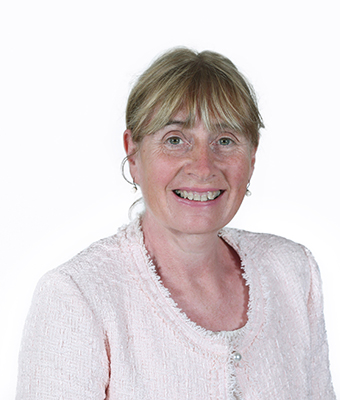
- Kelleher in 2016

Senator
- In office 8 June 2016 – 29 June 2020
- Constituency: Nominated by the Taoiseach

Personal details
- Born: 16 January 1962 (age 64) Macroom, County Cork, Ireland
- Party: Independent
- Other political affiliations: Civil Engagement group
- Children: 2
- Education: University College Cork; University of Southampton

Colette Kelleher (born 16 January 1962) is an Irish former independent politician who served as a Senator from 2016 to 2020, after being nominated by the Taoiseach. She previously was the CEO of the Alzheimer Society of Ireland.

She comes from Macroom, County Cork, and she formerly worked as a social worker in Dublin. She holds an MBA and led the Cork Simon Community for eight years before moving to the Cope Foundation.

She was a member of the Civil Engagement group in the 25th Seanad.
