= Olga Bennett =

Irish politician (born 1947)

Senator
- In office 1 November 1989 – 17 February 1993
- Constituency: Nominated by the Taoiseach

Personal details
- Born: October 1947 (age 78) Dublin, Ireland
- Party: Fianna Fáil

Olga Bennett (born October 1947) is a former Fianna Fáil politician from Dublin in Ireland. She was a senator from 1993 to 1997.

A fashion buyer before entering politics, she stood unsuccessfully as a Fianna Fáil candidate for Dáil Éireann in the Dublin West constituency at the 1987 and 1989 general elections. After her 1989 defeat, she was nominated by the Taoiseach Charles Haughey to the 19th Seanad.

At the 1992 general elections she stood in the Dublin Central constituency, where she again failed to win a seat, winning less than 3% of the first-preference votes. Bennett then contested the election to the 20th Seanad on the Industrial and Commercial Panel, but was not elected. She did not stand again for either the Dáil or Seanad.
