= Seán O'Donovan =

Irish politician and veterinarian (1893–1975)

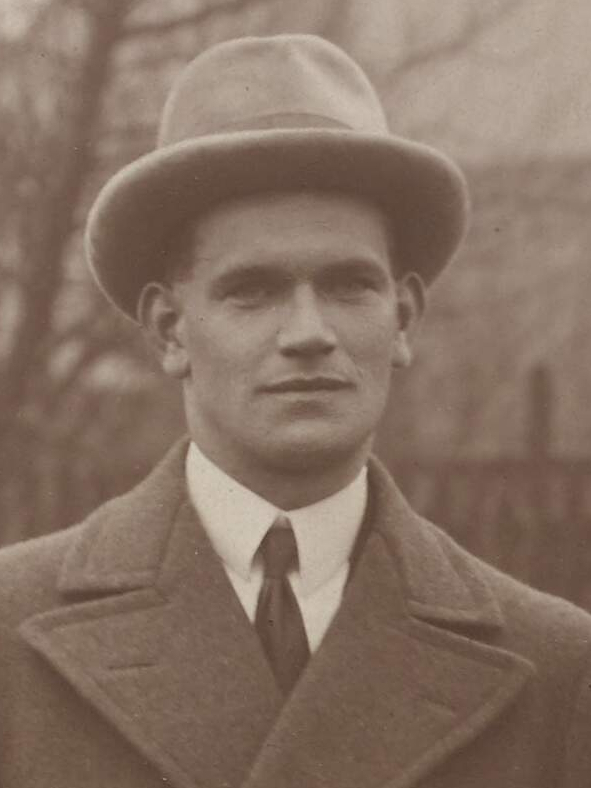
- O'Donovan in 1923

Senator
- In office 22 May 1957 – 5 November 1969
- In office 14 August 1951 – 22 July 1954
- Constituency: Nominated by the Taoiseach
- In office 27 April 1938 – 21 April 1948
- Constituency: Cultural and Educational Panel

Personal details
- Born: John James O'Donovan; 15 August 1893; Dublin, Ireland
- Died: 22 February 1975 (aged 81); Dublin, Ireland
- Political party: Fianna Fáil
- Spouse: Kathleen Boland
- Children: 5

Seán O'Donovan (15 August 1893 – 22 February 1975) was an Irish Fianna Fáil politician and vet. He was a member of Seanad Éireann from 1938 to 1948, 1951 to 1954 and 1957 to 1969. He was first elected to the 2nd Seanad in 1938 by the Cultural and Educational Panel. He did not serve in the 6th or 8th Seanad. From 1951 onwards, he was nominated by the Taoiseach. He lost his seat at the 1969 Seanad election.

He was married to Kathleen Boland, the sister of Irish politicians Harry Boland and Gerald Boland.
