= Michael Enright (politician) =

Irish politician (1952–1997)

Senator
- In office 13 June 1997 – 17 September 1997
- Constituency: Nominated by the Taoiseach

Personal details
- Born: 1952 County Clare, Ireland
- Died: 16 October 1997 (aged 45) County Wicklow, Ireland
- Party: Democratic Left
- Other political affiliations: Labour Party; Socialist Labour Party; Workers' Party
- Spouse: Mary Enright
- Children: 2

Michael Enright (1952 – 16 October 1997) was a Democratic Left politician from County Wexford in Ireland. He was a member of Wexford Corporation and served briefly as a senator in 1997.

Born in Ennis, County Clare, Enright was a teacher at Kilmuckridge Vocational School in County Wexford. An officer of Wexford Council of Trade Unions, he joined the Labour Party in 1973, and in the 1979 local elections he stood as a candidate for the Socialist Labour Party. He joined the Workers' Party in 1982 and was elected to Wexford Corporation in 1985; he remained a councillor until his death 12 years later. At the 1987 and 1989 general elections, he stood unsuccessfully as a Workers' Party candidate in the Wexford constituency, and also failed to win a seat in the European Parliament when he stood in the Leinster constituency at the 1989 European election.

When the Workers' Party split in 1992, he joined the breakaway Democratic Left, later becoming a member of the party's executive committee. He contested the 1992 and 1997 general elections as a Democratic Left candidate, but again failed to win a seat. He became a member of Teastas, the Irish National Certification Authority, when it was set up in 1995.

In June 1997 Enright was nominated by the Taoiseach, John Bruton, as a member of the outgoing 20th Seanad, serving until the elections in August for the 21st Seanad.

He died aged 45 on 16 October 1997. He was returning from a Teastas meeting in Dublin when his car was involved in a head-on collision near Arklow with a vehicle traveling at high speed without lights. Tributes were paid to him in both the Dáil and the Seanad.
