= Lorraine Higgins =

Irish barrister and former politician (born 1979)

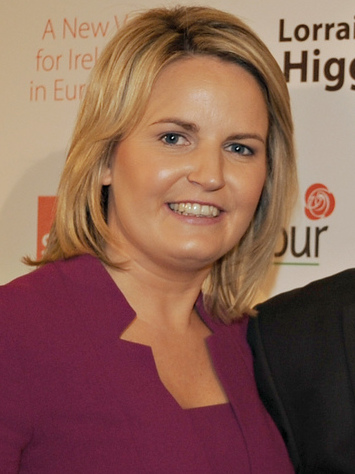
- Higgins in 2014

Senator
- In office 25 May 2011 – 8 June 2016
- Constituency: Nominated by the Taoiseach

Personal details
- Born: 3 August 1979 (age 46) Galway, Ireland
- Party: Labour Party
- Education: NUI Galway

Lorraine Higgins (born 3 August 1979) is an Irish barrister, and a former Labour Party politician who represented the party in the 24th Seanad after being nominated by the Taoiseach Enda Kenny. From Galway, she is a graduate of NUI Galway (acquiring a B.A. from the university in 2001) and, later, the King's Inns. During her time there she was Labour Party Seanad spokesperson on Reform and Foreign Affairs.

== Career ==
She ran as a candidate in the Galway East constituency at the 2011 general election. In May 2011, she was nominated by the Taoiseach Enda Kenny to the 24th Seanad.

Higgins was a candidate for the Labour Party in the Midlands–North-West constituency for the 2014 European Parliament election but failed to take a seat during one of the worst elections for the Labour Party.

She unsuccessfully contested the 2016 Irish general election for the Galway East constituency.

She was not selected for re-appointment to the 25th Seanad. Higgins complained about how "regrettable" it was that more women were not included in the parliamentary party. She was quoted as saying: "For me it was the last throw of the dice and I probably won't be involved in representative politics again".

In March 2017, Higgins became employed as Head of Public Affairs and Communications and as a board member with Retail Excellence. She was promoted to the position of CEO in July 2018.

She subsequently founded leading digital representative body, Digital Business Ireland, and Dublin-based consultancy company, Rockwood Public Affairs.

She was appointed to the position of Honorary Consul of the Slovak Republic in 2019.

In August 2020, she attended a golf party in County Galway which breached the COVID-19 guidelines.

== 2015 threats and harassment ==
During the summer of 2015, a man named Stephen French of Walkinstown sent her messages involving violent and antisemitic content, saying that he "will watch her bleed" and that he is "going to blow her fucking Jew nose right off". In the aftermath of the incidents, French was spared from serving time in jail and given a suspended six-month sentence after his guilty plea to three charges of threatening Higgins and two charges of harassing her.
