= Niamh Cosgrave =

Irish former politician (born 1964)

Senator
- In office 13 June 1997 – 17 September 1997
- Constituency: Nominated by the Taoiseach

Personal details
- Born: 9 October 1964 (age 61) Dublin, Ireland
- Party: Fine Gael
- Parent: Michael Joe Cosgrave (father)

Niamh Cosgrave (born 9 October 1964) is a former Fine Gael politician from Dublin, Ireland. She campaigned for victims of the Hepatitis C blood contamination scandal, and was the subject of a book on this. She was briefly a member of Seanad Éireann, the upper house of the Irish parliament, and, for several years, of Dublin City Council, which, in a very rare move, removed her for non-attendance. She later moved to France, where she survived a serious attack; she was subsequently the subject of a TV documentary.

== Early life ==
Cosgrave is the daughter of Fine Gael Teachta Dála (TD) Michael Joe Cosgrave.

== Anti-D ==
After she witnessed an RTÉ news report about contaminated blood, relating to anti-D, which concerned women that had received the product in 1977, Cosgrave recognised the symptoms, having received anti-D during the birth of her second child. She immediately presented for testing and tested positive for hepatitis C. She then began a campaign to have women that received the product in 1991 recognised. This was finally accepted by the Blood Transfusion Service Board and women infected in 1991 were acknowledged as recipients and received treatment and compensation.

Cosgrave was the first woman to go public about the failings of the BTSB, allowed herself to be photographed by The Irish Times, and contributed to the writing of a book Hep C, Niamh’s Story by Fergal Bowers. Cosgrave gave interviews and appeared on The Late Late Show in support of her representation of victims. Cosgrave was also one of the first victims to undergo experimental treatment with interferon and, despite advice to the contrary, went on to have two more, healthy, children.

== Political career ==
She was very briefly a member of Seanad Éireann - after standing unsuccessfully in the Dublin North-Central constituency at the 1997 general election, she was one of eight new senators nominated by the Taoiseach, John Bruton, to the 20th Seanad on 13 June 1997 to replace senators who had been elected to the 28th Dáil. After her nomination, the Seanad met only once (on 10 July 1997) before it was dissolved. In the 1997 Seanad elections, Cosgrave stood for election on the Labour Panel, but failed to win a seat.

At the 1999 local elections, Cosgrave was elected to Dublin City Council as a councillor for the Donaghmede electoral ward, which included Donaghmede and Raheny. As of 2003, she was secretary of the Fine Gael group on the council. She was re-elected in the 2004 local elections, but in July 2005, the Fine Gael party withdrew the party whip from her after she absented herself when Dublin councillors were electing the next Lord Mayor of Dublin, a role for which she had sought the party nomination herself. In 2006, sitting as an Independent councillor, she voted against Paddy Bourke, the Fine Gael–supported Labour Party candidate for Lord Mayor. This produced a tied vote - between Bourke and the Independent councillor Vincent Jackson - which was resolved in Jackson's favour by drawing names from a hat.

In June 2006, it was revealed that Cosgrave had the worst attendance record of any city councillor, with presence at just 17 out of 33 meetings over the preceding two years. In September 2007, she was deemed to have resigned her membership of the council for non-attendance, and expelled, having attended no meetings for six months; she was replaced by a co-opted fellow Fine Gael member, Pat Crimmins, who later won election.

== Personal life ==
Around the time of her removal from Dublin City Council, Cosgrave, who had been living in Raheny, was reported to have moved to France. It was later confirmed that she was living in a small French village, where she was later the victim of a violent rape; the attacker, a local, was later sentenced to 18 years for the attack. The judge in the case praised her courage. She later took part in a documentary called Unbreakable aired by TV3.
