= Eileen Cassidy =

Irish politician (1932–1995)

Senator
- In office 27 October 1977 – 8 July 1981
- Constituency: Nominated by the Taoiseach

Personal details
- Born: 22 August 1932 County Kildare, Ireland
- Died: 6 October 1995 (aged 63)
- Party: Fianna Fáil

Eileen Cassidy (22 August 1932 – 6 October 1995) was an Irish Fianna Fáil politician. A librarian, she was nominated by the Taoiseach to Seanad Éireann in 1977 and served until 1981.

She was killed in an accident along with her husband Judge John Cassidy in 1995.
