= Bill Cashin =

Irish politician (1938–2023)

Senator
- In office 17 February 1993 – 17 September 1997
- Constituency: Nominated by the Taoiseach

Personal details
- Born: 1938
- Died: 21 July 2023 (aged 85)
- Party: Labour Party
- Spouse: Rita Browne
- Children: 3

William Cashin (1938 – 21 July 2023) was an Irish Labour Party politician.

== Biography ==
William Cashin was born in 1938.

Cashin served as a member of Seanad Éireann for four years, to which he was nominated by the Taoiseach Albert Reynolds in 1993. He was an unsuccessful candidate for the Cork North-West constituency at the 1992 and 1997 general elections.

Cashin died on 21 July 2023, aged 85.
