= Cathy Honan =

Irish politician (born 1951)

Senator
- In office 17 February 1993 – 17 September 1997
- Constituency: Industrial and Commercial Panel

Personal details
- Born: Catherine Honan; 16 September 1951 (age 74) County Laois, Ireland
- Party: Progressive Democrats

Catherine Honan (born 16 September 1951) is a former Progressive Democrats politician from County Laois in Ireland. She was a Senator from 1993 to 1997.

An accountant before entering politics, she stood unsuccessfully as a Progressive Democrats candidate for Dáil Éireann in the Laois–Offaly constituency at four successive general elections: 1987, 1989, 1992 and 1997. After her 1992 defeat, she was elected to the 20th Seanad by the Industrial and Commercial Panel; this was facilitated by an electoral pact with Democratic Left. She did not contest the 1997 Seanad election.
