= Margaret Mary Pearse =

Irish politician (1878–1968)

Senator
- In office 22 May 1957 – 7 November 1968
- In office 14 August 1951 – 22 July 1954
- In office 8 September 1943 – 21 April 1948
- Constituency: Nominated by the Taoiseach
- In office 22 July 1954 – 22 May 1957
- In office 21 April 1948 – 14 August 1951
- In office 27 April 1938 – 8 September 1943
- Constituency: Administrative Panel

Teachta Dála
- In office January 1933 – July 1937
- Constituency: Dublin County

Personal details
- Born: 4 August 1878 Dublin, Ireland
- Died: 7 November 1968 (aged 90) Dublin, Ireland
- Party: Fianna Fáil
- Parent: Margaret Pearse (mother)
- Relatives: Patrick Pearse (brother); Willie Pearse (brother)
- Occupation: Politician, Teacher

Margaret Mary Pearse (4 August 1878 – 7 November 1968) was an Irish Fianna Fáil politician and teacher. She was the sister of Patrick and Willie Pearse, two of the leaders of the 1916 Easter Rising.

== Early life ==
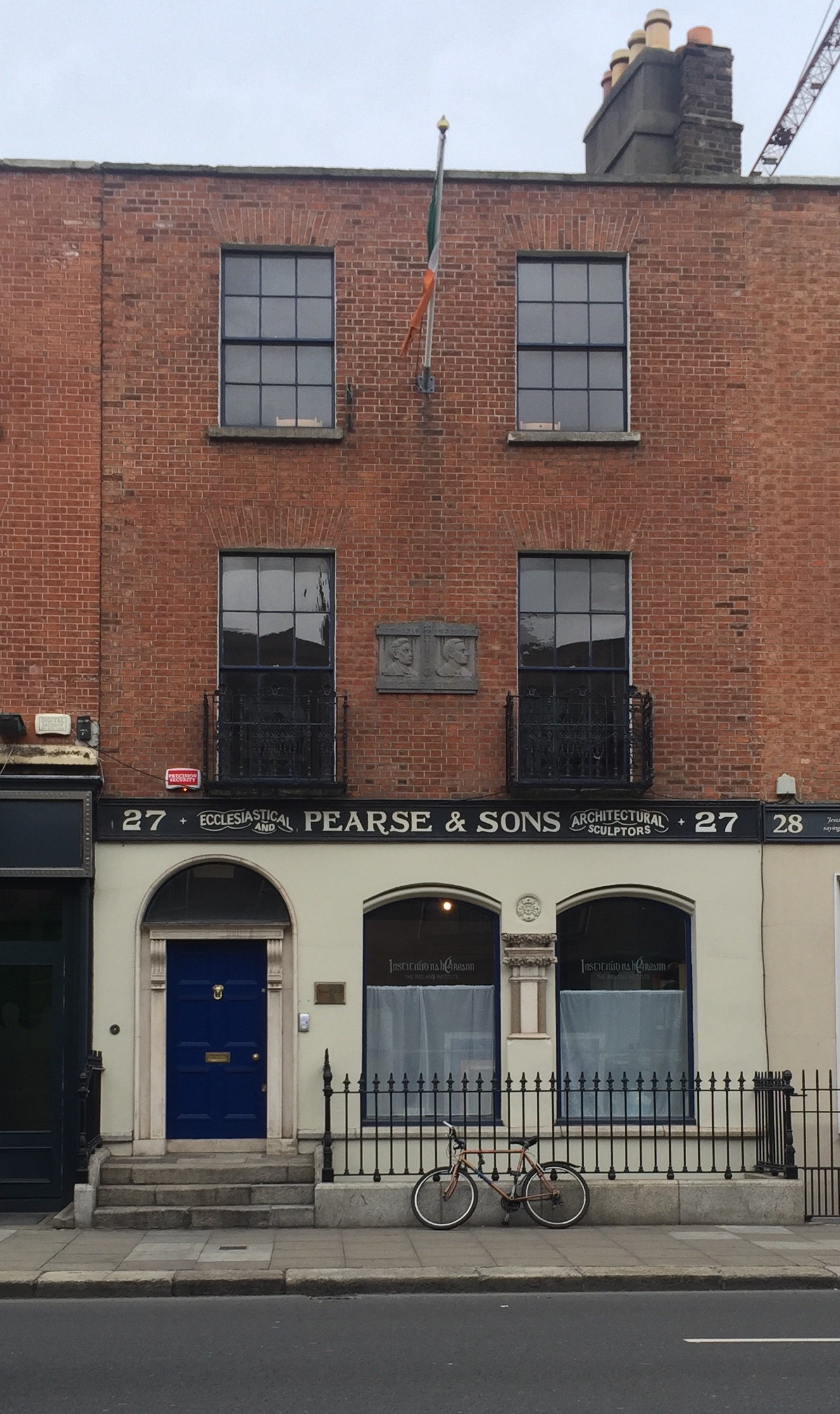
The Pearse family home in 27 Great Brunswick Street, in Dublin.

Margaret Mary Pearse was born at 27 Great Brunswick Street, in Dublin, the eldest child of James Pearse and Margaret Pearse (née Brady). She grew up in cramped living conditions as often the other rooms in the house were rented to subtenants, leaving the Pearse family to share one room. During her childhood, Margaret was very friendly with James Vincent, her half-brother from her father's previous marriage. Their close relationship did not follow into adulthood. She developed a close bond with her father, more so than with her mother.

She was educated at the Holy Faith Convent in Glasnevin. After leaving school, she trained as a teacher. Margaret did not enter paid employment after receiving her teacher training but was still interested in education. In 1905 she travelled to Belgium with her brother to study the workings of the bilingual education system and to improve her French. She tried to set up her own school for infants in 1907 in the family home on Great Brunswick Street and was constantly encouraged by her two brothers, whom assisted her in teaching on many occasions. Her younger brother Willie provided art work for the classes to inspire the students.

== Involvement with St. Enda's School ==
Margaret helped to found St. Enda's School with her brothers Patrick and Willie in 1908. Margaret, along with her mother Mrs. Pearse, played an intricate part in making the school a comfortable atmosphere for the students. The school's prospectus lists Margaret as the Mistress of Preparatory Schools between 1909 and 1910 and as the Assistant Mistress between 1910 and 1911.

Following the executions of her brothers in the aftermath of the Easter Rising, Margaret continued to run St. Enda's School. She was the matron and housekeeper for the school, while her mother was the headmaster. The school began to experience financial difficulties in 1916 after the Easter rising, and was facing closure. Trips to the USA were made to raise funds for the school. The school was saved mostly by donations and continued to operate even though it was operating at a loss.

Margaret was directly involved with the teaching as French teacher to junior pupils, and would often write to them to keep in contact during the holidays. During the period when the school experienced staff shortages, Margaret became even more involved with the school's affairs. Her involvement helped to feed her busy and hardworking nature.

In 1926, Margaret went to America on a lecture tour with the intention of raising more funds for the school to cover its running costs. Margaret and her mother constantly fought over how to spend the money and eventually they raised enough to buy the school grounds. Margaret's mother had planned to leave St. Enda's to the state in her will. However, due to legal complications, Margaret Mary inherited St.Enda's after Mrs Pearse's death in 1932. St. Enda's closed in 1935 and Margaret continued to lived in the Hermitage.

Margaret did not always plan to leave St. Enda's to the state after her death as per her mother's wishes. Eamonn de Barra along with President at the time Éamon de Valera, influenced her decision to leave the school and its grounds to the state. The government also played an important part in persuading Margaret to leave the school to the nation. It guaranteed that St. Enda's will always act as a memorial for Margaret's two brothers Patrick and William Pearse, and this seemed to be the final deciding factor for Margaret. An agreement was settled that while she was alive she would still be the full owner of the school and its grounds, and upon her death, the schools, its contents and the surrounding land would be given to the state.

== Political career ==
She was first elected to Dáil Éireann as a Fianna Fáil Teachta Dála (TD) for the Dublin County constituency at the 1933 general election. She was described as a spinster from St. Enda's College in Rathfarnham. She was proposed for the position by Dr. James J.McCann of 23 Terenure Road.This was seconded by Frank Burke, St. Enda's, Harolds Grange, County Dublin.

She was defeated at 1937 general election by losing on the 7th count of votes. On 29 March 1938, she was elected to the Administrative Panel of the 2nd Seanad. Although she had rarely spoken out in the Dáil or Seanad, or posed any questions, she was described as being a hard worker behind the scenes and rarely missed any meetings. She was often referred to as 'Maggie' by her colleagues.

She served in the Seanad until her death in 1968. However, she and her mother were never more than figureheads for the party. She was a founding member of the teaching staff of Ardscoil Éanna in Crumlin, Dublin, upon its establishment in 1939. Her mother Margaret Pearse also served as a TD in the 1920s and she and Margaret Mary supported de Valera because they believed he attempted to sustain Patrick Pearse's political vision.

== Family relations ==
Margaret and her sister Mary became increasingly estranged from one another due to their many disagreements. Margaret devoted the rest of her life preserving her brothers' memory and supported her brothers' involvement in the rising while Mary opposed it. Mary was also prone to anxiety and hypochondria. Margaret and her mother became very religious and glorified their family's part in the rising at the expense of other insurgents. They quickly condemned anyone who questioned or spoke out against the Pearse brothers. After the execution of Patrick and Willie, Margaret, Mary and her mother tried to have their bodies released but were refused.

== Later life ==
Margaret's relationship with her sister was further strained after Mary Brigid published The Home-Life of Pádraig Pearse. This edited version of their brother, Patrick's, unfinished autobiography led to a dispute over the royalties from their brother's writings as Margaret Mary believed it belonged to both of them. A court hearing was set up, however, a last minute reconciliation saw it called off. They never repaired their relationship and Mary Brigid died in 1947, twenty-one years before Margaret Mary.

Illness forced Margaret into the Linden Convalescent Home in Blackrock, County Dublin when she was in her 80s. In 1965, the chairman of the Dublin Red Cross Committee awarded Margaret with a certificate for her outstanding service and contribution to the Irish Red Cross Society. She had founded the Rathfarnham Red Cross branch and she had allowed her home in St. Enda's to be used as a first aid hospital. She was still a patient in the Linden Convalescent Home at the time this award was bestowed upon her.

In 1967 when she was 89 years old, her condition was described to be deteriorating. However, in 1968 during the upcoming months of Margaret's 90th birthday, she left the Linden Convalescent Home for a short while in order to spend her birthday at St. Enda's in Rathfarnham. The president of Ireland at the time, Éamon de Valera, went to visit her at St. Enda's to congratulate her on her upcoming 90th birthday. Other visitors included the Minister for Finance Charles Haughey and the Lord Mayor of Dublin Frank Cluskey.

== Death ==
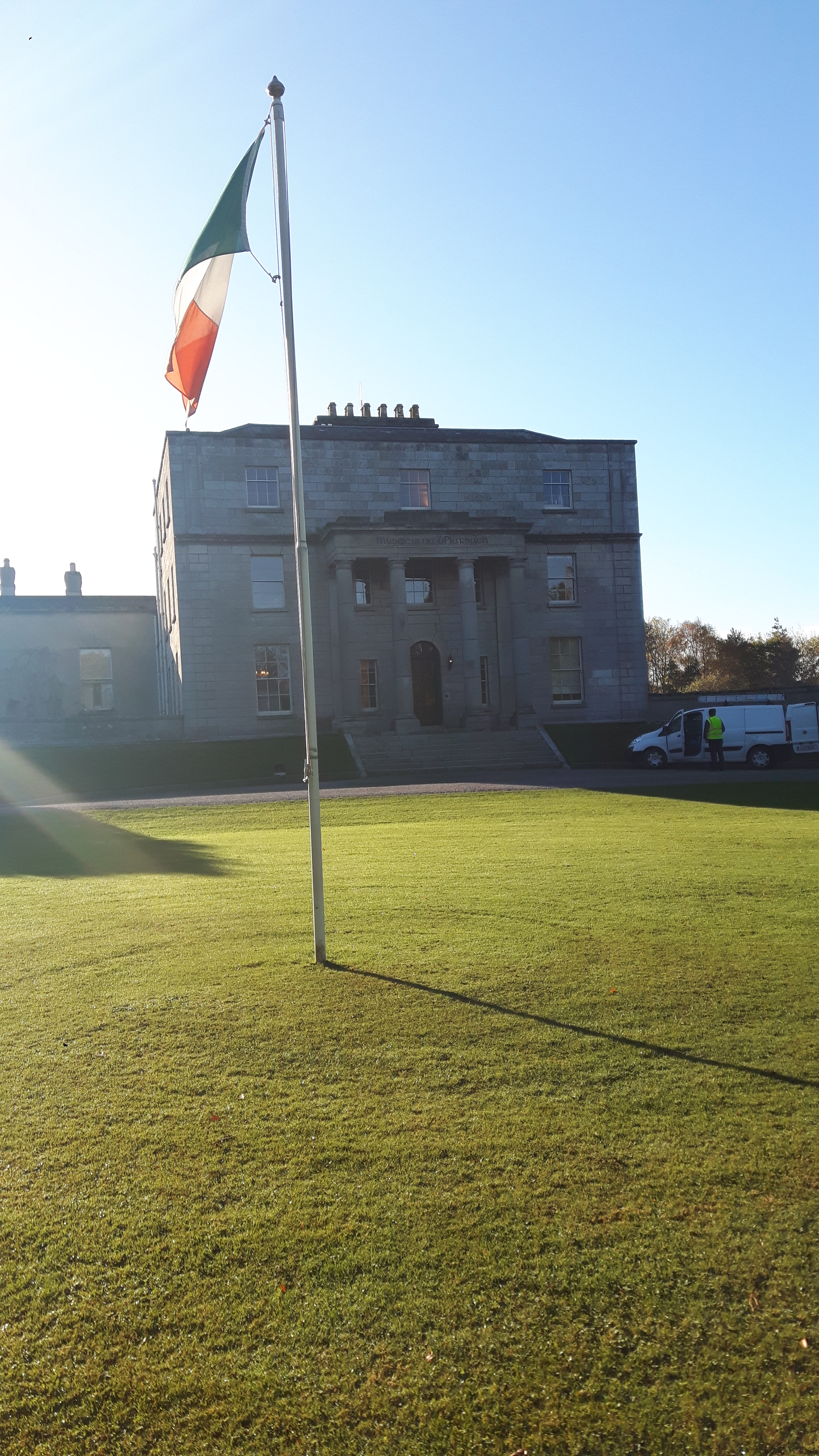
The Pearse Museum located in Haroldsgrange, Dublin.

Margaret Pearse died aged 90, unmarried, at the Linden Convalescent Home, Blackrock, Dublin, on 7 November 1968 and was given a state funeral. Margaret was buried beside her parents and sister at Glasnevin cemetery. President de Valera, the church and the state all paid tribute to her at the funeral. Over 200 soldiers gave her a military honour and traffic was halted as people paid their last respects. The funeral then passed through Rathfarnham village where 200 boys and girls from St. Enda's School lined the route in tribute. As per her mother's wishes, she bequeathed St. Enda's to the people of Ireland as a memorial to her brother's sacrifice. The school is now home to Pearse Museum.

== See also ==
- Families in the Oireachtas

Dáil	Election	Deputy (Party)	Deputy (Party)	Deputy (Party)	Deputy (Party)	Deputy (Party)	Deputy (Party)	Deputy (Party)	Deputy (Party)
2nd	1921	Michael Derham (SF)	George Gavan Duffy (SF)	Séamus Dwyer (SF)	Desmond FitzGerald (SF)	Frank Lawless (SF)	Margaret Pearse (SF)	6 seats 1921–1923	
3rd	1922	Michael Derham (PT-SF)	George Gavan Duffy (PT-SF)	Thomas Johnson (Lab)	Desmond FitzGerald (PT-SF)	Darrell Figgis (Ind)	John Rooney (FP)	6 seats 1921–1923	
4th	1923	Michael Derham (CnaG)	Bryan Cooper (Ind)	Thomas Johnson (Lab)	Desmond FitzGerald (CnaG)	Darrell Figgis (Ind)	John Good (Ind)	Kathleen Lynn (Rep)	Kevin O'Higgins (CnaG)
4th	1924 by-election	Batt O'Connor (CnaG)	Bryan Cooper (Ind)	Thomas Johnson (Lab)	Desmond FitzGerald (CnaG)	Darrell Figgis (Ind)	John Good (Ind)	Kathleen Lynn (Rep)	Kevin O'Higgins (CnaG)
4th	1926 by-election	Batt O'Connor (CnaG)	Bryan Cooper (Ind)	Thomas Johnson (Lab)	Desmond FitzGerald (CnaG)	William Norton (Lab)	John Good (Ind)	Kathleen Lynn (Rep)	Kevin O'Higgins (CnaG)
5th	1927 (Jun)	Batt O'Connor (CnaG)	Bryan Cooper (Ind)	Thomas Johnson (Lab)	Desmond FitzGerald (CnaG)	Patrick Belton (FF)	John Good (Ind)	Seán MacEntee (FF)	Kevin O'Higgins (CnaG)
5th	1927 by-election	Batt O'Connor (CnaG)	Bryan Cooper (Ind)	Thomas Johnson (Lab)	Desmond FitzGerald (CnaG)	Patrick Belton (FF)	John Good (Ind)	Seán MacEntee (FF)	Gearóid O'Sullivan (CnaG)
6th	1927 (Sep)	Batt O'Connor (CnaG)	Bryan Cooper (CnaG)	Joseph Murphy (Ind)	Desmond FitzGerald (CnaG)	Seán Brady (FF)	John Good (Ind)	Seán MacEntee (FF)	Gearóid O'Sullivan (CnaG)
6th	1930 by-election	Batt O'Connor (CnaG)	Thomas Finlay (CnaG)	Joseph Murphy (Ind)	Desmond FitzGerald (CnaG)	Seán Brady (FF)	John Good (Ind)	Seán MacEntee (FF)	Gearóid O'Sullivan (CnaG)
7th	1932	Batt O'Connor (CnaG)	Thomas Finlay (CnaG)	Patrick Curran (Lab)	Henry Dockrell (CnaG)	Seán Brady (FF)	John Good (Ind)	Seán MacEntee (FF)	Gearóid O'Sullivan (CnaG)
8th	1933	Batt O'Connor (CnaG)	John A. Costello (CnaG)	Margaret Mary Pearse (FF)	Henry Dockrell (CnaG)	Seán Brady (FF)	John Good (Ind)	Seán MacEntee (FF)	Gearóid O'Sullivan (CnaG)
8th	1935 by-election	Cecil Lavery (FG)	John A. Costello (CnaG)	Margaret Mary Pearse (FF)	Henry Dockrell (CnaG)	Seán Brady (FF)	John Good (Ind)	Seán MacEntee (FF)	Gearóid O'Sullivan (CnaG)
9th	1937	Cecil Lavery (FG)	Henry Dockrell (FG)	Gerrard McGowan (Lab)	Patrick Fogarty (FF)	Seán Brady (FF)	5 seats 1937–1948		
10th	1938	Patrick Belton (FG)	Henry Dockrell (FG)	Thomas Mullen (FF)	Patrick Fogarty (FF)	Seán Brady (FF)	5 seats 1937–1948		
11th	1943	Liam Cosgrave (FG)	Henry Dockrell (FG)	James Tunney (Lab)	Patrick Fogarty (FF)	Seán Brady (FF)	5 seats 1937–1948		
12th	1944	Liam Cosgrave (FG)	Henry Dockrell (FG)	Patrick Burke (FF)	Patrick Fogarty (FF)	Seán Brady (FF)	5 seats 1937–1948		
12th	1947 by-election	Liam Cosgrave (FG)	Henry Dockrell (FG)	Patrick Burke (FF)	Seán MacBride (CnaP)	Seán Brady (FF)	5 seats 1937–1948		
13th	1948	Éamon Rooney (FG)	Seán Dunne (Lab)	Patrick Burke (FF)	3 seats 1948–1961				
14th	1951	Éamon Rooney (FG)	Seán Dunne (Lab)	Patrick Burke (FF)	3 seats 1948–1961				
15th	1954	Éamon Rooney (FG)	Seán Dunne (Lab)	Patrick Burke (FF)	3 seats 1948–1961				
16th	1957	Éamon Rooney (FG)	Kevin Boland (FF)	Patrick Burke (FF)	3 seats 1948–1961				
17th	1961	Éamon Rooney (FG)	Kevin Boland (FF)	Patrick Burke (FF)	Mark Clinton (FG)	Seán Dunne (Ind)	5 seats 1961–1969		
18th	1965	Des Foley (FF)	Kevin Boland (FF)	Patrick Burke (FF)	Mark Clinton (FG)	Seán Dunne (Lab)	5 seats 1961–1969		
19th	1969	Constituency abolished. See Dublin County North and Dublin County South							
