= Camilla Hannon =

Irish politician (born 1936)

Senator
- In office 13 May 1982 – 23 February 1983
- Constituency: Nominated by the Taoiseach

Personal details
- Born: 21 July 1936 (age 89)
- Party: Fianna Fáil

Camilla Hannon (born 21 July 1936) is an Irish former Fianna Fáil politician. She was nominated by the Taoiseach to Seanad Éireann in 1982.
