= Aidan O'Connor (politician) =

Irish former politician

Senator
- In office 13 June 1997 – 17 September 1997
- Constituency: Nominated by the Taoiseach

Personal details
- Political party: Fine Gael

Aidan O'Connor is a former Fine Gael member of Seanad Éireann. In June 1997, he was nominated by the Taoiseach, John Bruton as member of the outgoing 20th Seanad, serving until the elections in August 1997 for the 21st Seanad.
