= Evanne Ní Chuilinn =

Irish politician

Senator Evanne Ní Chuilinn
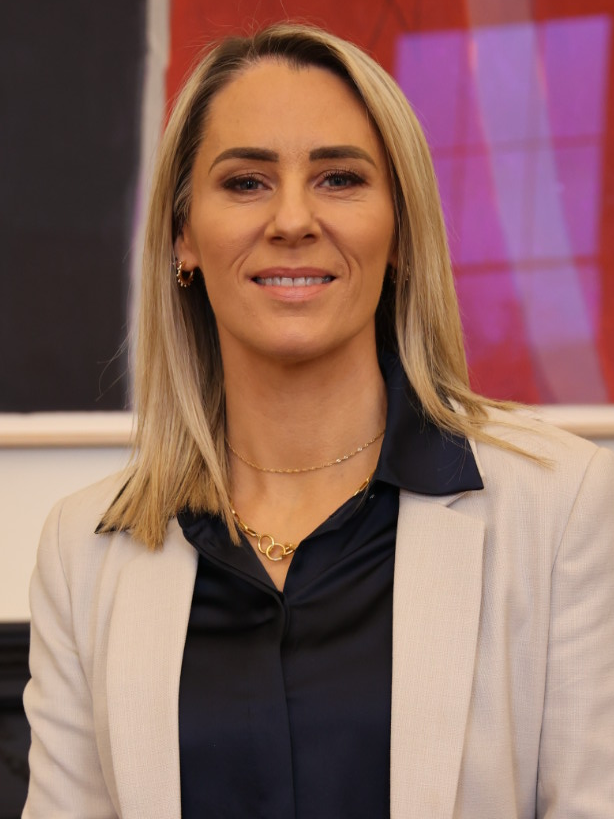
- Ní Chuilinn in 2025

Senator
- Incumbent
- Assumed office 7 February 2025
- Constituency: Nominated by the Taoiseach

Personal details
- Born: 5 September 1981 (age 44) Kilkenny, Ireland
- Party: Fine Gael
- Spouse: Brian Fitzsimons (m. 2013)
- Children: 3
- Education: Dublin City University; University College Dublin; NUI Galway
- Occupation: Sports journalist, television presenter

Evanne Ní Chuilinn (born 5 September 1981) is an Irish Fine Gael politician who has served as a senator since February 2025 after being nominated by the Taoiseach. She was previously a sports journalist and television presenter for RTÉ. She worked as a sports news presenter on RTÉ News: Six One.

== Career ==
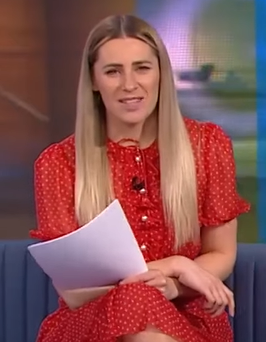
Ní Chuilinn on RTÉ News: Six One

Ní Chuilinn began her career as a sub-editor with RTÉ Sport in 2004 where she worked behind the scenes on various sports programmes. She progressed onto RTÉ Radio 1 and RTÉ 2fm where she delivered the hourly sports bulletins, as well as co-presenting various live Gaelic games broadcasts. A move to television in 2006 saw Ní Chuilinn work as a reporter on minority sports programme, OB Sport. She became the sideline reporter for The Sunday Game in 2007.

In 2008 Ní Chuilinn started working for RTÉ News, initially as a sports reporter, and shortly afterwards as a sports news presenter on RTÉ News: Six One. Since then she has covered several major sporting events, including the Olympic Games.

Ní Chuilinn was the presenter of the Sunday Game Beo Irish language programme on RTÉ during the 2023 All-Ireland Senior Hurling and Football finals, the first time a full live programme was broadcast in Irish on RTÉ, with both analysis and commentary.

On 7 February 2025, Ní Chuilinn resigned from her role in RTÉ after being nominated as a Fine Gael senator in the 27th Seanad.

== Personal life ==
Ní Chuilinn graduated from NUI Galway. She is married and has three children.
