= Maria Corrigan =

Irish politician

Senator
- In office 13 September 2007 – 25 May 2011
- Constituency: Nominated by the Taoiseach

Personal details
- Party: Fianna Fáil
- Education: University College Dublin

Maria Corrigan is a former Irish Fianna Fáil politician who served as a Senator from 2007 to 2011, after being nominated by the Taoiseach.

She was a member Dún Laoghaire–Rathdown County Council for the Glencullen local electoral area from 1999 to 2007. She was an unsuccessful candidate at the 2002, 2007 and 2011 general elections for the Dublin South constituency and was also unsuccessful at the Seanad election for the Administrative Panel in 2007. She was nominated by the Taoiseach, Bertie Ahern to Seanad Éireann in August 2007.

Corrigan was the Fianna Fáil Seanad spokesperson for Disability, Mental Health, Environment and Energy. She was a member of the Houses of the Oireachtas Joint Committee for Communications, Joint Committee for the Constitutional Referendum for the Rights of the Child.

She is a member of the Psychological Society of Ireland, Combat Poverty Agency, the National Advisory Committee for Drugs (NCAD) and the National Economic and Social Forum.
