= Robert Fausset =

Irish politician (1934–2011)

Senator
- In office 8 October 1981 – 13 May 1982
- Constituency: Nominated by the Taoiseach

Personal details
- Born: 8 August 1934 County Cavan, Ireland
- Died: 9 November 2011 (aged 77) County Cavan, Ireland
- Party: Fine Gael
- Spouse: Ena Fausset
- Children: 2

Robert Fausset (8 August 1934 – 9 November 2011) was an Irish Fine Gael politician from County Cavan. He was nominated to Seanad Éireann in October 1981 and served until April 1982. He was a member of Cavan County Council for the Ballyjamesduff electoral area from 1999 to 2004. He stood for election to Dáil Éireann for Cavan–Monaghan, at the 1981 and February 1982 general elections, but was unsuccessful on both occasions.
