= Seán Fallon (politician) =

Irish politician (1914–2010)

Cathaoirleach of Seanad Éireann
- In office 23 January 1992 – 4 July 1995
- Preceded by: Seán Doherty
- Succeeded by: Liam Naughten

Senator
- In office 8 October 1981 – 4 July 1995
- Constituency: Industrial and Commercial Panel

Personal details
- Born: 26 September 1937 Athlone, County Westmeath, Ireland
- Died: 4 July 1995 (aged 57) County Westmeath, Ireland
- Party: Fianna Fáil
- Spouse: Anne Fallon
- Children: 4

Seán Fallon (26 September 1937 – 4 July 1995) was an Irish Fianna Fáil politician from Athlone, County Westmeath.

A member of Westmeath County Council and Athlone Urban District Council for nearly forty years from 1967, he was a senator from 1981 to 1995, and Cathaoirleach of Seanad Éireann from 1992 until his death.

He was first elected in 1981, to the 15th Seanad, on the Industrial and Commercial Panel, and was returned to the Seanad in subsequent elections until his death.

Oireachtas
Preceded by Seán Doherty	Cathaoirleach of Seanad Éireann; 1992–1995	Succeeded by Liam Naughten
