= Nikki Bradley =

Irish politician and disability activist (born 1986)

Senator Nikki Bradley
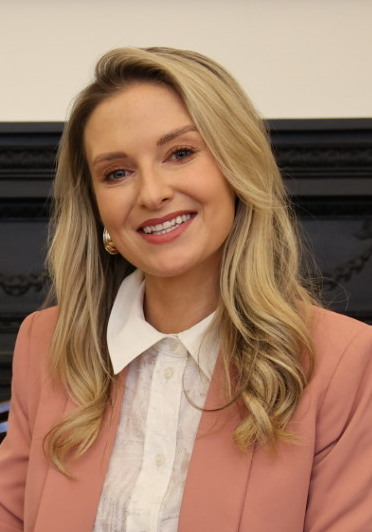
- Bradley in 2025

Senator
- Incumbent
- Assumed office 10 July 2024
- Constituency: Nominated by the Taoiseach

Personal details
- Born: 23 January 1986 (age 40) County Donegal, Ireland
- Party: Fine Gael

Nikki Bradley (born 23 January 1986) is an Irish Fine Gael politician who has served as a senator since July 2024. She is also a disability rights advocate and a motivational speaker.

== Disability work ==
Bradley is from Milford, County Donegal. Diagnosed with Ewing sarcoma in 2002, at age 16, she has used crutches since 2013, following two hip replacements. Since 2013, she has undertaken a variety of physical-fitness challenges, such as climbing four mountains (Carrauntoohil, Croagh Patrick, Slieve Donard and Errigal) in 32 hours. She has documented these challenges as part of her "Fighting Fit for Ewing's" online awareness campaign. She has also worked with other disability organisations. In 2022, she had a partial leg amputation and rotationplasty.

== Political career ==
On 10 July 2024, Bradley was nominated to the 26th Seanad by the Taoiseach, Simon Harris, to fill the vacancy caused by the election of Regina Doherty to the European Parliament. In a statement accepting the nomination, she said that she planned to speak on disability issues, the defective block crisis, and voter turnout among young voters. On 11 July she was formally introduced to the Seanad and made her maiden speech.

Bradley contested the 2024 general election, standing as one of two Fine Gael candidates in the Donegal constituency. She received 3,658 first-preference votes (4.7%) and was eliminated on the 14th count with 6,176 votes overall. Neither she nor her Fine Gael running mate was elected, marking the first time since the 1930s that the party did not win a seat in Donegal. Bradley's post-election interviews sparked anger and went viral after she claimed that a "negative attitude" persisted in Donegal and that voters were "moaning and groaning" about issues. She later issued an apology for her comments.

On 7 February 2025, Bradley was nominated to the 27th Seanad by the Taoiseach.
