= Mary Kelly (politician) =

Irish politician (born 1952)

Senator
- In office 17 February 1993 – 17 September 1997
- Constituency: Cultural and Educational Panel

Personal details
- Born: 1 May 1952 (age 73) County Limerick, Ireland
- Party: Labour Party

Mary Kelly (born 1952) is a former Labour Party politician from County Limerick in Ireland. She was elected as a member of Limerick County Council in 1991, serving as a Labour Party Councillor until 1999, representing the Newcastle Electoral Area. She served as a senator from 1993 to 1997.

A teacher and bookshop proprietor from Newcastle West, Kelly stood as a Labour candidate for Dáil Éireann in the Limerick West constituency at the 1992 general election and did not win a seat. However, she achieved the highest number of votes ever for a Labour Party candidate in that constituency. In the subsequent elections to the 20th Seanad, she was elected on the Cultural and Educational Panel.

After a further defeat in the 1997 general election she did not stand in the 1997 elections to the 21st Seanad.
