= Cope Foundation =

Non-profit Organisation

Cope Foundation is a not-for-profit voluntary organisation, formed on 29 May 1957. Cope supports approximately 2,150 children and adults with intellectual disabilities and/or autism throughout Cork city and county in Ireland.

== History ==
Cope started in the 1950s as the Cork Poliomyelitis Association. After Cork's polio epidemic in the 1950s, many children who recovered from that disease were left with disabilities. However, no rehabilitative services were available either in the city or county. Cllr. John Bermingham founded the Cork Poliomyelitis Association to provide them with physiotherapy services.

Working out of a single room, the association soon moved to a specially adapted and equipped clinic known as The Polio Clinic. The Association worked to integrate children who were polio survivors back into the mainstream education system. Gradually the association's responsibilities to these children diminished as their health improved, and they started attending ordinary schools.

The Association soon began providing services for children with intellectual disabilities. Before then, these children were kept at home or placed in institutions ill-equipped to care for them properly. In 1958, the Association opened the Scoil Bernadette school for these children. It was followed by the opening of a residential school, Queen of Angels (Scoil Eanna).

On 30 May 1958, the Cork Poliomyelitis Association was renamed the Cork Polio and General After-care Association to reflect its new direction. The Association soon began to treat children of all age ranges with all degrees of intellectual disability. The services included pre-school and education, vocational training and placement, varying occupation and employment, leisure facilities, and retirement options with a range of residential facilities throughout Cork city and county.

On 5 December 1988, the Cork Polio and General After-Care Association became the Cope Foundation.

In April 2020, Cope began a fundraising campaign to purchase smart phones and tablets for residents who no longer have face-to-face contact with their families as a result of the COVID-19 pandemic.

== Work ==
Cope Foundation operates through a network of community based supports at over 65 locations in Cork city and county. These supports include:

- Adult Day Services
- Community Participation
- Early Intervention Services
- Elderly Services
- Post School Training Services
- Residential Services
- Respite/Short Break Services
- Schools

== Fundraising ==
The Cope Foundation, which is in the Irish Times "Top 1000 Companies", is mostly funded by the Department of Health, The Department of Education and Health Service Executive and employs around 800 people. In 2011 Cope Foundation received funding for 74% of its €60.82 million total annual expenses from the HSE. In the same year €1.24 million came from public fundraising which accounted for 2%.
