= Mick Lanigan =

Irish former politician (born 1938

Senator
- In office 17 February 1993 – 12 September 2002
- In office 27 October 1977 – 1 November 1989
- Constituency: Industrial and Commercial Panel
- In office 1 November 1989 – 17 February 1993
- Constituency: Nominated by the Taoiseach

Personal details
- Born: 30 January 1938 (age 88) County Kilkenny, Ireland
- Party: Fianna Fáil

Michael Lanigan (born 30 January 1938) is a retired Irish company director and Fianna Fáil politician from County Kilkenny. He was a senator from 1977 to 2002, and was noted in the Seanad for his interest in foreign affairs, particularly humanitarian issues and the Palestinian cause.

== Political career ==
At the 1977 general election, Lanigan stood in the Carlow–Kilkenny constituency but failed to win a seat to the 21st Dáil. In the subsequent elections to the 14th Seanad, he was elected on the Industrial and Commercial Panel.

Lanigan stood again for the Dáil at the 1981 general election and November 1982 general elections in Carlow–Kilkenny, but was unsuccessful on both occasions. He was re-elected on the Industrial and Commercial Panel to each successive Seanad until his defeat at the 1989 elections, when he was nominated by the Taoiseach, Charles Haughey, to the 19th Seanad.

He was re-elected on the Industrial and Commercial Panel in 1993 to the 20th and in 1997 to the 21st Seanad. He retired at the 2002 election to the 22nd Seanad.

Lanigan was leader of the opposition Fianna Fáil group in the 17th Seanad (1983–1987), and was Leader of the Seanad in the 18th Seanad (1987–1989). He was reappointed as Leader in the 19th Seanad in 1989, but resigned (along with all the Fianna Fáil whips) in May 1990 after the government lost a series of votes when no Fianna Fáil senators were present in the chamber. He later served as Chairman of the Oireachtas Joint Committee on Foreign Affairs.

Lanigan was noted as a supporter of an independent Palestinian state. Lanigan founded the Friends of Palestine in the Oireachtas. In December 2003 he was awarded the Order of Bethlehem by Palestinian President Yasser Arafat. The Order, which is the highest honour bestowed on behalf of the Palestinian people, was made at a ceremony in Ramallah in which Arafat commended Lanigan for having supported the Palestinian cause "when it was not popular to do so".

Lanigan continues to be involved with the Palestinian cause, in his capacity as chairman of Irish Medical Aid for Palestine. The organisation works with all sectors of Palestinian society and with sister organisations from outside Palestine for the improvement of health in Palestine. In addition, Lanigan is a member of the Oxfam Ireland Members council.

His son, also called Mick, was a member of Kilkenny Borough Council and Kilkenny County Council from 1999 to 2009.

== Sporting achievements ==
Lanigan was an accomplished athlete. He was successful in the 100 metre hurdles at the Catholic International Student Games, before going on to win further national and international honours on the track. Lanigan was one of the founding members of the Kilkenny City Harriers athletics club in 1953.
