= Jillian van Turnhout =

Irish activist and former politician (born 1968)

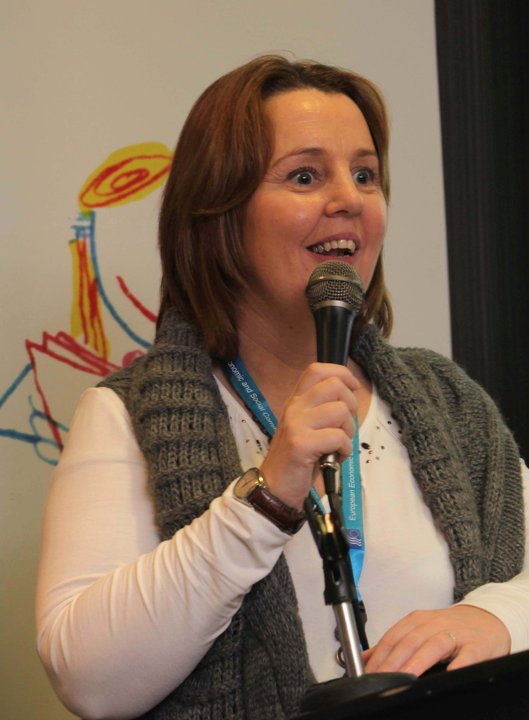
- Van Turnhout in 2011

Senator
- In office 25 May 2011 – 8 June 2016
- Constituency: Nominated by the Taoiseach

Personal details
- Born: Jillian Hassett; 29 March 1968 (age 58) Dublin, Ireland
- Party: Independent
- Spouse: Michael van Turnhout
- Website: jillianvanturnhout.ie

Jillian van Turnhout (née Hassett; born 29 March 1968) is an Irish children's rights advocate and served as an independent member of Seanad Éireann from 2011 to 2016.

== Politics ==
Van Turnhout was nominated by the Taoiseach Enda Kenny to the 24th Seanad in May 2011. She stepped down from her role as Chief Executive of the Children's Rights Alliance, and served as Leader of the Independent Group (Taoiseach Nominees), member of the Oireachtas Joint Committee on Health and Children, and Chair of the Oireachtas Children's Future Health Group until the conclusion of the 24th Seanad in April 2016.

Her areas of focus during her tenure included: initiating the ban on the corporal punishment of children; campaigning against the holding of child beauty pageants in Ireland; developing strategies to tackle online child sexual abuse material (CSAM); children in Direct Provision, transgender children; children in conflict with the law, early childhood education and care; protecting children's health from tobacco smoke; childhood obesity; housing and homelessness; neuro-rehabilitation services and end of life care, in addition to alcohol misuse, alcohol related harm and in her opposition to any alcohol industry involvement in public health campaigns, and education space.

== Europe ==
At a European level, she was elected and employed as Secretary General of the European Coordination Bureau (ECB-BEC) from 1993 to 1996 and was based in Brussels, Belgium. In this role, she was one of the co-founders of the European Youth Forum in 1996. Van Turnhout was appointed by the Government to be a member of the European Economic and Social Committee (EESC) from 1998 to 2011. On each of the four occasions that she was appointed, she was nominated by the Community and Voluntary Pillar on behalf of the NYCI and then the Children's Rights Alliance, where she was involved in Social Affairs, External Relations and Communications.

She represented the EESC on the EU-China Round Table for six years, and on the Steering Group of the EU Forum on the Rights of the Child. Between 2006 and 2008, Van Turnhout was elected to the position of Vice President of the EESC – only the second time in the 50-year history of the organisation that an Irish person was part of the Presidency team.

== Other work ==
Van Turnhout is involved with a number of organisations. She is Chair of Early Childhood Ireland; Chair of Children in Hospital Ireland; Vice Chair of European Movement Ireland; former board member of Women for Election; and former Chief Commissioner of the Irish Girl Guides (IGG). Van Turnhout is a former president of the National Youth Council of Ireland (NYCI); former member of the National Youth Work Advisory Committee; former member of the National Children's Advisory Council; former member of the Management Committee of the National Economic and Social Forum (NESF); and a former Council member of Gaisce – The President's Award.

== Awards ==
She was awarded the 'Freedom of Killarney' in County Kerry in September 2010, and in the same year won the Newstalk Women Mean Business Social Entrepreneur of the Year Award for her innovative work in the Children's Rights Alliance. In 2015, Van Turnhout was awarded TV3's Tonight Show Politician of the Year.

She was also named Senator of the Year by Miriam Lord, writer and columnist with The Irish Times, who said "Van Turnhout's work in the area of child protection puts her in a select band of parliamentarians who aren't living reminders of why the Seanad should have been abolished when we had the chance." In recognition for her work in Europe, Van Turnhout was appointed Honorary President of the Europa Society in University College Cork for 2016–2017.

== Personal life ==
She is married to Michael van Turnhout who works in the private sector and is a member of Fine Gael. He previously served as constituency chairperson for Dublin South and is a former member of their Executive Council.
