= Déirdre de Búrca =

Irish former politician (born 1963)

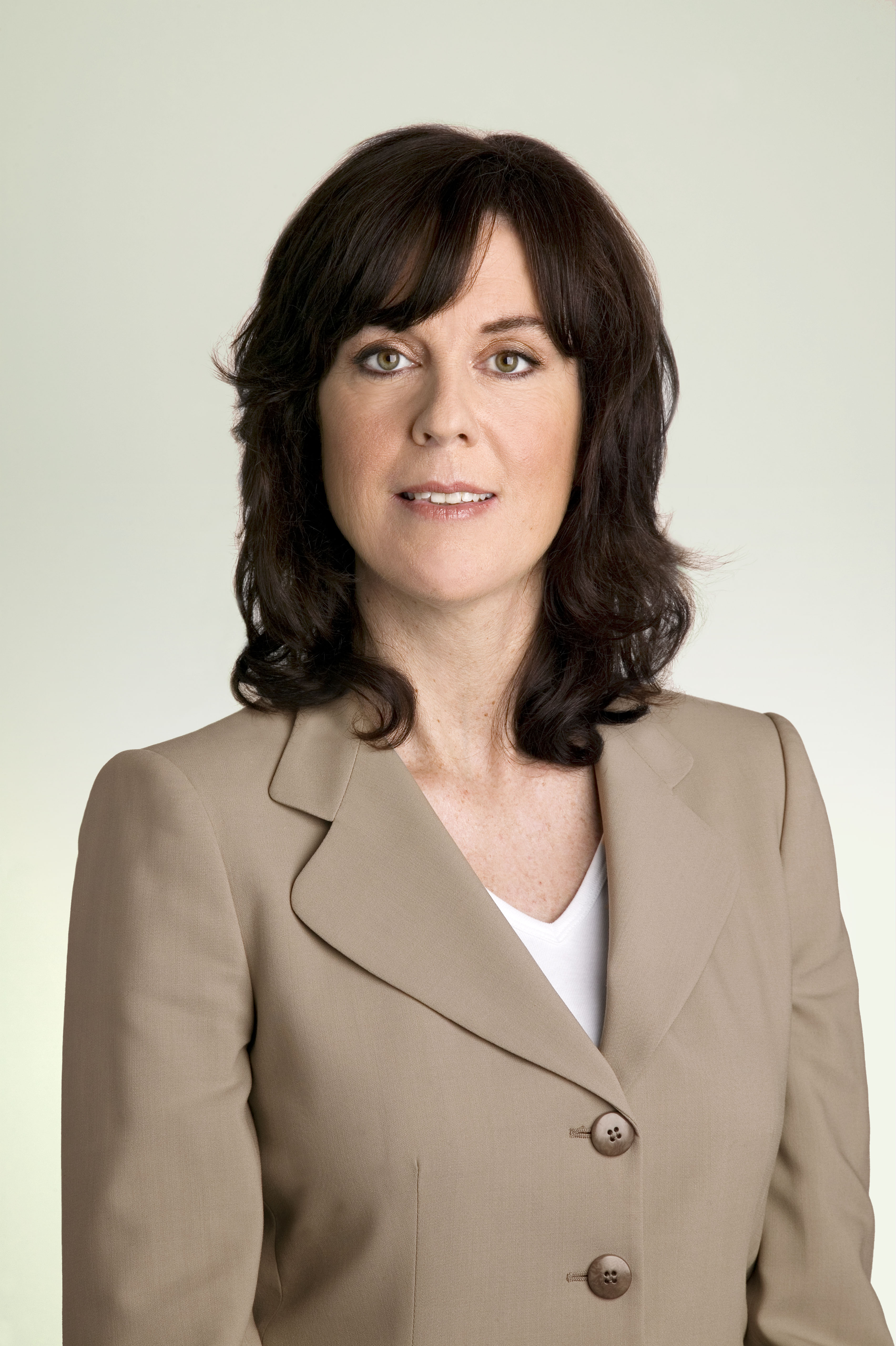
- De Búrca in 2008

Senator
- In office 13 September 2007 – 12 February 2010
- Constituency: Nominated by the Taoiseach

Personal details
- Born: 22 October 1963 (age 62) Cork, Ireland
- Party: Green Party
- Education: Carysfort College; University College Dublin

Déirdre de Búrca (born 22 October 1963) is an Irish former Green Party politician who served as a Senator from 2007 to 2010, after being Nominated by the Taoiseach.

She was a Wicklow County Councillor and a Bray Town Councillor from 1999 to 2007.

== Background ==
Born in Cork, she grew up in Loughlinstown, County Dublin, where she attended Ursuline Convent, Cabinteely (now Cabinteely Community School), and Carysfort College where she qualified as a primary school teacher. She later studied psychology at University College Dublin and worked for Rehab Ireland as a psychologist.

She was a member of Wicklow County Council and Bray Town Council for the Green Party. She was first elected in 1999 for the Bray district, and was returned with an increased vote in 2004, when she was also returned to the Town Council.

De Búrca attracted controversy when it was found she was recording a meeting of Wicklow County Council. She claimed the meetings were being held in an undemocratic fashion, and Councillors were not sufficiently accountable, particularly in relation to planning and rezoning decisions.

She ran for election to Dáil Éireann on two occasions but was not elected: at the 2002 general election for the Wicklow constituency, and also at the 2007 general election in the same constituency.

She unsuccessfully contested the 2009 European Parliament election for the Dublin constituency.

== Senator ==
She was nominated by the Taoiseach Bertie Ahern to Seanad Éireann on 3 August 2007, as part of an agreement made by the Green Party under the Programme for Government. She was also appointed as a member of Joint Oireachtas Committee on European Affairs.

She unsuccessfully contested the 2009 European Parliament as the Green Party candidate for the Dublin constituency. She received 19,086 first preference votes (4.7%) and was eliminated before her former party colleague Patricia McKenna.

== Resignation from the Seanad ==
De Búrca resigned from the Green Party parliamentary party and her seat in the Seanad on 12 February 2010. She stated that she believed "that we have gradually abandoned our political values and our integrity and in many respects have become no more than an extension of Fianna Fáil" and that she had lost confidence in John Gormley as party leader. The Green Party issued a statement stating that they were disappointed by De Búrca's decision but that the party would continue to implement its policies in government. She said that her failure to get a job in the cabinet of Irish European Commissioner Máire Geoghegan-Quinn was a trigger for her resignation from the Seanad but was not the cause of her decision.
