= Tom Fitzgerald (Irish politician) =

Irish politician (1939–2013)

Senator
- In office 17 September 1997 – 4 April 2002
- Constituency: Agricultural Panel
- In office 25 April 1987 – 17 September 1997
- In office 8 October 1981 – 23 February 1983
- Constituency: Agricultural Panel

Personal details
- Born: 25 March 1939; County Kerry, Ireland
- Died: 7 June 2013 (aged 74); County Kerry, Ireland
- Political party: Fianna Fáil

Thomas Fitzgerald (25 March 1939 – 7 June 2013) was an Irish Fianna Fáil politician who served for 13 years in Seanad Éireann.

A native of Lispole, and formerly a fisherman in Dingle, Fitzgerald was a member of Kerry County Council from 1979 to 1985. In 1977 he stood unsuccessfully for the 11th Seanad, but was elected by the Agricultural Panel to the 15th Seanad, and in the February 1982 general election he stood as a candidate in the Kerry South constituency, but failed to win a seat, and did not stand for the Dáil again.

He was then re-elected by the Agricultural Panel, to the 16th Seanad, but was defeated in the 1983 election to the 17th Seanad. He was returned in 1987 to the 18th Seanad, and held his seat at the next two elections before a further defeat in the 1997 election, after which he was nominated by the Taoiseach to the 21st Seanad. He served as the Government's Chief Whip in the Seanad, but resigned from his seat on 4 April 2002, due to ill-health.

A good friend and strong supporter of controversial Fianna Fáil leader Charles Haughey, Fitzgerald cried when Haughey resigned as Taoiseach in 1992.
