= Margaret L. Kennedy =

Irish politician (1892–1953)

Senator
- In office 27 September 1938 – 21 April 1948
- Constituency: Nominated by the Taoiseach

Personal details
- Born: 1892; Dublin, Ireland
- Died: 1953 (aged 60–61); Dublin, Ireland
- Political party: Fianna Fáil

Margaret Loo Agnes Kennedy (1892–1953) was an Irish Fianna Fáil politician. She was an officer in Cumann na mBan, Inghinidhe na hÉireann branch, serving in the Jameson Distillery, Marrowbone Lane, Dublin in 1916, she was made captain in 1920, and later Commandant. Following the Easter Rising she was detained in Kilmainham Gaol and Richmond Barracks. She took the Anti-Treaty side in the Irish Civil War.

She was nominated by the Taoiseach Éamon de Valera to Seanad Éireann in 1938. She was re-appointed in 1943 and 1944 and served until 1948. Kennedy was involved with Association of Old Cumann na mBan.

The daughter of Patrick Kennedy and Mary Kennedy, they lived in Dolphins Barn, South Circular Road, Dublin.
