= Manus Boyle (politician) =

Irish politician

Senator Manus Boyle
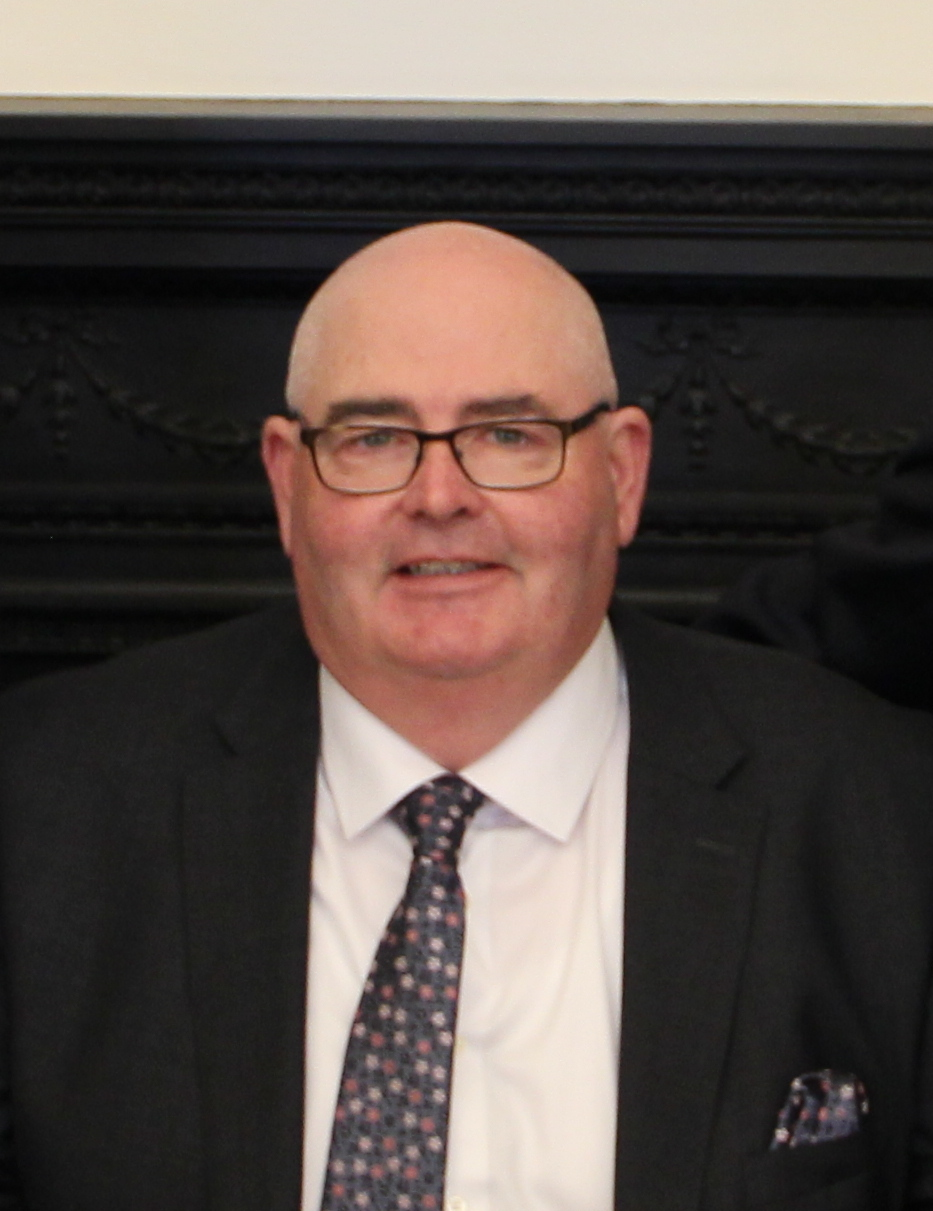
- Boyle in 2025

Senator
- Incumbent
- Assumed office 7 February 2025
- Constituency: Nominated by the Taoiseach

Personal details
- Party: Fine Gael

Manus Boyle is an Irish Fine Gael politician who has been a senator since February 2025 after being nominated by the Taoiseach.

He was a member of Donegal County Council for the Donegal town area from June 2024 to February 2025.
