= Mary Seery Kearney =

Irish politician

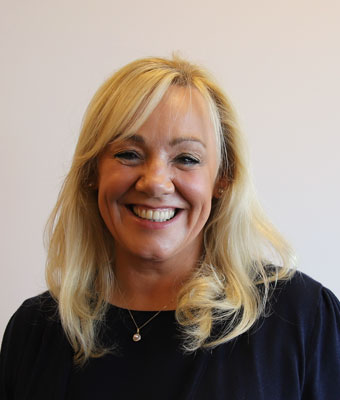

Senator
- In office 29 June 2020 – 30 January 2025
- Constituency: Nominated by the Taoiseach

Personal details
- Born: Mary Seery
- Party: Fine Gael
- Spouse: David Kearney
- Children: 1
- Education: Trinity College Dublin; Open University; King's Inns
- Website: maryseerykearney.ie

Mary Seery Kearney is an Irish Fine Gael politician who served as a Senator from June 2020 to January 2025, after being nominated by the Taoiseach.

== Early life ==
Seery Kearney worked as a barrister, educator and business woman and as chief executive of a housing association.

== Political career ==
Seery Kearney worked as a Fine Gael parliamentary advisor and wrote a number of submissions on behalf of Fine Gael TDs participating in the Constitutional Convention.

Seery Kearney served as a member of South Dublin County Council from 2019 to 2020. She unsuccessfully stood for the Labour Panel at the 2020 Seanad election. She was nominated to the Seanad by Taoiseach Micheál Martin in June 2020. She was the Fine Gael Seanad spokesperson on Children, Disability, Equality, Integration and Youth.

She was an unsuccessful candidate for the Dublin South-Central constituency at the 2024 general election. She unsuccessfully contested the 2025 Seanad election.

== Personal life ==
Seery Kearney lives in Templeogue with her husband David Kearney, and their daughter.
