= Kate Walsh (politician) =

Irish politician (1947–2007)

Senator
- In office 12 September 2002 – 24 April 2007
- Constituency: Nominated by the Taoiseach

Personal details
- Born: 1 March 1947 Celbridge, County Kildare, Ireland
- Died: 24 April 2007 (aged 60) County Kildare, Ireland
- Party: Progressive Democrats
- Other political affiliations: Independent

Kate Walsh (1 March 1947 – 24 April 2007) was an Irish Progressive Democrats politician and community activist from Celbridge, County Kildare. In 2002 she was nominated by the Taoiseach as a member of Seanad Éireann.

Walsh was elected to Kildare County Council at the 1999 local elections, when she stood as an independent and won over one-and-a-half quotas on the first count. She later joined the Progressive Democrats (PDs), and stood unsuccessfully as a PD candidate for Dáil Éireann in the Kildare North at the 2002 general election. She was unsuccessful again at the by-election in 2005. Walsh was Mayor of Celbridge from 1982 to 2007.

She died on 24 April 2007 from complications related to diabetes, after a long illness.
