= Nominated members of Seanad Éireann =

Members of the Irish senate nominated by the taoiseach (prime minister)

Taoiseach's Nominees
- Seanad Éireann constituency

Current constituency
- Created: 1938
- Seats: 11
- Senators: Manus Boyle (FG); Nikki Bradley (FG); Lorraine Clifford-Lee (FF); Alison Comyn (FF); Joe Flaherty (FF); Imelda Goldsboro (FF); Evanne Ní Chuilinn (FG); Noel O'Donovan (FG); Anne Rabbitte (FF); Dee Ryan (FF); Gareth Scahill (FG)

There are 60 seats in Seanad Éireann, the senate of the Oireachtas (the legislature of Ireland). Its composition is set out in Article 18 of the Constitution of Ireland. This provides for 11 senators to be nominated by the Taoiseach who is appointed next after the general election to Dáil Éireann (Ireland's house of representatives).

These nominations allow the government to reach a majority in the Seanad, for smaller parties in coalition or supporting the government to achieve more significant Seanad representation, and for the appointment of Independent members to represent particular interests. Those in the last category have included representatives from Northern Ireland; Billy Lawless, a resident of Chicago, nominated by Enda Kenny in 2016 to represent the interest of the Irish diaspora; and Eileen Flynn, nominated by Micheál Martin in 2020, the first female Traveller to sit in the Oireachtas.

As the outgoing Seanad continues in session after a general election to the Dáil, it is common for the outgoing Taoiseach to appoint Senators to fill the vacancies left by any nominees who were elected to the Dáil for the short period until the conclusion of the Seanad election.

Of the remaining 49 senators, six are elected by university graduates (3 for the National University and 3 for Dublin University), and 43 are elected across 5 vocational panels by Oireachtas members and city and county councillors.

== Senators ==
Senators nominated by the Taoiseach
Key to parties: CnaP = Clann na Poblachta; CnaT = Clann na Talmhan; DL = Democratic Left; FF = Fianna Fáil; FG = Fine Gael; GP = Green; IFF = Independent Fianna Fáil; Lab = Labour; PDs = Progressive Democrats; Ind. = Independent
Sen	Year	Senator (Party)	Senator (Party)	Senator (Party)	Senator (Party)	Senator (Party)	Senator (Party)	Senator (Party)	Senator (Party)	Senator (Party)	Senator (Party)	Senator (Party)
2nd	1938	Robert Farnan (FF)	T. V. Honan (FF)	Margaret L. Kennedy (FF)	Maurice Moore (Note: Maurice Moore died on 8 September 1939.) (FF)	Matthew Stafford (FF)	David Robinson (FF)	Frank MacDermot (FF)	Peadar Mac Fhionnlaoich (Note: Peadar Mac Fhionnlaoich died on 1 July 1942.) (Ind.)	Douglas Hyde (Note: Douglas Hyde was elected as President of Ireland on 4 May 1938.) (Ind.)	John Keane (Ind.)	William Magennis (Note: William Magennis died on 30 March 1946.) (Ind.)
2nd	1938	Robert Farnan (FF)	T. V. Honan (FF)	Margaret L. Kennedy (FF)	Maurice Moore (FF)	Matthew Stafford (FF)	David Robinson (FF)	Frank MacDermot (FF)	Peadar Mac Fhionnlaoich (Ind.)	Patrick Keohane (Note: Patrick Keohane was nominated in place of Douglas Hyde) (Note: Patrick Keohane died on 4 December 1939.) (Ind.)	John Keane (Ind.)	William Magennis (Ind.)
3rd	1938	Robert Farnan (FF)	T. V. Honan (FF)	Margaret L. Kennedy (FF)	Maurice Moore (FF)	Matthew Stafford (FF)	David Robinson (FF)	Frank MacDermot (FF)	Peadar Mac Fhionnlaoich (Ind.)	Patrick Keohane (Ind.)	John Keane (Ind.)	William Magennis (Ind.)
3rd	1939	Robert Farnan (FF)	T. V. Honan (FF)	Margaret L. Kennedy (FF)	Liam Ó Buachalla (FF)	Matthew Stafford (FF)	David Robinson (FF)	Frank MacDermot (FF)	Peadar Mac Fhionnlaoich (Ind.)	Patrick Keohane (Ind.)	John Keane (Ind.)	William Magennis (Ind.)
3rd	1940	Robert Farnan (FF)	T. V. Honan (FF)	Margaret L. Kennedy (FF)	Liam Ó Buachalla (FF)	Matthew Stafford (FF)	David Robinson (FF)	Frank MacDermot (FF)	Peadar Mac Fhionnlaoich (Ind.)	Laurence O'Neill (Ind.)	John Keane (Ind.)	William Magennis (Ind.)
3rd	1942	Robert Farnan (FF)	T. V. Honan (FF)	Margaret L. Kennedy (FF)	Liam Ó Buachalla (FF)	Matthew Stafford (FF)	David Robinson (FF)	Frank MacDermot (FF)	Pádraic Ó Máille (Note: Pádraic Ó Máille died on 19 January 1946.) (FF)	Laurence O'Neill (Ind.)	John Keane (Ind.)	William Magennis (Ind.)
4th	1943	Robert Farnan (FF)	T. V. Honan (FF)	Margaret L. Kennedy (FF)	Liam Ó Buachalla (FF)	Matthew Stafford (FF)	Peter O'Loghlen (FF)	Margaret Mary Pearse (FF)	Pádraic Ó Máille (FF)	Seán Campbell (Lab)	John Keane (Ind.)	William Magennis (Ind.)
5th	1944	Robert Farnan (FF)	T. V. Honan (FF)	Margaret L. Kennedy (FF)	Liam Ó Buachalla (FF)	Matthew Stafford (FF)	Thomas Foran (Lab)	Margaret Mary Pearse (FF)	Pádraic Ó Máille (FF)	Seán Campbell (Lab)	John Keane (Ind.)	William Magennis (Ind.)
5th	1946	Robert Farnan (FF)	T. V. Honan (FF)	Margaret L. Kennedy (FF)	Liam Ó Buachalla (FF)	Matthew Stafford (FF)	Thomas Foran (Lab)	Margaret Mary Pearse (FF)	Edward Pakenham (Ind.)	Seán Campbell (Lab)	John Keane (Ind.)	Pádraig Ó Siochfhradha (Ind.)
6th	1948	George Bennett (FG)	Edmund Sweetman (FG)	Denis Ireland (CnaP)	Patrick McCartan (CnaP)	Eleanor Howard (Lab)	James McCrea (Lab)	James Douglas (Ind.)	Edward McGuire (Ind.)	Séamus O'Farrell (Ind.)	Edward Richards-Orpen (Ind.)	Patrick Woulfe (Ind.)
7th	1951	Robert Farnan (FF)	T. V. Honan (FF)	Daniel Corkery (FF)	Seán Goulding (FF)	Eamon Kissane (FF)	Seán O'Donovan (FF)	Margaret Mary Pearse (FF)	Michael Yeats (FF)	Seán O'Grady (FF)	Joseph Johnston (Ind.)	Pádraig Ó Siochfhradha (Ind.)
8th	1954	Michael Hayes (FG)	Patrick O'Gorman (FG)	James Reidy (FG)	Patrick Bergin (Lab)	James Hickey (Lab)	James Tunney (Lab)	John Meighan (CnaT)	Arthur Cox (Ind.)	James Douglas (Note: James Douglas died on 16 September 1954.) (Ind.)	Henry Guinness (Ind.)	Frank O'Donnell (Ind.)
8th	1954	Michael Hayes (FG)	Patrick O'Gorman (FG)	James Reidy (FG)	Patrick Bergin (Lab)	James Hickey (Lab)	James Tunney (Lab)	John Meighan (CnaT)	Arthur Cox (Ind.)	John Douglas (Ind.)	Henry Guinness (Ind.)	Frank O'Donnell (Ind.)
9th	1957	Robert Farnan (FF)	Seán Brady (FF)	Nora Connolly O'Brien (FF)	Seán Moylan (Note: Seán Moylan died on 16 November 1957.) (FF)	Thomas Mullins (FF)	Seán O'Donovan (FF)	Margaret Mary Pearse (Note: Margaret Mary Pearse died on 7 November 1968.) (FF)	Seán O'Grady (FF)	Pádraig Ó Siochfhradha (Note: Pádraig Ó Siochfhradha died on 19 November 1964.) (Ind.)	John Copeland Cole (Ind.)	Laurence Walsh (FF)
9th	1958	Robert Farnan (FF)	Seán Brady (FF)	Nora Connolly O'Brien (FF)	Louis Walsh (Ind.)	Thomas Mullins (FF)	Seán O'Donovan (FF)	Margaret Mary Pearse (FF)	Seán O'Grady (FF)	Pádraig Ó Siochfhradha (Ind.)	John Copeland Cole (Ind.)	Laurence Walsh (FF)
10th	1961	John J. Brennan (FF)	Gus Healy (FF)	Nora Connolly O'Brien (FF)	Joe Mooney (FF)	Thomas Mullins (FF)	Seán O'Donovan (FF)	Margaret Mary Pearse (FF)	Tom Nolan (FF)	Pádraig Ó Siochfhradha (Ind.)	John Copeland Cole (Ind.)	William Sheldon (Ind.)
10th	1964	John J. Brennan (FF)	Gus Healy (FF)	Nora Connolly O'Brien (FF)	Joe Mooney (FF)	Thomas Mullins (FF)	Seán O'Donovan (FF)	Margaret Mary Pearse (FF)	Tom Nolan (FF)	Kit Ahern (FF)	John Copeland Cole (Ind.)	William Sheldon (Ind.)
11th	1965	Gerald Boland (FF)	Joseph Lenehan (FF)	Nora Connolly O'Brien (FF)	James Ryan (FF)	Thomas Mullins (FF)	Seán O'Donovan (FF)	Margaret Mary Pearse (FF)	Michael Yeats (FF)	Kit Ahern (FF)	John Copeland Cole (Ind.)	William Sheldon (Ind.)
11th	1968	Gerald Boland (FF)	Joseph Lenehan (FF)	Nora Connolly O'Brien (FF)	James Ryan (FF)	Thomas Mullins (FF)	Seán O'Donovan (FF)	Farrell McElgunn (FF)	Michael Yeats (FF)	Kit Ahern (FF)	John Copeland Cole (Ind.)	William Sheldon (Ind.)
12th	1969	John J. Brennan (FF)	Micheál Cranitch (FF)	Brendan Crinion (FF)	Peggy Farrell (FF)	Thomas Mullins (FF)	Michael Gallanagh (FF)	Farrell McElgunn (FF)	Neville Keery (FF)	Terence O'Sullivan (FF)	Thomas Flanagan (Ind.)	William Sheldon (Ind.)
13th	1973	John Blennerhassett (FG)	Austin Deasy (Note: Elected to Dáil Éireann on 16 June 1977.) (FG)	Benjamin Guinness (FG)	Patrick W. McGrath (FG)	Michael J. O'Higgins (FG)	Paddy O'Toole (FG)	James Sanfey (FG)	Brendan Halligan (Note: Brendan Halligan was elected to Dáil Éireann at a by-election on 10 June 1976.) (Lab)	Michael D. Higgins (Lab)	Patrick Kerrigan (Lab)	Michael Mullen (Lab)
13th	1976	John Blennerhassett (FG)	Austin Deasy (FG)	Benjamin Guinness (FG)	Patrick W. McGrath (FG)	Michael J. O'Higgins (FG)	Paddy O'Toole (FG)	James Sanfey (FG)	Ruairi Quinn (Lab)	Michael D. Higgins (Lab)	Patrick Kerrigan (Lab)	Michael Mullen (Lab)
13th	1977	John Blennerhassett (FG)	Liam Burke (FG)	Benjamin Guinness (FG)	Patrick W. McGrath (FG)	Michael J. O'Higgins (FG)	Martin Finn (FG)	James Sanfey (FG)	Brendan Halligan (Lab)	Michael D. Higgins (Lab)	Frank King (Lab)	Michael Mullen (Lab)
14th	1977	Séamus Brennan (Note: Elected to Dáil Éireann on 11 June 1981.) (FF)	Séamus de Brún (FF)	Eileen Cassidy (FF)	Valerie Goulding (FF)	Mary Harney (FF)	Valentine Jago (FF)	Bernard McGlinchey (FF)	Michael Yeats (Note: Michael Yeats resigned on 12 March 1980.) (FF)	Noel Mulcahy (FF)	Gordon Lambert (Ind.)	T. K. Whitaker (Ind.)
14th	1980	Séamus Brennan (FF)	Séamus de Brún (FF)	Eileen Cassidy (FF)	Valerie Goulding (FF)	Mary Harney (FF)	Valentine Jago (FF)	Bernard McGlinchey (FF)	Jim Ruttle (FF)	Noel Mulcahy (FF)	Gordon Lambert (Ind.)	T. K. Whitaker (Ind.)
14th	1981	P. J. Mara (FF)	Séamus de Brún (FF)	Eileen Cassidy (FF)	Valerie Goulding (FF)	Joseph O'Neill (FF)	Valentine Jago (FF)	Bernard McGlinchey (FF)	Jim Ruttle (FF)	Noel Mulcahy (FF)	Gordon Lambert (Ind.)	T. K. Whitaker (Ind.)
15th	1981	Ulick Burke (FG)	Jim Dooge (FG)	Robert Fausset (FG)	Jim Higgins (FG)	Miriam Kearney (FG)	Seán O'Leary (FG)	John F. Carroll (Lab)	Timmy Conway (Lab)	Pat Magner (Lab)	Paddy Dunne (Lab)	T. K. Whitaker (Ind.)
16th	1982	Paudge Brennan (Note: Elected to Dáil Éireann on 24 November 1982.) (FF)	Flor Crowley (FF)	Camilla Hannon (FF)	P. J. Mara (FF)	Bernard McGlinchey (FF)	G. V. Wright (FF)	M. J. Nolan (FF)	Ned O'Keeffe (FF)	James Larkin (IFF)	Seamus Mallon (Ind.)	John Robb (Ind.)
16th	1982	Aidan Eames (FF)	Flor Crowley (FF)	Camilla Hannon (FF)	P. J. Mara (FF)	Bernard McGlinchey (FF)	G. V. Wright (FF)	Seán O'Connor (FF)	Frank Wall (FF)	James Larkin (IFF)	Seamus Mallon (Ind.)	John Robb (Ind.)
17th	1983	John Browne (FG)	John Connor (FG)	Jimmy Deenihan (Note: Elected to Dáil Éireann on 17 February 1987.) (FG)	Patrick Durcan (FG)	Seán O'Leary (FG)	Brendan Howlin (Lab)	Christy Kirwan (Lab)	Pat Magner (Lab)	Stephen McGonagle (Ind.)	Bríd Rodgers (Ind.)	John Robb (Ind.)
17th	1987	John Browne (FG)	John Connor (FG)	Nuala Fennell (FG)	Patrick Durcan (FG)	Seán O'Leary (FG)	Paddy O'Toole (FG)	Christy Kirwan (Lab)	Pat Magner (Lab)	Stephen McGonagle (Ind.)	Bríd Rodgers (Ind.)	John Robb (Ind.)
18th	1987	Séamus Cullimore (Note: Elected to Dáil Éireann on 15 June 1989.) (FF)	Tom McEllistrim (FF)	Jimmy Mulroy (FF)	Vivian O'Callaghan (FF)	John O'Connell (FF)	Nicholas O'Connor (FF)	Éamon de Buitléar (Ind.)	George Eogan (Ind.)	Brian Friel (Ind.)	John Magnier (Ind.)	John Robb (Ind.)
18th	1989	Michael Dawson (FF)	Paul Kavanagh (FF)	Jimmy Mulroy (FF)	Vivian O'Callaghan (FF)	Frank McDonnell (FF)	Nicholas O'Connor (FF)	Éamon de Buitléar (Ind.)	George Eogan (Ind.)	Brian Friel (Ind.)	John Magnier (Ind.)	John Robb (Ind.)
19th	1989	Olga Bennett (FF)	Hugh Byrne (Note: Elected to Dáil Éireann on 25 November 1992.) (FF)	Mick Lanigan (FF)	Tony McKenna (FF)	Denis O'Donovan (FF)	G. V. Wright (Note: Elected to Dáil Éireann on 6 June 1997.) (FF)	Donal Ormonde (FF)	Eoin Ryan (FF)	Martin Cullen (PDs)	John Dardis (PDs)	Helen Keogh (PDs)
19th	1992	Olga Bennett (FF)	Brendan Daly (FF)	Mick Lanigan (FF)	Tony McKenna (FF)	Denis O'Donovan (FF)	G. V. Wright (FF)	Donal Ormonde (FF)	Pat Farrell (FF)	Terry Leyden (FF)	John Dardis (PDs)	Dick Roche (FF)
20th	1993	Seán Byrne (FF)	Brian Crowley (Note: Elected to the European Parliament, resigned from Seanad on 31 August 1994.) (FF)	Brian Hillery (Note: Brian Hillery was appointed to the Board of the European Bank for Reconstruction and Development, resigned from Seanad on 4 May 1994.) (FF)	Billy Kelleher (FF)	Marian McGennis (FF)	G. V. Wright (FF)	Bill Cashin (Lab)	Pat Magner (Lab)	Jim Townsend (Lab)	Jack Wall (Lab)	Gordon Wilson (Note: Gordon Wilson died on 27 June 1995.) (Ind.)
20th	1994	Seán Byrne (FF)	Edward Haughey (FF)	Michael Mulcahy (FF)	Billy Kelleher (FF)	Marian McGennis (FF)	G. V. Wright (FF)	Bill Cashin (Lab)	Pat Magner (Lab)	Jim Townsend (Lab)	Jack Wall (Lab)	Gordon Wilson (Ind.)
20th	1995	Seán Byrne (FF)	Edward Haughey (FF)	Michael Mulcahy (FF)	Billy Kelleher (FF)	Marian McGennis (FF)	G. V. Wright (FF)	Bill Cashin (Lab)	Pat Magner (Lab)	Jim Townsend (Lab)	Jack Wall (Lab)	Brian Hayes (FG)
20th	1997	Seán Byrne (FF)	Edward Haughey (FF)	Michael Mulcahy (FF)	Tom Berkery (FG)	Niamh Cosgrave (FG)	Michael Enright (DL)	Bill Cashin (Lab)	Pat Magner (Lab)	Jim Townsend (Lab)	Niamh Bhreathnach (Lab)	Aidan O'Connor (FG)
21st	1997	Enda Bonner (FF)	Edward Haughey (FF)	Frank Chambers (FF)	Tom Fitzgerald (Note: Tom Fitzgerald resigned from the Seanad on 4 April 2002.) (FF)	Dermot Fitzpatrick (Note: Elected to Dáil Éireann on 17 May 2002.) (FF)	Ann Leonard (FF)	John Dardis (PDs)	Jim Gibbons (PDs)	Helen Keogh (Note: Helen Keogh joined Fine Gael on 14 June 2000.) (PDs)	Máirín Quill (PDs)	Maurice Hayes (Ind.)
21st	2002	Enda Bonner (FF)	Edward Haughey (FF)	Frank Chambers (FF)	Martin Mackin (FF)	Mary O'Rourke (Note: Elected to Dáil Éireann on 24 May 2007.) (FF)	Ann Leonard (FF)	John Dardis (PDs)	Jim Gibbons (PDs)	Helen Keogh (PDs)	Máirín Quill (PDs)	Maurice Hayes (Ind.)
22nd	2002	Cyprian Brady (FF)	Michael Brennan (Note: Michael Brennan joined the Progressive Democrats on 29 April 2004.) (FF)	Brendan Kenneally (FF)	Michael Kitt (FF)	Mary O'Rourke (FF)	Pat Moylan (FF)	John Dardis (PDs)	John Minihan (PDs)	Tom Morrissey (PDs)	Kate Walsh (Note: Kate Walsh died on 24 April 2007.) (PDs)	Maurice Hayes (Ind.)
22nd	2007	Donie Cassidy (FF)	Michael Brennan (FF)	Seán Dorgan (FF)	Peter Sands (FF)	Chris Wall (FF)	Pat Moylan (FF)	John Dardis (PDs)	John Minihan (PDs)	Tom Morrissey (PDs)	Colm O'Gorman (PDs)	Maurice Hayes (Ind.)
23rd	2007	Martin Brady (FF)	Ivor Callely (Note: Ivor Callely resigned the Fianna Fáil whip on 5 June 2010 and resigned from Fianna Fáil on 24 August 2010.) (FF)	Maria Corrigan (FF)	John Ellis (FF)	Brian Ó Domhnaill (FF)	Lisa McDonald (FF)	Ciarán Cannon (Note: Ciarán Cannon joined Fine Gael on 24 March 2009; elected to Dáil Éireann on 25 February 2011.) (PDs)	Fiona O'Malley (Note: Fiona O'Malley sat as an Independent from dissolution of the Progressive Democrats in December 2009.) (PDs)	Dan Boyle (GP)	Déirdre de Búrca (Note: Déirdre de Búrca resigned on 12 February 2010.) (GP)	Eoghan Harris (Ind.)
23rd	2010	Martin Brady (FF)	Ivor Callely (FF)	Maria Corrigan (FF)	John Ellis (FF)	Brian Ó Domhnaill (FF)	Lisa McDonald (FF)	Ciarán Cannon (PDs)	Fiona O'Malley (PDs)	Dan Boyle (GP)	Mark Dearey (GP)	Eoghan Harris (Ind.)
23rd	2011	Martin Brady (FF)	Ivor Callely (FF)	Maria Corrigan (FF)	John Ellis (FF)	Brian Ó Domhnaill (FF)	Lisa McDonald (FF)	Darragh O'Brien (Note: Darragh O'Brien was nominated to seat vacated by Ciarán Cannon.) (FF)	Fiona O'Malley (PDs)	Dan Boyle (GP)	Mark Dearey (GP)	Eoghan Harris (Ind.)
24th	2011	Eamonn Coghlan (Note: Eamonn Coghlan took the Fine Gael whip on 7 February 2012.) (Ind.)	Jim D'Arcy (FG)	Aideen Hayden (Lab)	Lorraine Higgins (Lab)	Fiach Mac Conghail (Ind.)	Martin McAleese (Note: Martin McAleese resigned on 4 February 2013.) (Ind.)	Mary Moran (Lab)	Mary Ann O'Brien (Ind.)	Marie-Louise O'Donnell (Ind.)	Jillian van Turnhout (Ind.)	Katherine Zappone (Note: Katherine Zappone was elected to Dáil Éireann on 26 February 2016.) (Ind.)
24th	2013	Eamonn Coghlan (Ind.)	Jim D'Arcy (FG)	Aideen Hayden (Lab)	Lorraine Higgins (Lab)	Fiach Mac Conghail (Ind.)	Hildegarde Naughton (Note: Hildegarde Naughton was nominated on 19 July 2013 to fill vacancy left by Martin McAleese.) (FG)	Mary Moran (Lab)	Mary Ann O'Brien (Ind.)	Marie-Louise O'Donnell (Ind.)	Jillian van Turnhout (Ind.)	Katherine Zappone (Ind.)
25th	2016	Ray Butler (FG)	Paudie Coffey (FG)	Frank Feighan (Note: Frank Feighan was elected to Dáil Éireann on 8 February 2020.) (FG)	Joan Freeman (Ind.)	Colette Kelleher (Ind.)	Billy Lawless (Ind.)	Michelle Mulherin (FG)	Pádraig Ó Céidigh (Ind.)	Marie-Louise O'Donnell (Ind.)	John O'Mahony (FG)	James Reilly (FG)
25th	2020	Ray Butler (FG)	Paudie Coffey (FG)	Seán Kyne (Note: Seán Kyne was nominated to the seat vacated by Frank Feighan.) (FG)	Joan Freeman (Ind.)	Colette Kelleher (Ind.)	Billy Lawless (Ind.)	Michelle Mulherin (FG)	Pádraig Ó Céidigh (Ind.)	Marie-Louise O'Donnell (Ind.)	John O'Mahony (FG)	James Reilly (FG)
26th	2020	Timmy Dooley (Note: Elected to Dáil Éireann on 29 November 2024.) (FF)	Erin McGreehan (FF)	Mary Fitzpatrick (FF)	Lorraine Clifford-Lee (FF)	Eileen Flynn (Ind.)	Róisín Garvey (GP)	Vincent P. Martin (GP)	Mary Seery Kearney (FG)	Aisling Dolan (FG)	Regina Doherty (Note: Regina Doherty resigned following her election to the European Parliament.) (FG)	Emer Currie (FG)
26th	2024	Anne Rabbitte (Note: Nominated to fill a vacancy on 10 December 2024, following the 2024 general election.) (FF)	Joe Flaherty (FF)	Mary Fitzpatrick (FF)	Lorraine Clifford-Lee (FF)	Eileen Flynn (Ind.)	Róisín Garvey (GP)	Vincent P. Martin (GP)	Mary Seery Kearney (FG)	Aisling Dolan (FG)	Nikki Bradley (FG)	Alan Farrell (FG)
27th	2025	Anne Rabbitte (FF)	Joe Flaherty (FF)	Dee Ryan (FF)	Lorraine Clifford-Lee (FF)	Alison Comyn (FF)	Imelda Goldsboro (FF)	Manus Boyle (FG)	Noel O'Donovan (FG)	Gareth Scahill (FG)	Nikki Bradley (FG)	Evanne Ní Chuilinn (FG)

== See also ==
- Category:Nominated members of Seanad Éireann
