= Ann Gallagher =

Irish politician (born 1967)

Senator
- In office 17 February 1993 – 17 September 1997
- Constituency: Industrial and Commercial Panel

Personal details
- Born: 2 March 1967 (age 59) County Leitrim, Ireland
- Party: Social Democrats
- Other political affiliations: Labour Party
- Education: Trinity College Dublin

Ann Gallagher (born 2 March 1967) is a Social Democrat politician from County Leitrim in Ireland. She was formerly a member of the Labour Party and was a senator from 1993 to 1997. She obtained an honours law degree from Trinity College Dublin and is a solicitor by profession.

== Political career ==
Gallagher stood as a Labour candidate for Dáil Éireann in the Cavan–Monaghan constituency at the 1992 general election and nearly won a seat, coming 6th in a five-seater constituency. In the subsequent elections to Seanad Éireann, she topped the poll and was elected on the Industrial and Commercial Panel. She served as a Senator from 1993 to 1997. She was a member of the Northern Ireland Forum for Peace and Reconciliation. She was a member of the Joint Oireachtas Committee on Women's Rights and the Joint Oireachtas Committee on Foreign Affairs. She was also appointed to the Oireachtas Committee to Review the Constitution. She was the party's Spokesperson for Justice, Equality and Law Reform.

At the 1994 European Parliament election she stood unsuccessfully in the Connacht–Ulster constituency but achieved the highest percentage vote for any Labour Party candidate to date, and after a further defeat in the 1997 general election, she did not stand in the 1997 elections to the 21st Seanad. She continued her career as a solicitor but also qualified as a barrister.

In August 2021, it was announced that she would become the interim general secretary of the Social Democrats.
