= Deirdre Bolger =

Irish politician (born 1938)

Senator
- In office 8 October 1981 – 23 February 1983
- Constituency: Industrial and Commercial Panel

Personal details
- Born: 27 July 1938 (age 87) County Wexford, Ireland
- Party: Fine Gael

Deirdre Bolger (born 27 July 1938) is a former Irish Fine Gael politician. She was elected to Seanad Éireann on the Industrial and Commercial Panel in 1981 and was re-elected in 1982. In the 1985 local elections, she was elected to Wexford County Council for the Gorey area and served until 2004.
