= Pat Magner =

Irish politician (1941–2023)

Senator
- In office 17 February 1993 – 17 September 1997
- In office 23 February 1983 – 25 April 1987
- In office 8 October 1981 – 13 May 1982
- Constituency: Nominated by the Taoiseach

Personal details
- Born: 25 March 1941 Cork, Ireland
- Died: 10 April 2023 (aged 82) Cork, Ireland
- Party: Labour Party
- Spouse: Anne Magner
- Children: 8

Patrick Magner (25 March 1941 – 10 April 2023) was an Irish Labour Party politician from Cork. A long-serving Labour Party official, he was appointed as a Senator on three occasions.

Magner died on 10 April 2023, at the age of 82.
