= Miriam Kearney =

Irish politician (born 1959)

Senator
- In office 8 October 1981 – 13 May 1982
- Constituency: Nominated by the Taoiseach

Personal details
- Born: 20 July 1959 (age 67) Cork, Ireland
- Party: Fine Gael
- Education: University College Cork

Miriam Kearney (born 20 July 1959) is an Irish former Fine Gael politician who served as a Senator from 1981 to 1982, after being nominated by the Taoiseach Garret FitzGerald.

She held the record as the youngest member of Seanad Éireann, being 22 years old on appointment.

A graduate of University College Cork, Kearney was at the time a member of Young Fine Gael and chairperson of its International Affairs Committee.

In 1981, she supported the abolition of jury trials in accident compensation cases. She also voted for the abolition of the death penalty.

She was in charge of the Taoiseach's itinerary and managed his campaign tour during the February 1982 election.

She stood for the Industrial and Commercial Panel at the February 1982 Seanad election but was not elected. She later became Assistant General Secretary of Fine Gael.
