= 11th Seanad =

Members of the Seanad from 1965 to 1969

←	10th Seanad	12th Seanad	→

Overview
- Legislative body: Seanad Éireann
- Jurisdiction: Ireland
- Meeting place: Leinster House
- Term: 23 June 1965 – 24 July 1969
- Government: 11th Government of Ireland (1965–1966); 12th Government of Ireland (1966–1969)
- Members: 60
- Cathaoirleach: Liam Ó Buachalla (FF)
- Leas-Chathaoirleach: James Dooge (FG)
- Leader of the Seanad: Thomas Mullins (FF)

The 11th Seanad was in office from 1965 to 1969. An election to Seanad Éireann, the Senate of the Oireachtas (Irish parliament), followed the 1965 general election to the 18th Dáil. The senators served until the close of poll for the 12th Seanad in 1969.

== Cathaoirleach ==
On 23 June 1965, Liam Ó Buachalla (FF), the outgoing Cathaoirleach, was proposed again for the position by Thomas Mullins (FF) and seconded by Kit Ahern (FF). He was elected unopposed.

On 30 June 1965, in the election for the position of Leas-Chathaoirleach, James Dooge (FG) was proposed by Ben O'Quigley (FG) and seconded by Denis J. O'Sullivan (FG). Timothy McAuliffe (Lab) was proposed by Jack Fitzgerald (Lab) and seconded by Patrick Crowley. Dooge was elected by a vote of 18 to 6, with Fianna Fáil abstaining.

== Composition of the 11th Seanad ==
There are a total of 60 seats in the Seanad: 43 were elected on five vocational panels, 6 were elected from two university constituencies and 11 were nominated by the Taoiseach.

The following table shows the composition by party when the 11th Seanad first met on 23 June 1965.

Origin Party	Vocational panels					NUI	DU	Nominated	Total
Origin Party	Admin	Agri	Cult & Educ	Ind & Comm	Labour	NUI	DU	Nominated	Total
Fianna Fáil	3	5	3	4	5	0	0	9	29
Fine Gael	2	4	1	3	3	0	0	0	13
Labour Party	1	1	1	1	2	0	0	0	6
Independent	1	1	0	1	1	3	3	2	12
Total	7	11	5	9	11	3	3	11	60

== List of senators ==
- Note: The entries for Senators who were elected or appointed to fill vacancies are shown in italics

Name	Panel	Party	Notes
Liam Ahern	Administrative Panel	Fianna Fáil	
Kieran Egan	Administrative Panel	Fianna Fáil	
Patrick Fitzsimons	Administrative Panel	Independent	
Jack McQuillan	Administrative Panel	Labour	Lost Labour whip in 1968
Patrick O'Reilly	Administrative Panel	Fine Gael	Elected to the 19th Dáil at the general election on 18 June 1969
Éamon Rooney	Administrative Panel	Fine Gael	
Patrick Teehan	Administrative Panel	Fianna Fáil	
Jack Fitzgerald	Agricultural Panel	Labour	
Patrick Malone	Agricultural Panel	Fine Gael	
John Mannion	Agricultural Panel	Fine Gael	
James Martin	Agricultural Panel	Fianna Fáil	
Charles McDonald	Agricultural Panel	Fine Gael	
Patrick McGowan	Agricultural Panel	Fianna Fáil	
Patrick O'Reilly	Agricultural Panel	Fianna Fáil	
Timothy O'Sullivan	Agricultural Panel	Fianna Fáil	
Micheál Prendergast	Agricultural Panel	Fine Gael	
Patrick W. Ryan	Agricultural Panel	Independent	
William Ryan	Agricultural Panel	Fianna Fáil	
Timothy McAuliffe	Cultural and Educational Panel	Labour	
John J. Nash	Cultural and Educational Panel	Fianna Fáil	
Liam Ó Buachalla	Cultural and Educational Panel	Fianna Fáil	Cathaoirleach
Michael O'Kennedy	Cultural and Educational Panel	Fianna Fáil	Elected to the 19th Dáil at the general election on 18 June 1969
Ben O'Quigley	Cultural and Educational Panel	Fine Gael	Died on 29 May 1969
John J. Brennan	Industrial and Commercial Panel	Fianna Fáil	
John Conlan	Industrial and Commercial Panel	Fine Gael	Elected to the 19th Dáil at the general election on 18 June 1969
Mary Davidson	Industrial and Commercial Panel	Labour	
Garret FitzGerald	Industrial and Commercial Panel	Fine Gael	Elected to the 19th Dáil at the general election on 18 June 1969
Thomas Flanagan	Industrial and Commercial Panel	Independent	
Dermot Honan	Industrial and Commercial Panel	Fianna Fáil	
Bernard McGlinchey	Industrial and Commercial Panel	Fianna Fáil	
Denis J. O'Sullivan	Industrial and Commercial Panel	Fine Gael	
Eoin Ryan	Industrial and Commercial Panel	Fianna Fáil	
Seán Brosnahan	Labour Panel	Independent	
Seán Browne	Labour Panel	Fianna Fáil	Elected to the 19th Dáil at the general election on 18 June 1969
Victor Carton	Labour Panel	Fine Gael	
Patrick Crowley	Labour Panel	Labour	
Séamus Dolan	Labour Panel	Fianna Fáil	
James Dooge	Labour Panel	Fine Gael	
Joseph Farrell	Labour Panel	Fianna Fáil	
Mark Killilea	Labour Panel	Fianna Fáil	
Vincent McHugh	Labour Panel	Fine Gael	
Dominick Murphy	Labour Panel	Labour	
John Ormonde	Labour Panel	Fianna Fáil	
Bryan Alton	National University of Ireland	Independent	
Dónall Ó Conalláin	National University of Ireland	Independent	
Patrick Quinlan	National University of Ireland	Independent	
William J. E. Jessop	Dublin University	Independent	
Owen Sheehy-Skeffington	Dublin University	Independent	
William Bedell Stanford	Dublin University	Independent	
Kit Ahern	Nominated by the Taoiseach	Fianna Fáil	
Gerald Boland	Nominated by the Taoiseach	Fianna Fáil	
John Copeland Cole	Nominated by the Taoiseach	Independent	
Joseph Lenehan	Nominated by the Taoiseach	Fianna Fáil	Elected to the 19th Dáil at the general election on 18 June 1969
Farrell McElgunn	Nominated by the Taoiseach	Fianna Fáil	Nominated on 21 November 1968, replacing Margaret Mary Pearse
Thomas Mullins	Nominated by the Taoiseach	Fianna Fáil	Leader of the Seanad
Nora Connolly O'Brien	Nominated by the Taoiseach	Independent	
Seán O'Donovan	Nominated by the Taoiseach	Fianna Fáil	
Margaret Mary Pearse	Nominated by the Taoiseach	Fianna Fáil	Died on 7 November 1968
James Ryan	Nominated by the Taoiseach	Fianna Fáil	
William Sheldon	Nominated by the Taoiseach	Independent	
Michael Yeats	Nominated by the Taoiseach	Fianna Fáil	

== Changes ==
Date	Panel	Loss	Gain	Note
April 1968	Administrative Panel	Labour	Independent	Jack McQuillan lost the Labour whip
7 November 1968	Nominated by the Taoiseach	Fianna Fáil		Death of Margaret Mary Pearse
21 November 1968	Nominated by the Taoiseach		Fianna Fáil	Farrell McElgunn nominated to replace Margaret Mary Pearse
29 May 1969	Cultural and Educational Panel	Fine Gael		Death of Ben O'Quigley
18 June 1969	Administrative Panel	Fine Gael		Patrick O'Reilly elected to Dáil Éireann at the 1969 general election
18 June 1969	Cultural and Educational Panel	Fianna Fáil		Michael O'Kennedy elected to Dáil Éireann at the 1969 general election
18 June 1969	Industrial and Commercial Panel	Fine Gael		John Conlan elected to Dáil Éireann at the 1969 general election
18 June 1969	Labour Panel	Fianna Fáil		Seán Browne elected to Dáil Éireann at the 1969 general election
18 June 1969	Nominated by the Taoiseach	Fianna Fáil		Joseph Lenehan elected to Dáil Éireann at the 1969 general election
