= 10th Seanad =

Members of the Seanad from 1961 to 1965

| ← | 9th Seanad | 11th Seanad | → |

Overview
- Legislative body: Seanad Éireann
- Jurisdiction: Ireland
- Meeting place: Leinster House
- Term: 14 December 1961 – 28 July 1965
- Government: 10th government of Ireland
- Members: 60
- Cathaoirleach: Liam Ó Buachalla (FF)
- Leas-Chathaoirleach: Patrick Lindsay (FG)
- Leader of the Seanad: Thomas Mullins (FF)

The 10th Seanad was in office from 1961 to 1965. An election to Seanad Éireann, the senate of the Oireachtas (Irish parliament), followed the 1961 general election to the 19th Dáil. The senators served until the close of the poll for the 11th Seanad in 1965.

== Cathaoirleach ==
On 14 December 1961, Liam Ó Buachalla (FF), the outgoing Cathaoirleach, was proposed again for the position by Thomas Mullins (FF) and seconded by Eamon Kissane (FF). He was elected unopposed.

On 3 January 1962, in the election for the position of Leas-Chathaoirleach, Patrick Lindsay was proposed by Michael Hayes (FG) and seconded by Edward McGuire (Ind). Mary Davidson (Lab) was proposed by Dominick Murphy and seconded by Patrick Crowley. Lindsay was elected by a vote of 19 to 7, with Fianna Fáil abstaining.

== Composition of the 10th Seanad ==
There are a total of 60 seats in the Seanad: 43 were elected on five vocational panels, 6 were elected from two university constituencies and 11 were nominated by the Taoiseach.

The following table shows the composition by party when the 10th Seanad first met on 14 December 1961.

| Origin Party | Vocational panels | | | | | NUI | DU | Nominated | Total |
| Origin Party | Admin | Agri | Cult & Educ | Ind & Comm | Labour | NUI | DU | Nominated | Total |
|---|---|---|---|---|---|---|---|---|---|
| Fianna Fáil | 3 | 5 | 3 | 4 | 5 | 0 | 0 | 8 | 28 |
| Fine Gael | 2 | 3 | 1 | 2 | 3 | 0 | 0 | 0 | 11 |
| Labour Party | 1 | 1 | 1 | 1 | 2 | 0 | 0 | 0 | 6 |
| Independent | 1 | 2 | 0 | 2 | 1 | 3 | 3 | 3 | 15 |
| Total | 7 | 11 | 5 | 9 | 11 | 3 | 3 | 11 | 60 |

== List of senators ==
- Note: The entries for Senators who were elected or appointed to fill vacancies are shown in italics

| Name | Panel | Party | Notes |
|---|---|---|---|
| Liam Ahern | Administrative Panel | Fianna Fáil | |
| Seán Brady | Administrative Panel | Fianna Fáil | |
| Cornelius Desmond | Administrative Panel | Labour | |
| Thomas J. Fitzpatrick | Administrative Panel | Fine Gael | |
| Patrick Fitzsimons | Administrative Panel | Independent | |
| Gerry L'Estrange | Administrative Panel | Fine Gael | |
| Thomas Ruane | Administrative Panel | Fianna Fáil | |
| Batt Donegan | Agricultural Panel | Fianna Fáil | Elected to Seanad at a by-election on 28 November 1963, succeeding John Donnelly Sheridan |
| Jack Fitzgerald | Agricultural Panel | Labour | |
| Daniel Hogan | Agricultural Panel | Fianna Fáil | |
| Robert Lahiffe | Agricultural Panel | Fianna Fáil | |
| John Mannion | Agricultural Panel | Fine Gael | |
| Charles McDonald | Agricultural Panel | Fine Gael | |
| Patrick O'Reilly | Agricultural Panel | Fianna Fáil | |
| Timothy O'Sullivan | Agricultural Panel | Fianna Fáil | |
| Micheál Prendergast | Agricultural Panel | Fine Gael | |
| Patrick W. Ryan | Agricultural Panel | Independent | |
| William Ryan | Agricultural Panel | Fianna Fáil | |
| John Donnelly Sheridan | Agricultural Panel | Independent | Died on 5 April 1963 |
| Michael Hayes | Cultural and Educational Panel | Fine Gael | |
| Eamon Kissane | Cultural and Educational Panel | Fianna Fáil | |
| Timothy McAuliffe | Cultural and Educational Panel | Labour | |
| John J. Nash | Cultural and Educational Panel | Fianna Fáil | |
| Liam Ó Buachalla | Cultural and Educational Panel | Fianna Fáil | Cathaoirleach |
| Gerald Boland | Industrial and Commercial Panel | Fianna Fáil | |
| John Costelloe | Industrial and Commercial Panel | Fianna Fáil | Elected to Seanad at a by-election on 28 November 1963, succeeding Daniel Moloney |
| Mary Davidson | Industrial and Commercial Panel | Labour | |
| Thomas Flanagan | Industrial and Commercial Panel | Independent | |
| Patrick Lindsay | Industrial and Commercial Panel | Fine Gael | |
| Bernard McGlinchey | Industrial and Commercial Panel | Fianna Fáil | |
| Edward McGuire | Industrial and Commercial Panel | Independent | |
| Daniel Moloney | Industrial and Commercial Panel | Fianna Fáil | Died on 26 June 1963 |
| Joseph Quigley | Industrial and Commercial Panel | Fine Gael | |
| Eoin Ryan | Industrial and Commercial Panel | Fianna Fáil | |
| Seán Brosnahan | Labour Panel | Independent | |
| Seán Browne | Labour Panel | Fianna Fáil | |
| John Butler | Labour Panel | Fine Gael | |
| Victor Carton | Labour Panel | Fine Gael | |
| Patrick Crowley | Labour Panel | Labour | |
| James Dooge | Labour Panel | Fine Gael | |
| Joseph Farrell | Labour Panel | Fianna Fáil | |
| Seán Hayes | Labour Panel | Fianna Fáil | |
| Mark Killilea | Labour Panel | Fianna Fáil | |
| Dominick Murphy | Labour Panel | Labour | |
| Michael Yeats | Labour Panel | Fianna Fáil | |
| Dónall Ó Conalláin | National University of Ireland | Independent | |
| George O'Brien | National University of Ireland | Independent | |
| Patrick Quinlan | National University of Ireland | Independent | |
| William J. E. Jessop | Dublin University | Independent | |
| John N. Ross | Dublin University | Independent | |
| William Bedell Stanford | Dublin University | Independent | |
| Kit Ahern | Nominated by the Taoiseach | Fianna Fáil | Nominated on 25 November 1964 succeeding Pádraig Ó Siochfhradha |
| John J. Brennan | Nominated by the Taoiseach | Fianna Fáil | |
| John Copeland Cole | Nominated by the Taoiseach | Independent | |
| Gus Healy | Nominated by the Taoiseach | Fianna Fáil | |
| Joe Mooney | Nominated by the Taoiseach | Fianna Fáil | |
| Thomas Mullins | Nominated by the Taoiseach | Fianna Fáil | |
| Tom Nolan | Nominated by the Taoiseach | Fianna Fáil | |
| Nora Connolly O'Brien | Nominated by the Taoiseach | Independent | |
| Seán O'Donovan | Nominated by the Taoiseach | Fianna Fáil | |
| Pádraig Ó Siochfhradha | Nominated by the Taoiseach | Independent | Died on 19 November 1964 |
| Margaret Mary Pearse | Nominated by the Taoiseach | Fianna Fáil | |
| William Sheldon | Nominated by the Taoiseach | Independent | |

== Changes ==
| Date | Panel | Loss | Gain | Note |
|---|---|---|---|---|
| 5 April 1963 | Agricultural Panel | Independent | | Death of John Donnelly Sheridan |
| 26 June 1963 | Industrial and Commercial Panel | Fianna Fáil | | Death of Daniel Moloney |
| 28 November 1963 | Agricultural Panel | | Fianna Fáil | Batt Donegan elected at a by-election to succeed John Donnelly Sheridan |
| 28 November 1963 | Industrial and Commercial Panel | | Fianna Fáil | John Costelloe elected at a by-election to succeed Daniel Moloney |
| 19 November 1964 | Nominated by the Taoiseach | Independent | | Death of Pádraig Ó Siochfhradha |
| 25 November 1964 | Nominated by the Taoiseach | | Fianna Fáil | Kit Ahern nominated to succeed Pádraig Ó Siochfhradha |
