= 12th Seanad =

Members of the Seanad from 1969 to 1973

←	11th Seanad	13th Seanad	→

Overview
- Legislative body: Seanad Éireann
- Jurisdiction: Ireland
- Meeting place: Leinster House
- Term: 5 November 1969 – 30 March 1973
- Government: 13th government of Ireland
- Members: 60
- Cathaoirleach: Michael Yeats (FF) (1969–1973); Micheál Cranitch (FF) (1973)
- Leas-Chathaoirleach: James Dooge (FG)
- Leader of the Seanad: Thomas Mullins (FF)

The 12th Seanad was in office from 1969 to 1973. An election to Seanad Éireann, the Senate of the Oireachtas (Irish parliament), followed the 1969 general election to the 19th Dáil. The senators served until the close of poll for the 13th Seanad in 1973.

== Cathaoirleach ==
On 5 November 1969, Michael Yeats (FF) was proposed for the position of Cathaoirleach by Thomas Mullins (FF) and seconded by John J. Nash (FF). He was elected with Mary Robinson (Ind) and Owen Sheehy-Skeffington (Ind) dissenting.

On 12 November 1969, James Dooge (FG) was proposed for the position of Leas-Chathaoirleach by Michael O'Higgins (FG) and seconded by Charles McDonald (FG). He was elected unopposed.

On 1 January 1973, Yeats resigned as Cathaoirleach on his appointment as a member of the Irish delegation in the European Parliament. On 1 January 1973, in the election of a new Cathaoirleach, Micheál Cranitch (FF) was proposed Thomas Mullins (FF) and seconded by Kit Ahern (FF). James Dooge was proposed by Michael O'Higgins (FG) and seconded by Charles McDonald (FG). Cranitch was elected by a vote of 28 to 14.

== Composition of the 12th Seanad ==
There are a total of 60 seats in the Seanad: 43 were elected on five vocational panels, 6 were elected from two university constituencies and 11 were nominated by the Taoiseach.

The following table shows the composition by party when the 12th Seanad first met on 5 November 1969.

Origin Party	Vocational panels					NUI	DU	Nominated	Total
Origin Party	Admin	Agri	Cult & Educ	Ind & Comm	Labour	NUI	DU	Nominated	Total
Fianna Fáil	3	4	3	4	4	0	0	9	27
Fine Gael	3	5	2	3	3	0	0	0	16
Labour Party	0	1	0	1	3	1	0	0	6
Independent	1	1	0	1	1	2	3	2	11
Total	7	11	5	9	11	3	3	11	60

== List of senators ==
- Note: The entries for Senators who were elected or appointed to fill vacancies are shown in italics

Name	Panel	Party	Notes
Liam Ahern	Administrative Panel	Fianna Fáil	Elected to the 20th Dáil at the general election on 28 February 1973
Richard Belton	Administrative Panel	Fine Gael	
Patrick Fitzsimons	Administrative Panel	Independent	
Jack Garrett	Administrative Panel	Fianna Fáil	
Patrick Malone	Administrative Panel	Fine Gael	Elected to the 19th Dáil at a by-election on 14 April 1970
Patrick Norton	Administrative Panel	Fianna Fáil	
Patrick J. Reynolds	Administrative Panel	Fine Gael	Elected to the 20th Dáil at the general election on 28 February 1973
Seán Keegan	Administrative Panel	Fianna Fáil	Elected to Seanad at a by-election on 16 June 1970, replacing Patrick Malone
Pierce Butler	Agricultural Panel	Fine Gael	
John Doyle	Agricultural Panel	Fianna Fáil	
Jack Fitzgerald	Agricultural Panel	Labour	
John Mannion	Agricultural Panel	Fine Gael	
James Martin	Agricultural Panel	Fianna Fáil	Died on 3 October 1969
Charles McDonald	Agricultural Panel	Fine Gael	Elected to the 20th Dáil at the general election on 28 February 1973
Patrick McGowan	Agricultural Panel	Fianna Fáil	
Andy O'Brien	Agricultural Panel	Fine Gael	
Micheál Prendergast	Agricultural Panel	Fine Gael	
Patrick W. Ryan	Agricultural Panel	Independent	
William Ryan	Agricultural Panel	Fianna Fáil	
Cornelius O'Callaghan	Agricultural Panel	Fianna Fáil	Elected to Seanad at a by-election on 24 February 1970, replacing James Martin
Kit Ahern	Cultural and Educational Panel	Fianna Fáil	
John Kelly	Cultural and Educational Panel	Fine Gael	Elected to the 20th Dáil at the general election on 28 February 1973
John J. Nash	Cultural and Educational Panel	Fianna Fáil	
Michael O'Higgins	Cultural and Educational Panel	Fine Gael	
Michael Yeats	Cultural and Educational Panel	Fianna Fáil	
Ruairí Brugha	Industrial and Commercial Panel	Fianna Fáil	Elected to the 20th Dáil at the general election on 28 February 1973
Eileen Desmond	Industrial and Commercial Panel	Labour	Elected to the 20th Dáil at the general election on 28 February 1973
James Dooge	Industrial and Commercial Panel	Fine Gael	
Denis Farrelly	Industrial and Commercial Panel	Fine Gael	
Alexis FitzGerald	Industrial and Commercial Panel	Fine Gael	
Dermot Honan	Industrial and Commercial Panel	Fianna Fáil	
Bernard McGlinchey	Industrial and Commercial Panel	Fianna Fáil	
Ted Russell	Industrial and Commercial Panel	Independent	
Eoin Ryan	Industrial and Commercial Panel	Fianna Fáil	
John Boland	Labour Panel	Fine Gael	
Seán Brosnahan	Labour Panel	Independent	
Jimmy Dunne	Labour Panel	Labour	Died on 23 February 1972
Joseph Farrell	Labour Panel	Fianna Fáil	Elected to the 20th Dáil at the general election on 28 February 1973
Des Hanafin	Labour Panel	Fianna Fáil	
Fintan Kennedy	Labour Panel	Labour	
Mark Killilea	Labour Panel	Fianna Fáil	
Michael Lyons	Labour Panel	Fine Gael	
William O'Brien	Labour Panel	Fine Gael	
Evelyn Owens	Labour Panel	Labour	
Seán Walsh	Labour Panel	Fianna Fáil	Elected to the 20th Dáil at the general election on 28 February 1973
Bryan Alton	National University of Ireland	Independent	
John Horgan	National University of Ireland	Labour	
Patrick Quinlan	National University of Ireland	Independent	
William J. E. Jessop	Dublin University	Independent	
Mary Bourke	Dublin University	Independent	
Owen Sheehy-Skeffington	Dublin University	Independent	Died on 7 June 1970
Trevor West	Dublin University	Independent	Elected to Seanad at a by-election on 19 November 1970, replacing Owen Sheehy-Skeffington
John J. Brennan	Nominated by the Taoiseach	Fianna Fáil	
Micheál Cranitch	Nominated by the Taoiseach	Fianna Fáil	
Brendan Crinion	Nominated by the Taoiseach	Fianna Fáil	Elected to the 20th Dáil at the general election on 28 February 1973
Peggy Farrell	Nominated by the Taoiseach	Fianna Fáil	
Thomas Flanagan	Nominated by the Taoiseach	Independent	
Michael Gallanagh	Nominated by the Taoiseach	Fianna Fáil	
Neville Keery	Nominated by the Taoiseach	Fianna Fáil	
Farrell McElgunn	Nominated by the Taoiseach	Fianna Fáil	
Thomas Mullins	Nominated by the Taoiseach	Fianna Fáil	
Terence O'Sullivan	Nominated by the Taoiseach	Fianna Fáil	
William Sheldon	Nominated by the Taoiseach	Independent	

== Changes ==
Date	Panel	Loss	Gain	Note
3 October 1969	Agricultural Panel	Fianna Fáil		Death of James Martin
24 February 1970	Agricultural Panel		Fianna Fáil	Cornelius O'Callaghan elected at a by-election to succeed James Martin
14 April 1970	Administrative Panel	Fine Gael		Patrick Malone elected to Dáil Éireann at a by-election
7 June 1970	Dublin University	Independent		Death of Owen Sheehy-Skeffington
16 June 1970	Administrative Panel		Fianna Fáil	Seán Keegan elected at a by-election to succeed Patrick Malone
19 November 1970	Dublin University		Independent	Trevor West elected at a by-election to succeed Owen Sheehy-Skeffington
23 February 1972	Labour Panel	Labour		Death of Jimmy Dunne
28 February 1973	Administrative Panel	Fianna Fáil		Liam Ahern elected to the 20th Dáil at the 1973 general election
28 February 1973	Industrial and Commercial Panel	Fianna Fáil		Ruairí Brugha elected to the 20th Dáil at the 1973 general election
28 February 1973	Nominated by the Taoiseach	Fianna Fáil		Brendan Crinion elected to the 20th Dáil at the 1973 general election
28 February 1973	Industrial and Commercial Panel	Fianna Fáil		Eileen Desmond elected to the 20th Dáil at the 1973 general election
28 February 1973	Labour Panel	Fianna Fáil		Joseph Farrell elected to the 20th Dáil at the 1973 general election
28 February 1973	Cultural and Educational Panel	Fianna Fáil		John Kelly elected to the 20th Dáil at the 1973 general election
28 February 1973	Agricultural Panel	Fianna Fáil		Charles McDonald elected to the 20th Dáil at the 1973 general election
28 February 1973	Administrative Panel	Fianna Fáil		Patrick J. Reynolds elected to the 20th Dáil at the 1973 general election
28 February 1973	Labour Panel	Fianna Fáil		Seán Walsh elected to the 20th Dáil at the 1973 general election
