= 9th Seanad =

Members of the Seanad from 1957 to 1961

←	8th Seanad	10th Seanad	→

Overview
- Legislative body: Seanad Éireann
- Jurisdiction: Ireland
- Meeting place: Leinster House
- Term: 22 May 1957 – 1 September 1961
- Government: 8th government of Ireland (1957–1959); 9th government of Ireland (1959–1961)
- Members: 60
- Cathaoirleach: Liam Ó Buachalla (FF)
- Leas-Chathaoirleach: Patrick Baxter (CnaT) (1957–1959); John O'Donovan (FG) (1959–1961)
- Leader of the Seanad: Thomas Mullins (FF)

The 9th Seanad was in office from 1957 to 1961. An election to Seanad Éireann, the senate of the Oireachtas (Irish parliament), followed the 1957 general election to the 16th Dáil. The senators served until the close of poll for the 10th Seanad in 1961.

On 16 May 1957, Seán Moylan was appointed as Minister for Agriculture. He was the first senator appointed as a minister since the adoption of the Constitution of Ireland in 1937. Moyland died on 16 November 1957.

== Cathaoirleach ==
On 22 May 1957, Liam Ó Buachalla (FF), Leas-Chathaoirleach of the 8th Seanad, was proposed by Eamon Kissane (FF) and seconded by Margaret Mary Pearse (FF) for the position of Cathaoirleach. Patrick Baxter (CnaT), Cathaoirleach of the 8th Seanad, was proposed by Michael Hayes (FG) and seconded by Victor Carton (FG). Ó Buachalla was elected by a vote of 32 to 22.

On 29 May 1957, Patrick Baxter was proposed by Michael Hayes and seconded by Edward McGuire (Ind) for the position of Leas-Chathaoirleach. He was elected unopposed.

Patrick Baxter died on 3 April 1959. On 30 May 1959, John O'Donovan (FG) was proposed by Michael Hayes and seconded by Edward McGuire to succeed Baxter. He was elected unopposed.

== Composition of the 9th Seanad ==
There are a total of 60 seats in the Seanad: 43 were elected on five vocational panels, 6 were elected from two university constituencies and 11 were nominated by the Taoiseach.

The following table shows the composition by party when the 9th Seanad first met on 22 May 1957.

Origin Party	Vocational panels					NUI	DU	Nominated	Total
Origin Party	Admin	Agri	Cult & Educ	Ind & Comm	Labour	NUI	DU	Nominated	Total
Fianna Fáil	2	4	2	3	5	0	0	9	25
Fine Gael	3	4	3	3	2	1	0	0	16
Labour Party	1	1	0	1	2	0	0	0	5
Clann na Talmhan	0	1	0	0	0	0	0	0	1
Independent	1	1	0	2	2	2	3	2	13
Total	7	11	5	9	11	3	3	11	60

== List of senators ==
- Note: The entries for Senators who were elected or appointed to fill vacancies are shown in italics

Name	Panel	Party	Notes
John J. Brennan	Administrative Panel	Fianna Fáil	Elected to Seanad at a by-election on 9 February 1960, replacing John O'Leary
Patrick Connor	Administrative Panel	Fine Gael	
Gerard B. Dillon	Administrative Panel	Fianna Fáil	Elected to Seanad at a by-election on 1 November 1960, replacing Patrick Teehan
Patrick Fitzsimons	Administrative Panel	Independent	
Gerry L'Estrange	Administrative Panel	Fine Gael	
John O'Leary	Administrative Panel	Labour	Died on 21 June 1959
John L. O'Sullivan	Administrative Panel	Fine Gael	
Thomas Ruane	Administrative Panel	Fianna Fáil	
Patrick Teehan	Administrative Panel	Fianna Fáil	Elected to the 16th Dáil at a by-election on 23 June 1960
Patrick Baxter	Agricultural Panel	Clann na Talmhan	Died on 3 April 1959
Patrick Crowe	Agricultural Panel	Fine Gael	
Paddy Donegan	Agricultural Panel	Fine Gael	
Daniel Hogan	Agricultural Panel	Fianna Fáil	
Robert Lahiffe	Agricultural Panel	Fianna Fáil	
William O'Callaghan	Agricultural Panel	Fine Gael	
Martin O'Dwyer	Agricultural Panel	Independent	Elected to Seanad at a by-election on 9 February 1960, replacing Patrick Baxter
Patrick O'Reilly	Agricultural Panel	Fianna Fáil	
Timothy O'Sullivan	Agricultural Panel	Fianna Fáil	
Micheál Prendergast	Agricultural Panel	Fine Gael	
John Donnelly Sheridan	Agricultural Panel	Independent	
James Tunney	Agricultural Panel	Labour	
Anthony Barry	Cultural and Educational Panel	Fine Gael	
Michael Hayes	Cultural and Educational Panel	Fine Gael	
Eamon Kissane	Cultural and Educational Panel	Fianna Fáil	
Liam Ó Buachalla	Cultural and Educational Panel	Fianna Fáil	
John O'Donovan	Cultural and Educational Panel	Fine Gael	
Denis Burke	Industrial and Commercial Panel	Fine Gael	
Tadhg Crowley	Industrial and Commercial Panel	Fianna Fáil	
Mary Davidson	Industrial and Commercial Panel	Labour	
Jane Dowdall	Industrial and Commercial Panel	Fianna Fáil	
Brian Lenihan	Industrial and Commercial Panel	Fianna Fáil	
Peter Lynch	Industrial and Commercial Panel	Independent	
Edward McGuire	Industrial and Commercial Panel	Independent	
James O'Keeffe	Industrial and Commercial Panel	Fine Gael	
Joseph Roddy	Industrial and Commercial Panel	Fine Gael	
Liam Ahern	Labour Panel	Fianna Fáil	
Edward Browne	Labour Panel	Independent	Elected to Seanad at a by-election on 1 November 1960, replacing Frank Purcell
Frank Carter	Labour Panel	Fianna Fáil	
Victor Carton	Labour Panel	Fine Gael	
Harry Colley	Labour Panel	Fianna Fáil	
Patrick Crowley	Labour Panel	Labour	
Seán Hayes	Labour Panel	Fianna Fáil	
Dominick Murphy	Labour Panel	Labour	
Ben O'Quigley	Labour Panel	Fine Gael	
Frank Purcell	Labour Panel	Independent	Died on 2 April 1960
Eoin Ryan	Labour Panel	Fianna Fáil	
Joe Sheridan	Labour Panel	Independent	
Henry Barniville	National University of Ireland	Fine Gael	Died on 23 September 1960
George O'Brien	National University of Ireland	Independent	
Patrick Quinlan	National University of Ireland	Independent	
William Fearon	Dublin University	Independent	Died on 27 December 1959
William J. E. Jessop	Dublin University	Independent	Elected to Seanad at a by-election on 13 May 1960, replacing William Fearon
Owen Sheehy-Skeffington	Dublin University	Independent	
William Bedell Stanford	Dublin University	Independent	
Seán Brady	Nominated by the Taoiseach	Fianna Fáil	
John Copeland Cole	Nominated by the Taoiseach	Independent	
Robert Farnan	Nominated by the Taoiseach	Fianna Fáil	
Seán Moylan	Nominated by the Taoiseach	Fianna Fáil	Died on 16 November 1957
Thomas Mullins	Nominated by the Taoiseach	Fianna Fáil	
Nora Connolly O'Brien	Nominated by the Taoiseach	Independent	
Seán O'Donovan	Nominated by the Taoiseach	Fianna Fáil	
Seán O'Grady	Nominated by the Taoiseach	Fianna Fáil	
Pádraig Ó Siochfhradha	Nominated by the Taoiseach	Independent	
Margaret Mary Pearse	Nominated by the Taoiseach	Fianna Fáil	
Laurence Walsh	Nominated by the Taoiseach	Fianna Fáil	
Louis Walsh	Nominated by the Taoiseach	Independent	Nominated on 20 January 1958, replacing Seán Moylan

== Changes ==
Date	Panel	Loss	Gain	Note
16 November 1957	Nominated by the Taoiseach	Fianna Fáil		Death of Seán Moylan
20 January 1958	Nominated by the Taoiseach		Independent	Louis Walsh nominated to succeed Seán Moylan
3 April 1959	Agricultural Panel	Clann na Talmhan		Death of Patrick Baxter
21 June 1959	Administrative Panel	Labour		Death of John O'Leary
27 December 1959	Dublin University	Independent		Death of William Fearon
9 February 1960	Administrative Panel		Fianna Fáil	John J. Brennan elected at a by-election to succeed John O'Leary
9 February 1960	Agricultural Panel		Independent	Martin O'Dwyer elected at a by-election to succeed Patrick Baxter
2 April 1960	Labour Panel	Independent		Death of Frank Purcell
13 May 1960	Dublin University		Independent	William J. E. Jessop elected at a by-election to succeed William Fearon
23 June 1960	Administrative Panel	Fianna Fáil		Patrick Teehan elected to the 16th Dáil at a by-election
23 September 1960	National University	Fine Gael		Death of Henry Barniville
1 November 1960	Administrative Panel		Fianna Fáil	Gerard B. Dillon elected at a by-election to succeed Patrick Teehan
1 November 1960	Labour Panel		Independent	Edward Browne elected at a by-election to succeed Frank Purcell
