= John Costelloe =

John Costelloe may refer to:

- John Costelloe (politician)
- John Costelloe (actor)

== See also ==
- John Costello (disambiguation)
