= John Costello =

John Costello may refer to:

- John Costello (baseball) (born 1960), American baseball pitcher
- John Costello (English footballer) (1890–1915), English footballer
- John Costello (historian) (1943–1995), British military historian
- John A. Costello (1891–1976), Taoiseach of Ireland
- John M. Costello (1903–1976), U.S. Representative from California
- John Costello (Medal of Honor) (1850–?), U.S. Navy sailor and Medal of Honor recipient
- John Costello (pastoralist) (1838–1923), Australian pastoralist
- John W. Costello (born 1927), American attorney and politician in Massachusetts
- John Costello (Gaelic footballer), Gaelic football player from County Laois
- John P. Costello (1947–2010), U.S. Army general

== See also ==
- John Costelloe (politician) (c. 1900–?), Irish politician, member of Seanad Éireann from 1963 to 1965
- John Costelloe (actor) (1961–2008), American actor
