= Gerard B. Dillon =

Irish politician (died 1962)

Senator
- In office 1 November 1960 – 14 December 1961
- Constituency: Administrative Panel

Personal details
- Born: c. 1905 Limerick, Ireland
- Died: 3 December 1962 (aged 56–57) Limerick, Ireland
- Party: Fianna Fáil
- Spouse: Eileen Nealon
- Children: 3

Gerard B. Dillon (c.1905 – 3 December 1962) was an Irish Fianna Fáil politician. He was a member of Seanad Éireann from 1960 to 1961. He was elected to the 9th Seanad at a by-election on 1 November 1960, replacing Patrick Teehan on the Administrative Panel. He did not contest the 1961 election.

He served as Mayor of Limerick from 1949 to 1950.
