= Terence O'Sullivan =

Terence O'Sullivan may refer to:

- Terence M. O'Sullivan (born 1955), American labor leader
- Terence O'Sullivan (politician) (1924–1997), Irish senator
- Terence Patrick O'Sullivan (1913–1970), British civil engineer

== See also ==
- Terry O'Sullivan (1915–2006), American actor
