= Eddie Bohan =

Irish politician (1932–2019)

Senator
- In office 25 April 1987 – 13 September 2007
- Constituency: Industrial and Commercial Panel

Personal details
- Born: 23 November 1932; County Longford, Ireland
- Died: 21 July 2019 (aged 86); Dublin, Ireland
- Political party: Fianna Fáil
- Spouse: Elizabeth Lambert
- Children: 4

Edward Joseph Bohan (23 November 1932 – 21 July 2019) was an Irish Fianna Fáil politician. He was an auctioneer and publican, a president of the Vintners' Federation of Ireland, and a chairman of Dublin Licensed Vintners. He was elected to the 18th Seanad in 1987 by the Industrial and Commercial Panel, and was returned to the Seanad in subsequent elections until he retired in 2007.

Bohan was born on a small farm near the village of Drumlish, County Longford on 23 November 1932, the third of seven children to James and Bridget Bohan. At age 15, he left for Dublin to join his two older brothers and started working in a grocers shop in the city. As he learned the retail trade he became involved in the confectionery business and by age 19 had a few vans on the road and a small factory producing sweets and fancy goods.

At age 23, he married Elizabeth Lambert from Rathmines and in the 1950s they decided to emigrate to North America, and spent 6 years living in Los Angeles where he became involved with the motor trade, starting off working for Chevron in a gas station and progressing to owning 3 stations of his own.

On returning to Dublin, he entered into a new career path by buying his first licensed premises, Bohans of Meath Street. He would go on to buy and run a number of well known Dublin pubs over the years. During this period he became Chairman of the Licensed Vintners Association who nominated him to run for election on the Industrial and Commercial Panel in the 1987 Seanad elections where he won the first of his five election campaigns holding a seat for 20 years.

In September 2007, his name was published in the Revenue Commissioners' list of tax defaulters after he made a settlement of €2,032,714.

He died on 21 July 2019, aged 86.
