= Michael Howard (Irish politician) =

Irish politician (1933–2009)

Senator
- In office 1 November 1989 – 17 September 1997
- In office 27 October 1977 – 25 April 1987
- Constituency: Industrial and Commercial Panel

Personal details
- Born: 19 September 1933 County Clare, Ireland
- Died: 17 February 2009 (aged 75) County Clare, Ireland
- Party: Fine Gael

Michael Howard (19 September 1933 – 17 February 2009) was an Irish Fine Gael politician who served in Seanad Éireann for nearly 20 years.

An unsuccessful candidate at the 1969 and 1973 general elections, he was elected to Seanad Éireann in 1977 by the Industrial and Commercial Panel, he served until 1987 (in the 15th, 16th, and 17th Seanads) and again from 1989 to 1997 (in the 19th and 20th Seanads), in each case being returned by the Industrial and Commercial Panel. He lost his seat at the 1997 Seanad election. He was an associate member of the British–Irish Parliamentary Assembly in 1997.

Born in Lisdoonvarna, County Clare, he was a publican and farmer. He was also a member of Clare County Council and a president of the Vintners' Federation of Ireland.
