= James Browne (Fianna Fáil politician) =

Irish politician (born 1975)

James Browne TD
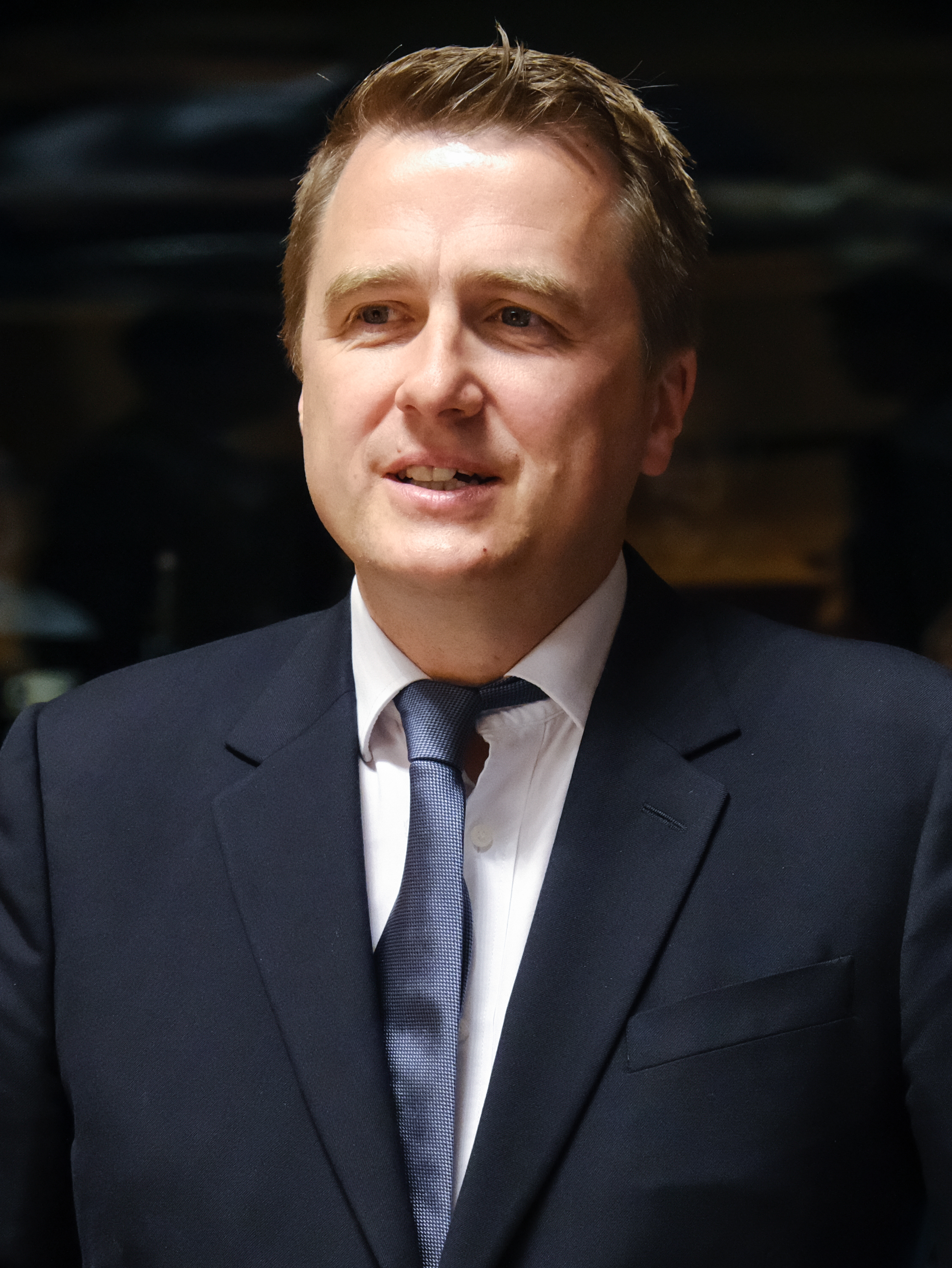
- Browne in 2023

Minister for Housing, Local Government and Heritage
- Incumbent
- Assumed office 23 January 2025
- Taoiseach: Micheál Martin
- Preceded by: Darragh O'Brien

Minister of State
- 2020–2025: Justice

Teachta Dála
- Incumbent
- Assumed office February 2016
- Constituency: Wexford

Personal details
- Born: 15 October 1975 (age 50) Wexford, Ireland
- Party: Fianna Fáil
- Parent: John Browne (father)
- Relatives: Seán Browne (granduncle)
- Education: University College Cork; King's Inns
- Website: jamesbrowne.ie

James Browne (born 15 October 1975) is an Irish Fianna Fáil politician who has served as Minister for Housing, Local Government and Heritage since January 2025. He has been a Teachta Dála (TD) for the Wexford constituency since 2016. He previously served as a Minister of State at the Department of Justice from 2020 to 2025.

Browne comes from a family of Fianna Fáil politicians. He is the only son of former TD John Browne. His grand uncle, Seán Browne, was also a TD. He studied hotel management and catering in Dublin IT before studying law in Waterford IT, University College Cork and King's Inns, where he qualified as a barrister.

He was member of Enniscorthy Town Council from 2009 to 2014. He was a member of Wexford County Council from 2014 to 2016. At the 2016 general election, Browne was selected to replace his father John as a Fianna Fáil candidate for Wexford, as he was retiring from politics. Browne was elected as a TD in this election, receiving 13.7% of the vote; however his running-mates Malcolm Byrne and Aoife Byrne were not elected.

Browne opposed the repeal of the 8th amendment in 2018, which removed the ban on abortion in Ireland.

On 2 September 2020, Browne was appointed by the coalition government led by Micheál Martin as a Minister of State at the Department of Justice with responsibility for law reform. He was assigned additional responsibility for civil justice and immigration from April to October 2021 during the maternity leave of Helen McEntee.

At the 2024 general election, Browne was re-elected to the Dáil. On 23 January 2025, Browne was appointed as Minister for Housing, Local Government and Heritage in the government led by Micheál Martin.

Political offices
Preceded by Charlie McConalogue	Minister of State at the Department of Justice; 2020–2025	Succeeded by Niall Collins
Preceded by Darragh O'Brien	Minister for Housing, Local Government and Heritage; 2025–present	Incumbent

Dáil	Election	Deputy (Party)	Deputy (Party)	Deputy (Party)	Deputy (Party)	Deputy (Party)
2nd	1921	Richard Corish (SF)	James Ryan (SF)	Séamus Doyle (SF)	Seán Etchingham (SF)	4 seats 1921–1923
3rd	1922	Richard Corish (Lab)	Daniel O'Callaghan (Lab)	Séamus Doyle (AT-SF)	Michael Doyle (FP)	4 seats 1921–1923
4th	1923	Richard Corish (Lab)	James Ryan (Rep)	Robert Lambert (Rep)	Michael Doyle (FP)	Osmond Esmonde (CnaG)
5th	1927 (Jun)	Richard Corish (Lab)	James Ryan (FF)	James Shannon (Lab)	Michael Doyle (FP)	John Keating (NL)
6th	1927 (Sep)	Richard Corish (Lab)	James Ryan (FF)	Denis Allen (FF)	Michael Jordan (FP)	Osmond Esmonde (CnaG)
7th	1932	Richard Corish (Lab)	James Ryan (FF)	Denis Allen (FF)	John Keating (CnaG)	Osmond Esmonde (CnaG)
8th	1933	Richard Corish (Lab)	James Ryan (FF)	Patrick Kehoe (FF)	John Keating (CnaG)	Osmond Esmonde (CnaG)
8th	1936 by-election	Richard Corish (Lab)	James Ryan (FF)	Patrick Kehoe (FF)	John Keating (CnaG)	Denis Allen (FF)
9th	1937	Richard Corish (Lab)	James Ryan (FF)	John Keating (FG)	John Esmonde (FG)	Denis Allen (FF)
10th	1938	Richard Corish (Lab)	James Ryan (FF)	John Keating (FG)	John Esmonde (FG)	Denis Allen (FF)
11th	1943	Richard Corish (Lab)	James Ryan (FF)	John O'Leary (Lab)	John Esmonde (FG)	Denis Allen (FF)
12th	1944	Richard Corish (Lab)	James Ryan (FF)	John O'Leary (NLP)	John Keating (FG)	Denis Allen (FF)
12th	1945 by-election	Brendan Corish (Lab)	James Ryan (FF)	John O'Leary (NLP)	John Keating (FG)	Denis Allen (FF)
13th	1948	Brendan Corish (Lab)	James Ryan (FF)	John O'Leary (NLP)	John Esmonde (FG)	Denis Allen (FF)
14th	1951	Brendan Corish (Lab)	James Ryan (FF)	John O'Leary (Lab)	Anthony Esmonde (FG)	Denis Allen (FF)
15th	1954	Brendan Corish (Lab)	James Ryan (FF)	John O'Leary (Lab)	Anthony Esmonde (FG)	Denis Allen (FF)
16th	1957	Brendan Corish (Lab)	James Ryan (FF)	Seán Browne (FF)	Anthony Esmonde (FG)	Denis Allen (FF)
17th	1961	Brendan Corish (Lab)	James Ryan (FF)	Lorcan Allen (FF)	Anthony Esmonde (FG)	4 seats 1961–1981
18th	1965	Brendan Corish (Lab)	James Kennedy (FF)	Lorcan Allen (FF)	Anthony Esmonde (FG)	4 seats 1961–1981
19th	1969	Brendan Corish (Lab)	Seán Browne (FF)	Lorcan Allen (FF)	Anthony Esmonde (FG)	4 seats 1961–1981
20th	1973	Brendan Corish (Lab)	Seán Browne (FF)	Lorcan Allen (FF)	John Esmonde (FG)	4 seats 1961–1981
21st	1977	Brendan Corish (Lab)	Seán Browne (FF)	Lorcan Allen (FF)	Michael D'Arcy (FG)	4 seats 1961–1981
22nd	1981	Brendan Corish (Lab)	Ivan Yates (FG)	Lorcan Allen (FF)	Michael D'Arcy (FG)	Hugh Byrne (FF)
23rd	1982 (Feb)	Seán Browne (FF)	Ivan Yates (FG)	Lorcan Allen (FF)	Michael D'Arcy (FG)	Hugh Byrne (FF)
24th	1982 (Nov)	Avril Doyle (FG)	Ivan Yates (FG)	John Browne (FF)	Michael D'Arcy (FG)	Hugh Byrne (FF)
25th	1987	Avril Doyle (FG)	Ivan Yates (FG)	John Browne (FF)	Brendan Howlin (Lab)	Hugh Byrne (FF)
26th	1989	Michael D'Arcy (FG)	Ivan Yates (FG)	John Browne (FF)	Brendan Howlin (Lab)	Séamus Cullimore (FF)
27th	1992	Avril Doyle (FG)	Ivan Yates (FG)	John Browne (FF)	Brendan Howlin (Lab)	Hugh Byrne (FF)
28th	1997	Michael D'Arcy (FG)	Ivan Yates (FG)	John Browne (FF)	Brendan Howlin (Lab)	Hugh Byrne (FF)
29th	2002	Paul Kehoe (FG)	Liam Twomey (Ind.)	John Browne (FF)	Brendan Howlin (Lab)	Tony Dempsey (FF)
30th	2007	Paul Kehoe (FG)	Michael W. D'Arcy (FG)	John Browne (FF)	Brendan Howlin (Lab)	Seán Connick (FF)
31st	2011	Paul Kehoe (FG)	Liam Twomey (FG)	John Browne (FF)	Brendan Howlin (Lab)	Mick Wallace (Ind.)
32nd	2016	Paul Kehoe (FG)	Michael W. D'Arcy (FG)	James Browne (FF)	Brendan Howlin (Lab)	Mick Wallace (I4C)
32nd	2019 by-election	Paul Kehoe (FG)	Michael W. D'Arcy (FG)	James Browne (FF)	Brendan Howlin (Lab)	Malcolm Byrne (FF)
33rd	2020	Paul Kehoe (FG)	Verona Murphy (Ind.)	James Browne (FF)	Brendan Howlin (Lab)	Johnny Mythen (SF)
34th	2024	4 seats since 2024	Verona Murphy (Ind.)	James Browne (FF)	George Lawlor (Lab)	Johnny Mythen (SF)
