= Joseph Brennan (senator) =

Irish politician (died 1950)

Senator
- In office 21 April 1948 – 1 February 1950
- In office 7 September 1938 – 18 August 1944
- Constituency: Industrial and Commercial Panel

Personal details
- Died: 1 February 1950
- Political party: Independent

Joseph Brennan (died 1 February 1950) was an Irish politician. He was an independent member of Seanad Éireann from 1938 to 1944, and from 1948 to 1950. He was first elected to the 3rd Seanad in 1938 by the Industrial and Commercial Panel. He was re-elected at the 1943 Seanad election but lost his seat at the 1944 election. He was re-elected at the 1948 election but died in office in 1950. The by-election for his seat was won by Mary Davidson.
