= Louis Walsh (disambiguation) =

Louis Walsh (born 1952) is an Irish entertainment manager and television personality.

Louis Walsh may also refer to:

- Louis Walsh (footballer), English footballer
- Louis Walsh (politician), member of Seanad Éireann
- Louis Joseph Walsh (1880–1942), Irish republican activist and author
- Louis Sebastian Walsh (1858–1924), American prelate of the Roman Catholic Church
- Lou Walsh (1899–1978), Australian politician
