= Peggy Farrell (politician) =

Irish businesswoman and politician (1920–2003)

Senator
- In office 5 November 1969 – 1 June 1973
- Constituency: Nominated by the Taoiseach

Personal details
- Born: Margaret Spillane; 15 November 1920 Bantry, County Cork, Ireland
- Died: 17 January 2003 (aged 82) County Cork, Ireland
- Party: Fianna Fáil
- Spouse: Thomas P. Farrell
- Children: 4
- Relatives: Timothy O'Sullivan (uncle)

Peggy Farrell (née Spillane; 15 November 1920 – 17 January 2003) was an Irish businesswoman who came to prominence through the Irish Countrywomen's Association and had a short career as a Fianna Fáil politician. She was a senator from 1969 to 1973.

She was born 1920 in Bantry, County Cork, the youngest child in the Spillane family, and educated at the Convent of Mercy in Bantry, at a rural school in Clifden, and then at the Munster Institute in Cork. She married Thomas P. Farrell, and had two daughters and two sons. The couple ran a hatchery with her husband before going into the clothing business.

Before her marriage, Farrell was a poultry inspector in the Munster Institute, but had to resign the job because the Department of Agriculture banned the employment of married women. She later defended the policy, telling The Irish Times in 1981 that "I think it is unjust and nearly unchristian that in some families you have two salaries coming in and in others none at all."

She joined the Irish Countrywomen's Association and campaigned for women in rural Ireland to have the standard of living as those in the cities. In recognition of her work, she was nominated by the Taoiseach, Jack Lynch to the 12th Seanad in 1969 (following her uncle Timothy O'Sullivan, who had been a Teachta Dála (TD) and then a senator). She then resigned her position was president of the ICA, but withdrew the resignation after it had been accepted. After advice from lawyers, the ICA executive decided that as a result of her actions, she was ineligible for the position of vice-president. In 1970 she wrote a highly charged letter to an ICA member who criticised the stance she had taken in voting against an amendment allowing married women to become officers of the new Health Boards. She told The Irish Times in 1981 that "this still stings".

In the early 1970s, Farrell started a clothing factory called Chixwear in Athlone, County Roscommon, to provide an alternative to emigration for young women in the area. She took over another factory in 1976, and in all employed 96 women.

When the women journalists on The Irish Times drew up an all-woman "fantasy cabinet" on 14 February 1973, Farrell was one of those included. Farrell died on 17 January 2003.

== See also ==
- Families in the Oireachtas
