= Michael Gallanagh =

Irish politician (1919–2001)

Senator
- In office 5 November 1969 – 1 June 1973
- Constituency: Nominated by the Taoiseach

Personal details
- Born: 1919
- Died: 1 December 2001 (aged 81–82)
- Party: Fianna Fáil

Michael Gallanagh (1919 – 1 December 2001) was an Irish Fianna Fáil politician and army captain. He was a member of Seanad Éireann from 1969 to 1973. He was nominated by the Taoiseach to the 12th Seanad in 1969. He lost his seat at the 1973 Seanad election.
