= John Brennan (Irish senator) =

Irish politician (1901–1977)

- Brennan in 1957

Senator
- In office 1 June 1973 – 27 October 1977
- In office 23 June 1965 – 5 November 1969
- Constituency: Industrial and Commercial Panel
- In office 5 November 1969 – 1 June 1973
- In office 14 December 1961 – 23 June 1965
- Constituency: Nominated by the Taoiseach
- In office 9 February 1960 – 14 December 1961
- Constituency: Administrative Panel

Personal details
- Born: 1901 County Monaghan, Ireland
- Died: 6 August 1977 (aged 75–76) County Monaghan, Ireland
- Party: Fianna Fáil

Military service
- Branch/service: Irish Republican Army
- Battles/wars: Irish War of Independence

John J. Brennan (1901 – 6 August 1977) was a draper and publican, Fianna Fáil politician and a member of Seanad Éireann from 1960 to 1977.

He was from Clontibret in County Monaghan and was active in the Irish Republican Army during the Irish War of Independence. He was elected to the County Council in 1942. In Castleblayney, he was chair of the urban district council and president of the chamber of commerce. He stood unsuccessfully for Dáil Éireann in Monaghan in the elections of 1948, 1954, and 1957. He was a friend and early political backer of Erskine H. Childers, Monaghan TD and later President of Ireland.

He was elected to the 9th Seanad on 9 February 1960 at a by-election to the Administrative Panel caused by the death of John O'Leary. He was elected to the 11th (1965) and 13th (1973) Seanad from the Industrial and Commercial Panel, and was nominated by the Taoiseach to the 10th Seanad in 1961 and to the 12th Seanad in 1969.
