= Seán Brady (senator) =

Irish politician (1890–1969)

Senator
- In office 14 December 1961 – 23 June 1965
- Constituency: Administrative Panel
- In office 22 May 1957 – 14 December 1961
- Constituency: Nominated by the Taoiseach

Personal details
- Born: 1890
- Died: 29 December 1969 (aged 78–79)
- Party: Fianna Fáil

Seán Brady (1890 – 29 December 1969) was an Irish Fianna Fáil politician. He was a member of Seanad Éireann from 1957 to 1965. He was nominated by the Taoiseach to the 9th Seanad in 1957, and was elected to the 10th Seanad in 1961 by the Administrative Panel. He did not contest the 1965 election.
