= Michael Yeats =

Irish politician and barrister (1921–2007)

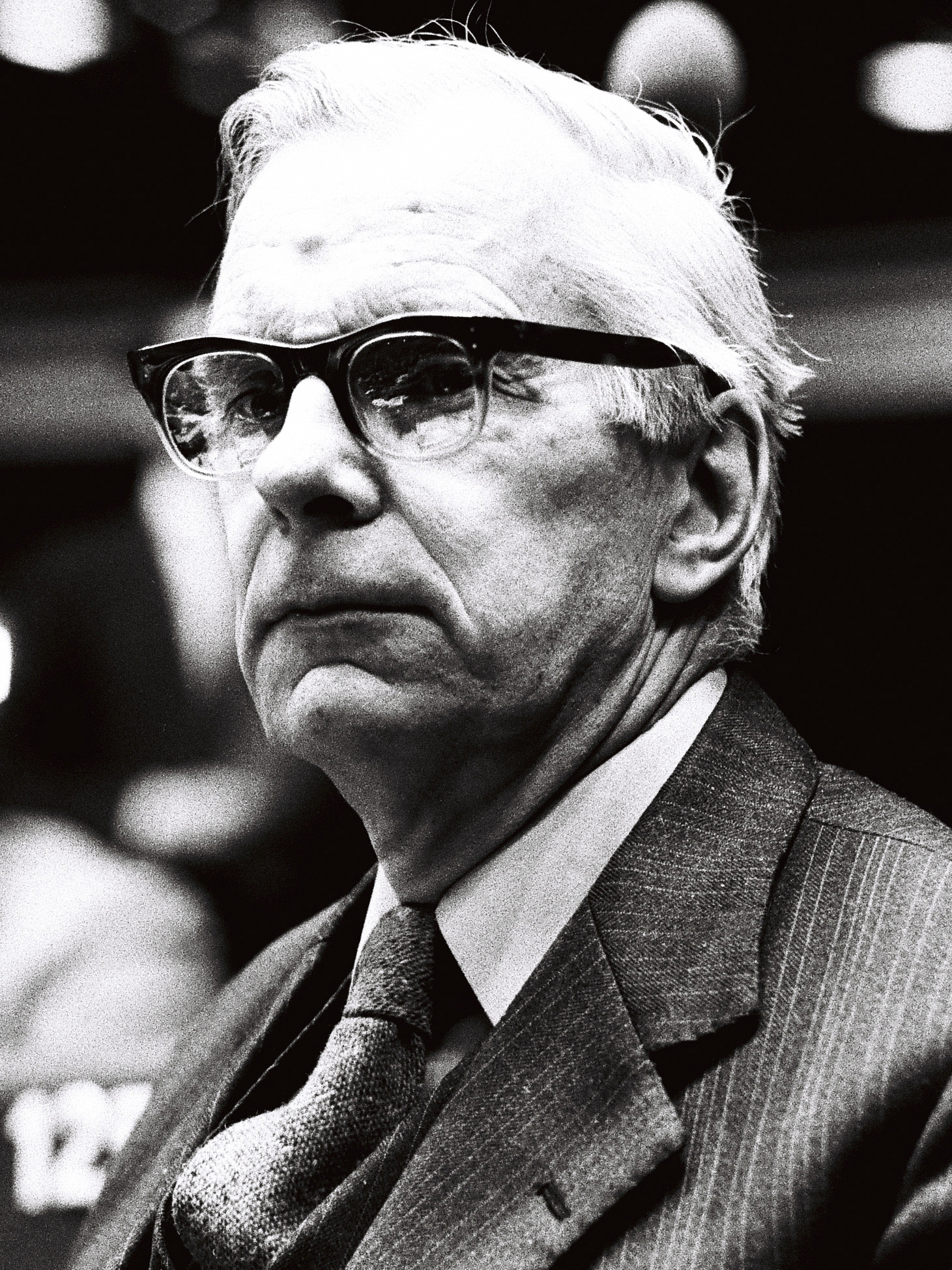
- Yeats in 1977

Cathaoirleach of Seanad Éireann
- In office 5 November 1969 – 3 January 1973
- Preceded by: Liam Ó Buachalla
- Succeeded by: Micheál Cranitch

Senator
- In office 27 October 1977 – 12 March 1980
- Constituency: Nominated by the Taoiseach
- In office 5 November 1969 – 27 October 1977
- Constituency: Cultural and Educational Panel
- In office 23 June 1965 – 5 November 1969
- Constituency: Nominated by the Taoiseach
- In office 14 December 1961 – 23 June 1965
- Constituency: Labour Panel
- In office 14 August 1951 – 22 July 1954
- Constituency: Nominated by the Taoiseach

Member of the European Parliament
- In office January 1973 – June 1979
- Constituency: Oireachtas Delegation

Personal details
- Born: 22 August 1921 Thame, Oxfordshire, England
- Died: 3 January 2007 (aged 85) Dublin, Ireland
- Party: Fianna Fáil
- Spouse: Gráinne Yeats
- Parents: W. B. Yeats; Georgie Hyde-Lees
- Education: Trinity College Dublin

Michael Butler Yeats (22 August 1921 – 3 January 2007) was an Irish barrister and Fianna Fáil politician. He served two periods as a member of Seanad Éireann.

== Biography ==
=== Early life ===
His was the son of W. B. Yeats, a poet and Nobel Laureate who had served in the Seanad of the Irish Free State, and Georgie Hyde-Lees. His sister Anne Yeats was a painter and designer, as was his uncle Jack Butler Yeats. Michael was educated at St Columba's College, Dublin and Trinity College Dublin, where he gained first class honours degree in history. He was an officer in the College Historical Society. He also qualified as a lawyer but did not practise.

=== Political career ===
He unsuccessfully stood for election to Dáil Éireann at the 1948 general election and the 1951 general election for the Dublin South-East constituency. Following the 1951 election, Yeats was nominated to the 7th Seanad by the Taoiseach Éamon de Valera. He stood at the subsequent election in 1954 for the 8th Seanad but was not elected.

From 1961 to 1980 he was a member of Seanad Éireann. In 1961 he was elected to the 10th Seanad on the Labour Panel. In 1965 he was nominated by the Taoiseach Seán Lemass to the 11th Seanad. In 1969 he was elected to the 12th Seanad on the Cultural and Educational Panel, and re-elected to the 13th Seanad in 1973.

In 1969, he was elected as Cathaoirleach of the 12th Seanad. On 1 January 1973, he resigned as Cathaoirleach on his appointment as a member of the Irish delegation in the European Parliament, while continuing as a member of the Seanad. He also served in the second and third delegations.

In 1977, he was nominated by the Taoiseach Jack Lynch to the 14th Seanad. He stood at the first direct elections in 1979 for the Dublin constituency but was not elected.

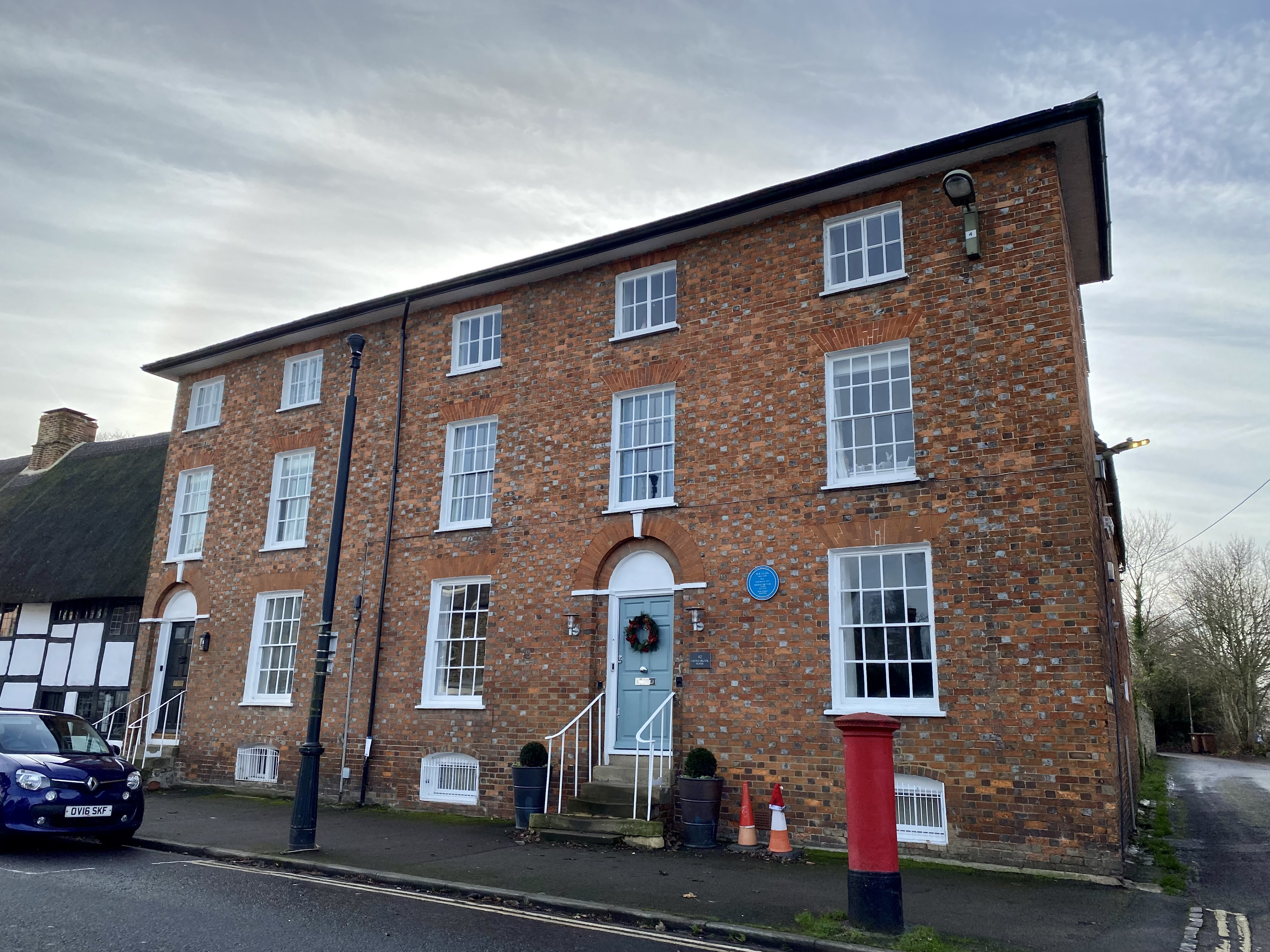
42 High Street, Thame, Oxfordshire. The birthplace of Yeats in 1921.

He resigned from the Seanad on 12 March 1980, taking up office in April 1980 as Director General of the EEC Council of Ministers in Brussels in the 1980s.

== Personal life ==
He was married to Gráinne Ní Éigeartaigh, a singer and Irish harpist. They had four children; three daughters and a son.

He died on 4 January 2007.

== See also ==
- Families in the Oireachtas

== Sources ==
- Cast a Cold Eye (autobiography), Dublin: Blackwater Press, ISBN 0-86121-968-6.

Oireachtas
Preceded by Liam Ó Buachalla	Cathaoirleach of Seanad Éireann; 1969–1973	Succeeded by Micheál Cranitch
