= Joseph Quigley =

Irish politician, farmer and auctioneer (1899–1974)

Senator
- In office 14 December 1961 – 23 June 1965
- Constituency: Industrial and Commercial Panel

Personal details
- Born: 22 November 1899
- Died: 25 March 1974 (aged 74)
- Party: Fine Gael

Joseph Quigley (22 November 1899 – 25 March 1974) was an Irish Fine Gael politician. He was a member of Seanad Éireann from 1961 to 1965. He was elected to the 10th Seanad in 1961 by the Industrial and Commercial Panel. He lost his seat at the 1965 Seanad election.
