= W. G. E. Luddington =

England international rugby union player

William George Ernest Luddington (8 February 1894 – 10 January 1941 (aged 46)) was an England international rugby union footballer who gained 13 caps between 1922 and 1926. He was a goal-kicking fly-half or centre, playing for Devonport Services and the Royal Navy.

He served as a Master-at-arms in the Royal Navy during the Second World War and was killed, aged 46, during the attack by Axis aircraft on HMS Illustrious on 10 January 1941. Having no known grave, he is listed on the Plymouth Naval Memorial. His father was Thomas Levi Luddington who served with the Army Hospital Corps and took part in the defence of Rorkes Drift 1879
