= John O'Leary (Wexford politician) =

Irish politician (1894–1959)

- O'Leary, c. 1959

Senator
- In office 22 May 1957 – 21 June 1959
- Constituency: Administrative Panel

Teachta Dála
- In office June 1943 – March 1957
- Constituency: Wexford

Personal details
- Born: 1 September 1894 County Wexford, Ireland
- Died: 21 June 1959 (aged 64)
- Party: Labour Party
- Other political affiliations: National Labour Party (1944–1950)

John O'Leary (1 September 1894 – 21 June 1959) was an Irish Labour Party politician who served in the Oireachtas for nearly twenty years, first as Teachta Dála (TD) for Wexford and then as a Senator.

He was elected to Dáil Éireann as a Labour Party TD for the Wexford constituency at the 1943 general election. He was re-elected at the 1944 and 1948 general elections as a National Labour Party TD. At the 1951 and 1954 general elections, he was once again elected as a Labour Party TD.

O'Leary was defeated at the 1957 general election, but was elected to the 9th Seanad by the Administrative Panel. He died in office in 1959, and John J. Brennan of Fianna Fáil was elected at a by-election to replace him.

| Dáil | Election | Deputy (Party) | Deputy (Party) | Deputy (Party) | Deputy (Party) | Deputy (Party) |
|---|---|---|---|---|---|---|
| 2nd | 1921 | Richard Corish (SF) | James Ryan (SF) | Séamus Doyle (SF) | Seán Etchingham (SF) | 4 seats 1921–1923 |
| 3rd | 1922 | Richard Corish (Lab) | Daniel O'Callaghan (Lab) | Séamus Doyle (AT-SF) | Michael Doyle (FP) | 4 seats 1921–1923 |
| 4th | 1923 | Richard Corish (Lab) | James Ryan (Rep) | Robert Lambert (Rep) | Michael Doyle (FP) | Osmond Esmonde (CnaG) |
| 5th | 1927 (Jun) | Richard Corish (Lab) | James Ryan (FF) | James Shannon (Lab) | Michael Doyle (FP) | John Keating (NL) |
| 6th | 1927 (Sep) | Richard Corish (Lab) | James Ryan (FF) | Denis Allen (FF) | Michael Jordan (FP) | Osmond Esmonde (CnaG) |
| 7th | 1932 | Richard Corish (Lab) | James Ryan (FF) | Denis Allen (FF) | John Keating (CnaG) | Osmond Esmonde (CnaG) |
| 8th | 1933 | Richard Corish (Lab) | James Ryan (FF) | Patrick Kehoe (FF) | John Keating (CnaG) | Osmond Esmonde (CnaG) |
| 8th | 1936 by-election | Richard Corish (Lab) | James Ryan (FF) | Patrick Kehoe (FF) | John Keating (CnaG) | Denis Allen (FF) |
| 9th | 1937 | Richard Corish (Lab) | James Ryan (FF) | John Keating (FG) | John Esmonde (FG) | Denis Allen (FF) |
| 10th | 1938 | Richard Corish (Lab) | James Ryan (FF) | John Keating (FG) | John Esmonde (FG) | Denis Allen (FF) |
| 11th | 1943 | Richard Corish (Lab) | James Ryan (FF) | John O'Leary (Lab) | John Esmonde (FG) | Denis Allen (FF) |
| 12th | 1944 | Richard Corish (Lab) | James Ryan (FF) | John O'Leary (NLP) | John Keating (FG) | Denis Allen (FF) |
| 12th | 1945 by-election | Brendan Corish (Lab) | James Ryan (FF) | John O'Leary (NLP) | John Keating (FG) | Denis Allen (FF) |
| 13th | 1948 | Brendan Corish (Lab) | James Ryan (FF) | John O'Leary (NLP) | John Esmonde (FG) | Denis Allen (FF) |
| 14th | 1951 | Brendan Corish (Lab) | James Ryan (FF) | John O'Leary (Lab) | Anthony Esmonde (FG) | Denis Allen (FF) |
| 15th | 1954 | Brendan Corish (Lab) | James Ryan (FF) | John O'Leary (Lab) | Anthony Esmonde (FG) | Denis Allen (FF) |
| 16th | 1957 | Brendan Corish (Lab) | James Ryan (FF) | Seán Browne (FF) | Anthony Esmonde (FG) | Denis Allen (FF) |
| 17th | 1961 | Brendan Corish (Lab) | James Ryan (FF) | Lorcan Allen (FF) | Anthony Esmonde (FG) | 4 seats 1961–1981 |
| 18th | 1965 | Brendan Corish (Lab) | James Kennedy (FF) | Lorcan Allen (FF) | Anthony Esmonde (FG) | 4 seats 1961–1981 |
| 19th | 1969 | Brendan Corish (Lab) | Seán Browne (FF) | Lorcan Allen (FF) | Anthony Esmonde (FG) | 4 seats 1961–1981 |
| 20th | 1973 | Brendan Corish (Lab) | Seán Browne (FF) | Lorcan Allen (FF) | John Esmonde (FG) | 4 seats 1961–1981 |
| 21st | 1977 | Brendan Corish (Lab) | Seán Browne (FF) | Lorcan Allen (FF) | Michael D'Arcy (FG) | 4 seats 1961–1981 |
| 22nd | 1981 | Brendan Corish (Lab) | Ivan Yates (FG) | Lorcan Allen (FF) | Michael D'Arcy (FG) | Hugh Byrne (FF) |
| 23rd | 1982 (Feb) | Seán Browne (FF) | Ivan Yates (FG) | Lorcan Allen (FF) | Michael D'Arcy (FG) | Hugh Byrne (FF) |
| 24th | 1982 (Nov) | Avril Doyle (FG) | Ivan Yates (FG) | John Browne (FF) | Michael D'Arcy (FG) | Hugh Byrne (FF) |
| 25th | 1987 | Avril Doyle (FG) | Ivan Yates (FG) | John Browne (FF) | Brendan Howlin (Lab) | Hugh Byrne (FF) |
| 26th | 1989 | Michael D'Arcy (FG) | Ivan Yates (FG) | John Browne (FF) | Brendan Howlin (Lab) | Séamus Cullimore (FF) |
| 27th | 1992 | Avril Doyle (FG) | Ivan Yates (FG) | John Browne (FF) | Brendan Howlin (Lab) | Hugh Byrne (FF) |
| 28th | 1997 | Michael D'Arcy (FG) | Ivan Yates (FG) | John Browne (FF) | Brendan Howlin (Lab) | Hugh Byrne (FF) |
| 29th | 2002 | Paul Kehoe (FG) | Liam Twomey (Ind.) | John Browne (FF) | Brendan Howlin (Lab) | Tony Dempsey (FF) |
| 30th | 2007 | Paul Kehoe (FG) | Michael W. D'Arcy (FG) | John Browne (FF) | Brendan Howlin (Lab) | Seán Connick (FF) |
| 31st | 2011 | Paul Kehoe (FG) | Liam Twomey (FG) | John Browne (FF) | Brendan Howlin (Lab) | Mick Wallace (Ind.) |
| 32nd | 2016 | Paul Kehoe (FG) | Michael W. D'Arcy (FG) | James Browne (FF) | Brendan Howlin (Lab) | Mick Wallace (I4C) |
| 32nd | 2019 by-election | Paul Kehoe (FG) | Michael W. D'Arcy (FG) | James Browne (FF) | Brendan Howlin (Lab) | Malcolm Byrne (FF) |
| 33rd | 2020 | Paul Kehoe (FG) | Verona Murphy (Ind.) | James Browne (FF) | Brendan Howlin (Lab) | Johnny Mythen (SF) |
| 34th | 2024 | 4 seats since 2024 | Verona Murphy (Ind.) | James Browne (FF) | George Lawlor (Lab) | Johnny Mythen (SF) |
