= Ben O'Quigley =

Irish politician (died 1969)

Senator
- In office 23 June 1965 – 29 May 1969
- Constituency: Cultural and Educational Panel
- In office 22 May 1957 – 14 December 1961
- Constituency: Labour Panel

Personal details
- Born: John Benignus O'Quigley County Mayo, Ireland
- Died: 29 May 1969 Lourdes, France
- Party: Fine Gael
- Spouse: Margaret Kennedy (m. 1965)

John Benignus O'Quigley (died 29 May 1969) was an Irish barrister and Fine Gael politician from Castlebar, County Mayo. He was twice a member of Seanad Éireann.

O'Quigley entered the Civil Service in 1945. In 1950 he was called to the bar and resigned from the Civil Service. He practised law in Dublin and on the Western Circuit. In September 1955 he married Margaret Kennedy from Straffan. After the 1957 general election, O'Quigley was elected to the 9th Seanad on the Labour Panel. After the 1961 general election, he failed to be re-elected.

From 1962 to 1965, O'Quigley was junior counsel, initially instructed by Richie Ryan, and later under Seán MacBride, on the legal team of plaintiff Gladys Ryan in Ryan v Attorney General, a water fluoridation controversy case wherein the Supreme Court found the Constitution of Ireland safeguarded the unenumerated right to bodily integrity. After the 1965 general election O'Quigley was elected to the 11th Seanad, this time from the Cultural and Educational Panel. He became leader of the Fine Gael group in the Seanad. He was ill for some time before his death, and died in Lourdes.

Trade union offices
New office	General Secretary of the Civil Service Executive and Higher Officers' Association; 1949–1961	Succeeded by Dympna Headen
