= John Browne (Fianna Fáil politician) =

Irish former politician (born 1948)

Minister of State
- 2007–2008: Agriculture, Fisheries and Food
- 2006–2007: Communications, Marine and Natural Resources
- 2004–2006: Agriculture and Food
- 2002–2004: Communications, Marine and Natural Resources
- 1993–1994: Environment
- 1992–1993: Agriculture and Food

Teachta Dála
- In office November 1982 – February 2016
- Constituency: Wexford

Personal details
- Born: 1 August 1948 (age 78) Marshalstown, County Wexford, Ireland
- Party: Fianna Fáil
- Spouse: Judy Doyle
- Children: 4, including James
- Relatives: Seán Browne (uncle)

John Browne (born 1 August 1948) is an Irish former Fianna Fáil politician. He was a Teachta Dála (TD) for the Wexford constituency from 1982 to 2016. He is a former Minister of State, serving in various roles from 1992 to 1994, and 2002 to 2008.

== Early and private life ==
John Browne was born in Marshalstown, County Wexford in 1948. He was educated locally at St Mary's Christian Brothers School in Enniscorthy. Browne worked as a salesman and an oil truck driver before becoming involved in politics and also played hurling for the Wexford county team.

Browne is married to Judy and they have three children, a fourth child now deceased. His uncle Seán Browne, was also a TD, who was first elected in 1957. He retired due to ill health. John Browne topped the poll in the constituency of Wexford on a number of occasions.

== Political career ==
Browne first held political office in 1979 when he was elected to Enniscorthy Urban District Council and to Wexford County Council. Browne was first elected to Dáil Éireann at the November 1982 general election for the constituency of Wexford and has been re-elected at every election since.

Over his career Browne has held a number of government and opposition positions. Not long after his election he was appointed assistant Chief Whip. When Fianna Fáil returned to office in 1987 he remained on the backbenches. When Albert Reynolds became Taoiseach in 1992, he appointed Browne as Minister of State at the Department of Agriculture and Food with special responsibility for the Food Industry. When a new government was formed in January 1993, he was appointed as Minister of State at the Environment with special responsibility for Environmental Protection, serving in that position until 1994.

In 1997, Fianna Fáil returned to office, but Browne remained on the backbenches; during the campaign, party leader Bertie Ahern had issued a rebuke to Browne for his opposition to entering government with the Progressive Democrats. In 2002 he was appointed as Minister of State at the Department of Communications, Marine and Natural Resources with special responsibility for the Marine. In a 2004 reshuffle, Ahern appointed Browne as Minister of State at the Department of Agriculture and Food, with special responsibility for Forestry. In a junior ministerial reshuffle in February 2006, Browne was appointed again as Minister of State at the Department of Communications, Marine and Natural Resources with special responsibility for the Marine. Browne has also served as chair of a number of Oireachtas Committees, including, Agriculture, Marine, Social Affairs, and Finance. After the 2007 general election, he was appointed as Minister of State at the Department of Agriculture, Fisheries and Food with special responsibility for Fisheries, serving in a similar role after a transfer of ministerial functions.

On 13 May 2008, after Brian Cowen became Taoiseach, Browne was not appointed to any ministerial position.

Browne was involved in controversy in November 2011 when it emerged that the Department of Public Expenditure and Reform incorrectly paid him a pension from his time as a junior minister at the Department of Agriculture worth €7,396.31 despite still being a sitting TD. The Department of Public Expenditure and Reform apologised to the TD for the embarrassment caused to him.

Browne retired at the 2016 general election. His son James Browne was elected at that election, and in 2020, was appointed as a Minister of State.

Political offices
Preceded by Joe Walsh	Minister of State at the Department of Agriculture and Food; 1992–1993	Succeeded by Brian O'Shea
Preceded by Mary Harney	Minister of State at the Department of the Environment; 1993–1994	Succeeded by Emmet Stagg
Preceded by Hugh Byrne	Minister of State for the Marine; 2002–2004	Succeeded by Pat "the Cope" Gallagher
New office	Minister of State for Forestry; 2004–2006	Succeeded by Mary Wallace
Preceded by Pat "the Cope" Gallagher	Minister of State for the Marine; 2006–2007	Succeeded by Himself as Minister of State for Fisheries
Preceded by Himself as Minister of State for the Marine	Minister of State for Fisheries; 2007–2008	Succeeded by Tony Killeen
Party political offices
Preceded by Séamus Kirk	Chair of the Fianna Fáil parliamentary party 2009–2016	Succeeded by Brendan Smith

Dáil	Election	Deputy (Party)	Deputy (Party)	Deputy (Party)	Deputy (Party)	Deputy (Party)
2nd	1921	Richard Corish (SF)	James Ryan (SF)	Séamus Doyle (SF)	Seán Etchingham (SF)	4 seats 1921–1923
3rd	1922	Richard Corish (Lab)	Daniel O'Callaghan (Lab)	Séamus Doyle (AT-SF)	Michael Doyle (FP)	4 seats 1921–1923
4th	1923	Richard Corish (Lab)	James Ryan (Rep)	Robert Lambert (Rep)	Michael Doyle (FP)	Osmond Esmonde (CnaG)
5th	1927 (Jun)	Richard Corish (Lab)	James Ryan (FF)	James Shannon (Lab)	Michael Doyle (FP)	John Keating (NL)
6th	1927 (Sep)	Richard Corish (Lab)	James Ryan (FF)	Denis Allen (FF)	Michael Jordan (FP)	Osmond Esmonde (CnaG)
7th	1932	Richard Corish (Lab)	James Ryan (FF)	Denis Allen (FF)	John Keating (CnaG)	Osmond Esmonde (CnaG)
8th	1933	Richard Corish (Lab)	James Ryan (FF)	Patrick Kehoe (FF)	John Keating (CnaG)	Osmond Esmonde (CnaG)
8th	1936 by-election	Richard Corish (Lab)	James Ryan (FF)	Patrick Kehoe (FF)	John Keating (CnaG)	Denis Allen (FF)
9th	1937	Richard Corish (Lab)	James Ryan (FF)	John Keating (FG)	John Esmonde (FG)	Denis Allen (FF)
10th	1938	Richard Corish (Lab)	James Ryan (FF)	John Keating (FG)	John Esmonde (FG)	Denis Allen (FF)
11th	1943	Richard Corish (Lab)	James Ryan (FF)	John O'Leary (Lab)	John Esmonde (FG)	Denis Allen (FF)
12th	1944	Richard Corish (Lab)	James Ryan (FF)	John O'Leary (NLP)	John Keating (FG)	Denis Allen (FF)
12th	1945 by-election	Brendan Corish (Lab)	James Ryan (FF)	John O'Leary (NLP)	John Keating (FG)	Denis Allen (FF)
13th	1948	Brendan Corish (Lab)	James Ryan (FF)	John O'Leary (NLP)	John Esmonde (FG)	Denis Allen (FF)
14th	1951	Brendan Corish (Lab)	James Ryan (FF)	John O'Leary (Lab)	Anthony Esmonde (FG)	Denis Allen (FF)
15th	1954	Brendan Corish (Lab)	James Ryan (FF)	John O'Leary (Lab)	Anthony Esmonde (FG)	Denis Allen (FF)
16th	1957	Brendan Corish (Lab)	James Ryan (FF)	Seán Browne (FF)	Anthony Esmonde (FG)	Denis Allen (FF)
17th	1961	Brendan Corish (Lab)	James Ryan (FF)	Lorcan Allen (FF)	Anthony Esmonde (FG)	4 seats 1961–1981
18th	1965	Brendan Corish (Lab)	James Kennedy (FF)	Lorcan Allen (FF)	Anthony Esmonde (FG)	4 seats 1961–1981
19th	1969	Brendan Corish (Lab)	Seán Browne (FF)	Lorcan Allen (FF)	Anthony Esmonde (FG)	4 seats 1961–1981
20th	1973	Brendan Corish (Lab)	Seán Browne (FF)	Lorcan Allen (FF)	John Esmonde (FG)	4 seats 1961–1981
21st	1977	Brendan Corish (Lab)	Seán Browne (FF)	Lorcan Allen (FF)	Michael D'Arcy (FG)	4 seats 1961–1981
22nd	1981	Brendan Corish (Lab)	Ivan Yates (FG)	Lorcan Allen (FF)	Michael D'Arcy (FG)	Hugh Byrne (FF)
23rd	1982 (Feb)	Seán Browne (FF)	Ivan Yates (FG)	Lorcan Allen (FF)	Michael D'Arcy (FG)	Hugh Byrne (FF)
24th	1982 (Nov)	Avril Doyle (FG)	Ivan Yates (FG)	John Browne (FF)	Michael D'Arcy (FG)	Hugh Byrne (FF)
25th	1987	Avril Doyle (FG)	Ivan Yates (FG)	John Browne (FF)	Brendan Howlin (Lab)	Hugh Byrne (FF)
26th	1989	Michael D'Arcy (FG)	Ivan Yates (FG)	John Browne (FF)	Brendan Howlin (Lab)	Séamus Cullimore (FF)
27th	1992	Avril Doyle (FG)	Ivan Yates (FG)	John Browne (FF)	Brendan Howlin (Lab)	Hugh Byrne (FF)
28th	1997	Michael D'Arcy (FG)	Ivan Yates (FG)	John Browne (FF)	Brendan Howlin (Lab)	Hugh Byrne (FF)
29th	2002	Paul Kehoe (FG)	Liam Twomey (Ind.)	John Browne (FF)	Brendan Howlin (Lab)	Tony Dempsey (FF)
30th	2007	Paul Kehoe (FG)	Michael W. D'Arcy (FG)	John Browne (FF)	Brendan Howlin (Lab)	Seán Connick (FF)
31st	2011	Paul Kehoe (FG)	Liam Twomey (FG)	John Browne (FF)	Brendan Howlin (Lab)	Mick Wallace (Ind.)
32nd	2016	Paul Kehoe (FG)	Michael W. D'Arcy (FG)	James Browne (FF)	Brendan Howlin (Lab)	Mick Wallace (I4C)
32nd	2019 by-election	Paul Kehoe (FG)	Michael W. D'Arcy (FG)	James Browne (FF)	Brendan Howlin (Lab)	Malcolm Byrne (FF)
33rd	2020	Paul Kehoe (FG)	Verona Murphy (Ind.)	James Browne (FF)	Brendan Howlin (Lab)	Johnny Mythen (SF)
34th	2024	4 seats since 2024	Verona Murphy (Ind.)	James Browne (FF)	George Lawlor (Lab)	Johnny Mythen (SF)
