= Micheál Cranitch =

Irish politician (1912–1952)

Cathaoirleach of Seanad Éireann
- In office 3 January – 1 June 1973
- Preceded by: Michael Yeats
- Succeeded by: James Dooge

Senator
- In office 27 October 1977 – 23 February 1983
- Constituency: Administrative Panel
- In office 5 November 1969 – 1 June 1973
- Constituency: Nominated by the Taoiseach

Personal details
- Born: 1 December 1912 Rathcormac, County Cork, Ireland
- Died: 23 November 1999 (aged 86) County Cork, Ireland
- Party: Fianna Fáil

Mícheál C. Cranitch (1 December 1912 – 23 November 1999) was an Irish Fianna Fáil politician. He was Cathaoirleach of Seanad Éireann in 1973.

Cranitch was born in Rathcormac, County Cork. In 1969 he was nominated by the Taoiseach Jack Lynch to the 12th Seanad. In 1973, he stood for election on the Administrative Panel, but did not win a seat. However, in 1977 he won a seat in the 14th Seanad, which he held until his defeat in the 1983 election to the 18th Seanad.

He served as Cathaoirleach of the Seanad, from January to June 1973.

Oireachtas
Preceded by Michael Yeats	Cathaoirleach of Seanad Éireann; Jan.–Jun. 1973	Succeeded by James Dooge
