= Edward Browne (Irish politician) =

Irish politician and trade unionist

Senator
- In office 11 October 1960 – 14 December 1961
- Constituency: Labour Panel

Personal details
- Party: Independent

Edward Browne was an Irish politician and trade union official. He was an independent member of Seanad Éireann from 1960 to 1961. He was returned to the 9th Seanad on the Labour Panel on 11 October 1960, replacing Frank Purcell in an uncontested by-election. He was nominated by the Irish Congress of Trade Unions, of which he was vice president; the only other nominating body, the Irish Conference of Professional and Service Organisations, made no nomination. Browne lost his seat at the 1961 Seanad election.
