= Plymouth Naval Memorial =

War memorial in Plymouth, Devon, England

Coordinates: 50.3656°N 4.1422°W

- Commonwealth War Graves Commission
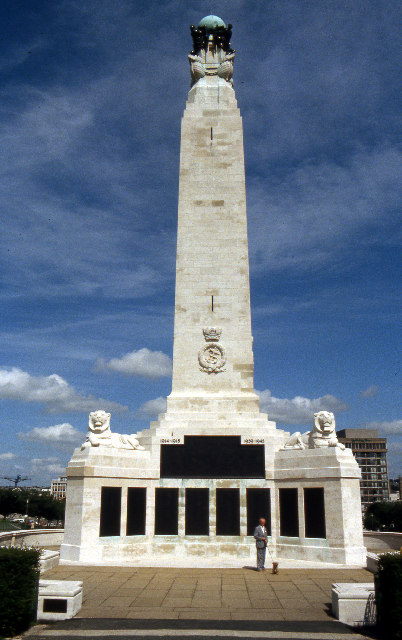
- Plymouth Naval Memorial from the seaward side
- For members of the Royal Navy who died during the First and Second World War and have no known grave
- Unveiled: 29 July 1924
- Designed by: Robert Lorimer
- Commemorated: 23,211

The Plymouth Naval Memorial is a war memorial in Plymouth, Devon, England which is dedicated to British and Commonwealth sailors who were lost in World War I and World War II with no known grave.

== History ==
After World War I, the Royal Navy wanted to find a way to commemorate sailors and Royal Marines who had died at sea and had no known grave. An Admiralty committee recommended building memorials at the three main naval ports in Great Britain – Plymouth, Chatham, and Portsmouth. The memorials at all three sites were designed by Sir Robert Lorimer with sculpture by Henry Poole.

During World War II, the cable of a runaway barrage balloon struck the globe at the top of the memorial, leaving a large dent which has remained ever since.

Following World War II, the naval memorials were expanded to commemorate the dead from that war. Sir Edward Maufe performed the architectural design for the expansion at Plymouth, and the sculpture was by Charles Wheeler and William McMillan. The work was carried out by Martyns

The Plymouth memorial also bears the names of sailors from Australia, South Africa, and India. The Plymouth Naval Memorial commemorates 7,251 sailors of World War I and 15,933 of World War II.

Other memorials in Halifax and Victoria in Canada, Auckland, New Zealand, Mumbai, India, Chittagong, Bangladesh, and Hong Kong commemorate sailors who came from those parts of the Commonwealth. The Newfoundland Memorial at Beaumont Hamel in France bears the names of 229 Newfoundland sailors lost at sea during World War I.

The memorial is maintained by the Commonwealth War Graves Commission. It became a Grade II listed building in 1975, upgraded to Grade II* in 1998, and was further upgraded to Grade I in May 2016 for the centenary of the Battle of Jutland.

== Location ==
The memorial is situated centrally on The Hoe which looks directly towards Plymouth Sound.

== Design ==
The memorial features a central obelisk, with names of the dead arranged according to the year of death. Those for the First World War are on panels affixed to the obelisk's base; those for the Second World War are on panels set into the surrounding wall. Within each year, the names are grouped by service, then by rank and surname.

== Notable people commemorated at the memorial ==
=== First World War ===
- Lieutenant Cecil Abercrombie and Lieutenant-Commander John Skinner Wilson, Scottish rugby internationals
- Sergeant John Costello of the Royal Marines, English footballer
- Josephine Carr, first Women's Royal Naval Service woman to be killed on active duty.

=== Second World War ===
- Master-at-Arms W. G. E. Luddington, Royal Navy rugby representative player
- Admiral Sir Tom Phillips
- Able Seaman Walter Sidebottom, English footballer

== See also ==
- Chatham Naval Memorial
- Portsmouth Naval Memorial
- Grade I listed war memorials in England
