= Gráinne Yeats =

Irish harpist and singer (1925–2013)

- Born: 14 April 1925; Dublin, Ireland
- Died: 18 April 2013 (aged 88)
- Occupations: Harpist and singer
- Spouse: Michael Yeats

Gráinne Yeats (14 April 1925 – 18 April 2013) was an Irish harpist and singer, and also a historian of the Irish harp.

== Biography ==
Yeat was born as Gráinne Ní hEigeartaigh in Dublin and raised bilingually in Irish and English. As well as obtaining a degree in history from Trinity College Dublin, she studied piano, voice and harp at the Royal Irish Academy of Music in Dublin and also traditional songs and music from the Irish-speaking (Gaeltacht) areas of Ireland.

She wrote and researched the history and music of the Cláirseach (wire-strung harp), and she was one of the first professional musicians to revive and record this ancient traditional instrument.

She wrote entries about Turlough O'Carolan and other Irish harpers in the New Grove Dictionary of Music and Musicians.

Gráinne Yeats was married to Michael Yeats, a Fianna Fáil politician and son of the poet W. B. Yeats. They had three daughters and a son, Caitriona, Siobhán, Síle, and Pádraig.

She died on 18 April 2013 aged 88.

== Discs ==
- The Belfast Harp Festival 1792–1992 Féile Cruitirí Bhéal Feirste: Gael-Linn CEFCD 156 (double-CD, 1992).

== Books and publications ==
- "Some Thoughts on Irish Harp Music", in Ceol vol. IV, no. 2 (December 1973), p. 37–50.
- Féile na gCruitirí Béal Feirste 1792 / The Belfast Harpers Festival 1792 (Dublin: Gael-Linn, 1980).
- "The Rediscovery of Carolan", in Integrating Tradition: The Achievement of Seán O Riada; ed. Bernard Harris & Grattan Freyer (Ballina: Irish Humanities Center & Keohanes & Chester Springs PA: Dufour Editions, 1981), p. 78–94.
- "Lost Chords", Ceol vol. VII, no. 1–2 (December 1984), p. 15–19.
