= Terence O'Sullivan (politician) =

Irish politician (1924–1997)

Senator
- In office 5 November 1969 – 1 June 1973
- Constituency: Nominated by the Taoiseach

Personal details
- Born: 1924
- Died: 14 March 1997 (aged 72–73)
- Party: Fianna Fáil

Terence O'Sullivan (1924 – 14 March 1997) was an Irish Fianna Fáil politician. He was a member of Seanad Éireann from 1969 to 1973. He was nominated by the Taoiseach to the 12th Seanad in 1969. He lost his seat at the 1973 Seanad election.
