= John Costello (English footballer) =

English footballer (1890–1915)

Personal information
- Full name: John Castelli
- Date of birth: 15 May 1890
- Place of birth: Blackley, England
- Date of death: 24 June 1915 (aged 25)
- Place of death: HMHS Soudan, off Gallipoli, Ottoman Turkey
- Height: 5 ft 8 in (1.73 m)
- Position: Right back

Senior career*
Years	Team	Apps	(Gls)
- Altrincham
1911	Rochdale	1	(0)
- Longfield
1913–1914	Glossop	7	(0)
- Stockport County
- * Club domestic league appearances and goals

John Castelli, known as Costello (15 May 1890 – 24 June 1915) was an English professional footballer who played in the Football League for Glossop as a right back.

== Personal life ==
Costello worked as a warehouseman. On 30 September 1914, a month after the outbreak of the First World War, he enlisted in the Plymouth Battalion, 63rd (Royal Naval) Division of the Royal Marine Light Infantry. He held the rank of sergeant and was shot in the right ankle at Gallipoli on 12 June 1915. Evacuated to the hospital ship HMHS Soudan, Costello died of wounds on 24 June 1915. He is commemorated on the Plymouth Naval Memorial.

== Career statistics ==
Appearances and goals by club, season and competition
Club	Season	League			FA Cup		Total	
Club	Season	Division	Apps	Goals	Apps	Goals	Apps	Goals
Glossop	1913–14	Second Division	7	0	0	0	7	0
Career total			7	0	0	0	7	0
