= James Martin (Irish politician) =

Irish politician (1905–1969)

Senator
- In office 23 June 1965 – 3 October 1969
- Constituency: Agricultural Panel

Personal details
- Born: 1905 County Galway, Ireland
- Died: 3 October 1969 (aged 63–64)
- Party: Fianna Fáil

James J. Martin (1905 – 3 October 1969) was an Irish Fianna Fáil politician. He was a member of Seanad Éireann from 1965 to 1969. He was elected to the 11th Seanad in 1965 by the Agricultural Panel. He was re-elected at the 1969 Seanad election but died in office in October 1969.

He had stood unsuccessfully for Dáil Éireann as a Fianna Fáil candidate for the Laois–Offaly constituency at the 1957, 1961 and 1965 general elections.
