= Frank Purcell =

Irish politician and trade unionist (died 1960)

Senator
- In office 22 July 1954 – 2 April 1960
- Constituency: Labour Panel

Personal details
- Died: 2 April 1960
- Party: Independent

Frank Purcell (died 2 April 1960) was an Irish politician and trade union official. He served as General Secretary of the Irish Transport and General Workers' Union in 1948. He was an independent member of Seanad Éireann from 1954 to 1960. He was elected to the 8th Seanad in 1954 by the Labour Panel. He was re-elected at the 1957 election but died in office in 1960. Edward Browne was elected to fill the vacancy.
