= 1960 Carlow–Kilkenny by-election =

By-election to the 16th Dáil

- 23 June 1960
- Turnout: 38,085 (68.2%)
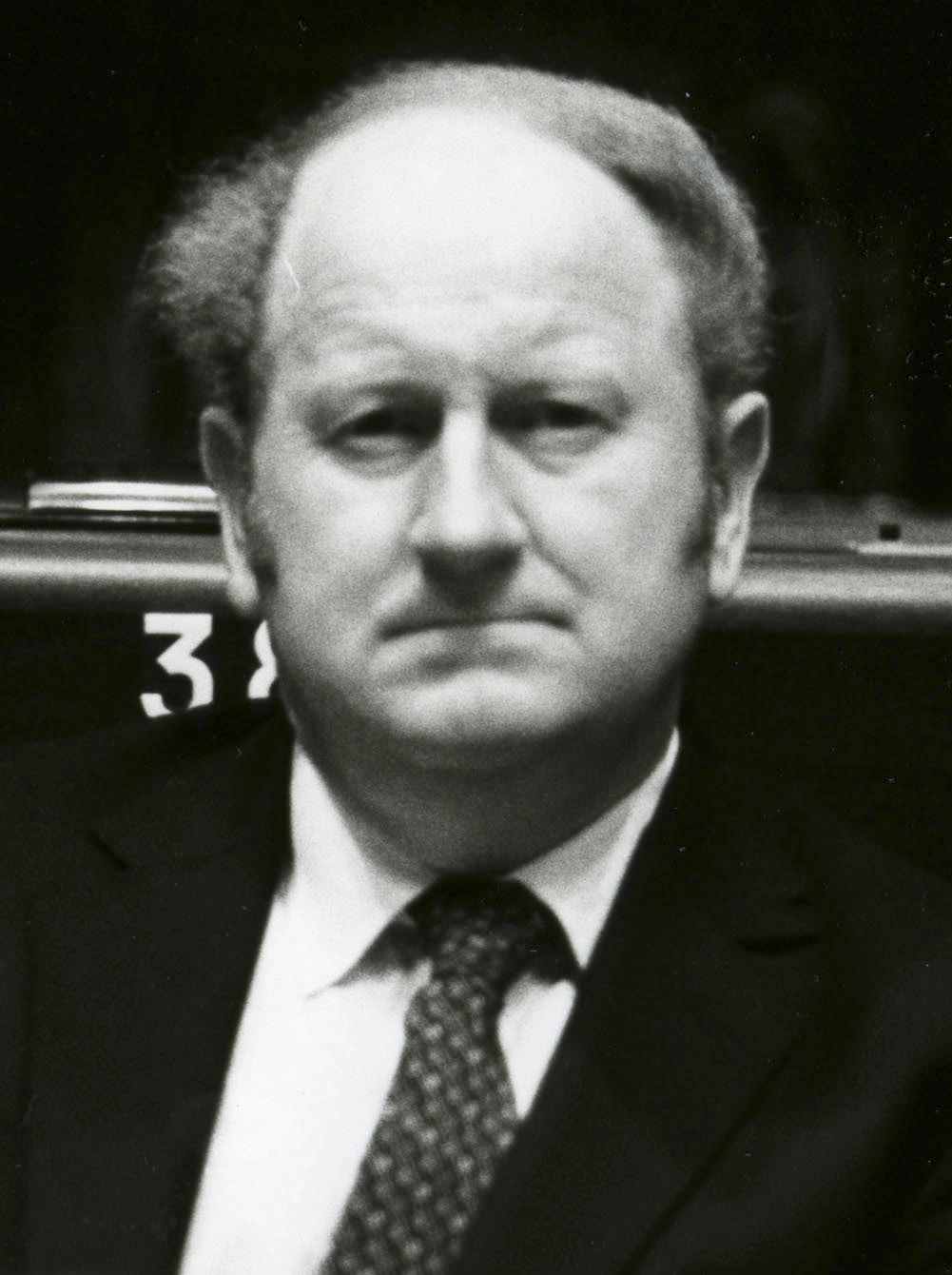
	Teehan	Governey
Nominee	Patrick Teehan	Desmond Governey	Séamus Pattison
Party	Fianna Fáil	Fine Gael	Labour
First preferences	15,515	14,892	7,678
Percentage	40.7%	39.1%	20.2%
Final count	17,555	17,426	–
TD before election
Joseph Hughes
Fine Gael
TD after election
Patrick Teehan
Fianna Fáil

A Dáil by-election was held in the constituency of Carlow–Kilkenny in Ireland on Thursday, 23 June 1960, to fill a vacancy in the 16th Dáil. It followed the death of Fine Gael Teachta Dála (TD) Joseph Hughes on 20 January 1960.

The writ of election to fill the vacancy was agreed by the Dáil on 25 May 1960.

The Elections Act 1960 enabled the election to be held the same day as the 1960 local elections, using the same administrative apparatus.

The by-election was won by the Fianna Fáil candidate Senator Patrick Teehan.

Teehan lost his seat at the 1961 general election, and was never subsequently re-elected to the Dáil.

== Result ==
1960 Carlow–Kilkenny by-election
Party	Candidate	FPv%	Count	
Party	Candidate	FPv%	1	2
Fianna Fáil	Patrick Teehan	40.7	15,515	17,555
Fine Gael	Desmond Governey	39.1	14,892	17,426
Labour	Séamus Pattison	20.2	7,678	
Electorate: 55,848 Valid: 38,085 Quota: 19,043 Turnout: 68.2%
