= Louis Walsh (politician) =

Irish politician

Senator
- In office 20 January 1958 – 15 November 1961
- Constituency: nominated by the Taoiseach
- In office 22 July 1954 – 22 May 1957
- Constituency: Administrative Panel

Personal details
- Party: Independent

Louis Walsh was an Irish politician. He was an independent member of Seanad Éireann from 1954 to 1957, and from 1958 to 1961. He was elected to the 8th Seanad in 1954 by the Administrative Panel. He lost his seat at the 1957 Seanad election. He was nominated by the Taoiseach to the 9th Seanad on 20 January 1958, replacing Seán Moylan. He was deemed to have vacated his seat on being appointed County Registrar on 15 November 1961.
