= John Costelloe (politician) =

Irish politician (1900–unknown)

Senator
- In office 28 November 1963 – 23 June 1965
- Constituency: Industrial and Commercial Panel

Personal details
- Born: April 1900 County Kerry, Ireland
- Party: Fianna Fáil

John Costelloe (April 1900 – date of death unknown) was an Irish shopkeeper and Fianna Fáil politician who served for two years as a member of the 10th Seanad.

Costelloe was from Ballyduff, County Kerry. He was nominated as a candidate to the Industrial and Commercial Panel of the Seanad by the Taoiseach, Seán Lemass following the death of Fianna Fáil senator Daniel Moloney At the by-election, on 28 November 1963, Costelloe was elected on the first count with 112 votes as opposed to 87 for his Fine Gael opponent John Conlan (in a Seanad panel by-election, the electorate consists of the sitting deputies and senators).

Writing in The Irish Times under the pseudonym Backbencher, journalist John Healy claimed that Costelloe's election was due to the "Kerry Mafia" in Fianna Fáil who had insisted that Moloney, a Kerry native, should be replaced by someone from the same area. A much younger candidate had been proposed but was outvoted; in Healy's view this was through the influence of long-serving Kerry North TD Tom McEllistrim who hoped his son, also Tom McEllistrim would inherit his seat on his retirement, and wanted to ensure no other candidate could use the Seanad seat to build support in the constituency.

Healy, suggesting Costelloe was older than his claimed age of 63, and was poorly qualified for the Industrial and Commercial Panel ("He runs a tidy little grocery shop and he has a bit of land."), pointed out that he had previously failed to be elected to Kerry County Council, and suggested Costelloe would have little to contribute in the Seanad ("he will cause the shorthand takers no trouble"). In the event, he made just four interventions during his term.

He was not re-elected at the 1965 Seanad election.
