= Timothy O'Sullivan (Fianna Fáil politician) =

Irish politician (1899–1971)

Senator
- In office 22 July 1954 – 5 November 1969
- Constituency: Agricultural Panel

Teachta Dála
- In office July 1937 – May 1954
- Constituency: Cork West

Personal details
- Born: 26 July 1899 Bantry, County Cork, Ireland
- Died: 3 March 1971 (aged 71) County Cork, Ireland
- Party: Fianna Fáil
- Spouse: Catherine Daly (m. 1926)
- Children: 12
- Relatives: Peggy Farrell (niece)

Timothy (Ted) O'Sullivan (26 July 1899 – 3 March 1971) was an Irish Fianna Fáil politician from County Cork. He was a Teachta Dála (TD) for 27 years, and a Senator for 15 years.

O'Sullivan was elected to Dáil Éireann at his first attempt, as a Fianna Fáil candidate for the Cork West constituency at the 1937 general election. He was re-elected for Cork West at the next five general elections, until he retired from the Dáil at the 1954 general election.

He was then stood in the 1954 election to Seanad Éireann, on the Agricultural Panel, and was elected to the 8th Seanad. He was re-elected by the Agricultural Panel at the next three Seanad elections, before retiring from politics in 1969, after completing his term in the 11th Seanad.

His niece Peggy Farrell was a senator from 1969 to 1973.

== See also ==
- Families in the Oireachtas

Dáil	Election	Deputy (Party)	Deputy (Party)	Deputy (Party)	Deputy (Party)	Deputy (Party)
4th	1923	Timothy J. Murphy (Lab)	Seán Buckley (Rep)	Cornelius Connolly (CnaG)	John Prior (CnaG)	Timothy O'Donovan (FP)
5th	1927 (Jun)	Timothy J. Murphy (Lab)	Thomas Mullins (FF)	Timothy Sheehy (CnaG)	Jasper Wolfe (Ind.)	Timothy O'Donovan (FP)
6th	1927 (Sep)	Timothy J. Murphy (Lab)	Thomas Mullins (FF)	Timothy Sheehy (CnaG)	Jasper Wolfe (Ind.)	Timothy O'Donovan (FP)
7th	1932	Timothy J. Murphy (Lab)	Raphael Keyes (FF)	Eamonn O'Neill (CnaG)	Jasper Wolfe (Ind.)	Timothy O'Donovan (FP)
8th	1933	Timothy J. Murphy (Lab)	Tom Hales (FF)	Eamonn O'Neill (CnaG)	James Burke (CnaG)	Timothy O'Donovan (NCP)
9th	1937	Timothy J. Murphy (Lab)	Timothy O'Sullivan (FF)	Daniel O'Leary (FG)	Eamonn O'Neill (FG)	Timothy O'Donovan (FG)
10th	1938	Timothy J. Murphy (Lab)	Timothy O'Sullivan (FF)	Seán Buckley (FF)	Eamonn O'Neill (FG)	Timothy O'Donovan (FG)
11th	1943	Timothy J. Murphy (Lab)	Timothy O'Sullivan (FF)	Seán Buckley (FF)	Patrick O'Driscoll (Ind.)	Timothy O'Donovan (FG)
12th	1944	Timothy J. Murphy (Lab)	Timothy O'Sullivan (FF)	Seán Buckley (FF)	Patrick O'Driscoll (Ind.)	Eamonn O'Neill (FG)
13th	1948	Timothy J. Murphy (Lab)	Timothy O'Sullivan (FF)	Seán Collins (FG)	3 seats 1948–1961	
13th	1949 by-election	William J. Murphy (Lab)	Timothy O'Sullivan (FF)	Seán Collins (FG)	3 seats 1948–1961	
14th	1951	Michael Pat Murphy (Lab)	Timothy O'Sullivan (FF)	Seán Collins (FG)	3 seats 1948–1961	
15th	1954	Michael Pat Murphy (Lab)	Edward Cotter (FF)	Seán Collins (FG)	3 seats 1948–1961	
16th	1957	Michael Pat Murphy (Lab)	Edward Cotter (FF)	Florence Wycherley (Ind.)	3 seats 1948–1961	
17th	1961	Constituency abolished. See Cork South-West				
