= Vintners' Federation of Ireland =

Trade association of publicans

The Vintners' Federation of Ireland (VFI) is a trade association of publicans in Ireland. With over 4,000 members as at 2022, it lobbies vigorously on behalf of publicans.

The VFI only represents publicans outside Dublin (even though their headquarters are in Rathfarnham, a suburb of Dublin). Its president (since April 2021) is Paul Moynihan who runs a pub in County Wicklow. The VFI produces a bi-monthly magazine VFI Voice.

Dublin publicans are represented by the Licensed Vintners Association (LVA), a longer-established (but smaller) organisation. In 2014 the LVA and VFI floated the possibility of merging, but as at 2022 this has not happened.
