= Patrick W. Ryan =

Irish politician (died 1993)

Senator
- In office 14 December 1961 – 1 June 1973
- Constituency: Agricultural Panel

Personal details
- Died: 26 December 1993
- Party: Independent

Patrick W. Ryan (died 26 December 1993) was an Irish politician. He was an independent member of Seanad Éireann from 1961 to 1973. He was elected to the 10th Seanad in 1961 by the Agricultural Panel. He was re-elected at the 1965 and 1969 Seanad elections but lost his seat at the 1973 election.
