= Jack Fitzgerald (Irish politician) =

Irish politician (1914–1994)

Senator
- In office 14 December 1961 – 27 October 1977
- Constituency: Agricultural Panel

Personal details
- Born: 1914
- Died: 7 October 1994 (aged 79–80)
- Party: Labour Party

John Fitzgerald (1914 – 7 October 1994) was an Irish Labour Party politician. A farmer and salesman, he was elected to Seanad Éireann by the Agricultural Panel at the 1961 Seanad election, and was re-elected in 1965, 1969 and 1973. He did not contest the 1977 Seanad election.
