= James Dooge =

Irish politician and engineer (1922–2010)

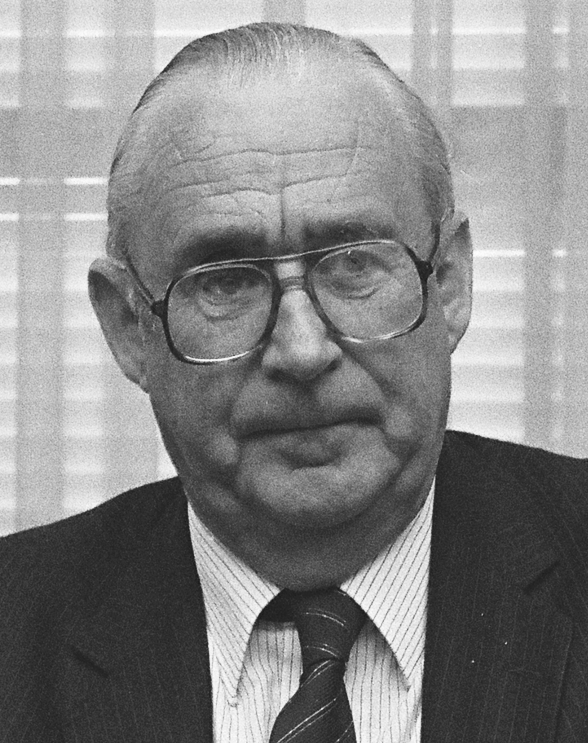
- Dooge in 1981

Minister for Foreign Affairs
- In office 21 October 1981 – 9 March 1982
- Taoiseach: Garret FitzGerald
- Preceded by: John M. Kelly
- Succeeded by: Gerry Collins

Leader of the Seanad
- In office 21 December 1982 – 3 April 1987
- Taoiseach: Garret FitzGerald
- Preceded by: Eoin Ryan Snr
- Succeeded by: Mick Lanigan

Leader of Fine Gael in the Seanad
- In office 20 December 1982 – 10 April 1987
- Leader: Garret FitzGerald
- Preceded by: Gemma Hussey
- Succeeded by: Maurice Manning

Cathaoirleach of Seanad Éireann
- In office 16 June 1973 – 29 October 1977
- Preceded by: Micheál Cranitch
- Succeeded by: Séamus Dolan

Senator
- In office 13 May 1982 – 25 April 1987
- Constituency: National University
- In office 8 October 1981 – 13 May 1982
- Constituency: Nominated by the Taoiseach
- In office 5 November 1969 – 27 October 1977
- Constituency: Industrial and Commercial Panel
- In office 14 December 1961 – 5 November 1969
- Constituency: Labour Panel

Personal details
- Born: 30 July 1922 Birkenhead, Cheshire, England
- Died: 20 August 2010 (aged 88) Monkstown, Dublin, Ireland
- Party: Fine Gael
- Spouse: Roni Dooge (m. 1950; died 1991)
- Children: 2
- Education: University College Dublin; University of Iowa

James Clement Dooge (30 July 1922 – 20 August 2010) was an Irish Fine Gael politician, engineer, climatologist, hydrologist and academic who served as Minister for Foreign Affairs from 1981 to 1982, Leader of the Seanad and Leader of Fine Gael in the Seanad from 1982 to 1987 and Cathaoirleach of Seanad Éireann from 1973 to 1977. He served as a Senator from 1961 to 1977 and 1981 to 1987.

Dooge had a profound effect on the debate over climate change, in the world of hydrology and in politics in the formation of the European Union.

His career spanned academia, politics and international affairs with his roles including a period as Minister for Foreign Affairs, a member of the Presidential Commission during two presidential vacancies, chair of the report that led to the Single European Act (SEA) and the Maastricht Treaty, Professor of Engineering in University College Cork and University College Dublin, President of the International Council for Science (ICSU), President of the Royal Irish Academy and Chair of the Irish Film Board.

Dooge was a member of the Fellowship of Engineering, and worked as an expert consultant to a wide range of specialised United Nations agencies including UNESCO, World Meteorological Organization (WMO), United Nations Environment Programme (UNEP), and the Food and Agriculture Organization (FAO). He also acted in an expert consultancy role to DGXII (Research) at the European Commission.

He was as only the second senator since 1937 to be appointed to the cabinet. In the world of academia he is known for his numerous publications in the field of hydrology, having developed unit hydrograph theory in 1959, and is generally regarded as a pioneer in the field. His work in Europe through the Dooge Committee led to the SEA and the Maastricht Treaty.

Upon his death in 2010, UNESCO-IHE described him as a "towering figure and pioneer in hydrology", while the Chancellor of the National University of Ireland, Maurice Manning, described him as "that rare phenomenon in Irish life, a public intellectual whose life was devoted, without posture, to the public service". John Sweeney, one of the scientists as part of the Intergovernmental Panel on Climate Change honoured with the Nobel Peace Prize in 2007, described him as "perhaps one of the most important, prolific and distinguished scientists of the past generation".

== Early life, career and academia ==
James Dooge was born in Birkenhead, England, in 1922. He was educated in Liverpool before moving to Dún Laoghaire and was educated by at Christian Brothers College. Dooge's father was an engineer, and so were other relatives. At school Dooge convinced the authorities to bring in an applied mathematics teacher in to tutor him on the subject.

He went on to University College Dublin (here he was awarded the Pierce Malone Scholarship in Theory of Structures and Strength of Materials) and qualified as an engineer. In 1942 he obtained a job with the Office of Public Works and in 1946 he began working with the Electricity Supply Board (ESB). Between 1954 and 1956 he was research associate at the Department of Civil engineering at the University of Iowa, and obtained a master's degree. Back working for the ESB in Ireland in 1956, he worked on a number of projects on the River Shannon. In 1958 Dooge became Professor of Civil engineering at University College Cork. In 1970 he became a professor at University College Dublin. Between 1984 and 1987 Dooge worked at the Department of Engineering Hydrology at University College Galway. From 1988 he worked at University College Dublin at the Centre for Water Resources Research. From 1987 to 1990 he was also President of the Royal Irish Academy.

Dooge received an Honorary Doctorate from Heriot-Watt University in 2000.

Since the 1980s, the International Association of Hydrological Sciences has awarded the Dooge medal, one of two annual awards that recognizes accomplishments in the field of hydrology.

== Contributions to science and hydrology ==
=== Hydrology ===
With numerous publications on the subject, he is credited with turning hydrology from an empirical technology into the science it is today. Alongside fellow Irishman Eamon Nash, he was the founder of what today is called systems hydrology in the early sixties.

In the 1960s, Dooge was active in developing an international network of hydrology scientists and engineers that stretched from the US to the then USSR: "These contacts were very beneficial, enabling research taking place from all over the world to link up in meaningful ways and, in a sense, helping establish an international hydrological community. Initially, we were an informal group of six. This grew to the point where we had a committee of 12". Eventually this led to the establishment of the International Commission on Water Resource Systems within the International Association for Hydrological Sciences (IAHS). He served as its president for several years.

=== Climate change ===
Dooge was involved in some of the earliest work done to identify the causes of climate change. He was heavily involved in the discussions within WMO in 1978 that eventually led to the first World Climate Conference being held in Geneva in 1979. At the discussions a group of four were given two questions; Is there such a thing as a climate problem? And, if there is, is it serious enough to call a world conference of scientists to discuss it?

He served as chair of the Scientific Advisory Committee of the World Climate Impact Advisory Committee and, on behalf of the UN secretary general, on the International Decade of Natural Disasters Advisory Board.

He witnessed first-hand the phenomenal growth in climate change awareness: "At that first conference the attendance was almost exclusively made up of scientists and engineers whereas, when the second World Climate Conference took place in 1990, the scientists and engineers were joined by a strong contingent of politicians, a sign that interest in the issues had broadened considerably."

In 1990, WMO launched the idea of an International Conference on Water and Climate that would be held as a preparatory meeting for the Rio Summit on the environment and development. Dooge arranged for the Conference to be held in Dublin in January 1992. References are still made at international gatherings to the "Dublin Conference" as the most influential international conference in the field of water. Under his chairpersonship the conference adopted the "Dublin Principles" that have been influential in shaping water management policy over the last 20 years.

== Political career ==
As well as having a distinguished career as an academic, Dooge led a very active political life. His great-grandfather had been the first chair of the elected Kingstown County Borough Council. Dooge was a member of Dublin City Council from 1948, and gained notice from the Taoiseach of the time, John A. Costello.

From 1961 to 1977 Dooge was a Senator in Seanad Éireann, serving as its Cathaoirleach (chairperson) from 1973 to 1977. He worked closely with his colleague Garret FitzGerald from the 1960s onward in establishing the so-called Just Society wing of the Fine Gael party. As Cathaoirleach, Dooge was a member of the commission – which also includes the Ceann Comhairle (or Speaker of the Dáil), and the Chief Justice – established by the Constitution to discharge the duties of the President in the event of the absence or incapacity of the President or during a vacancy in the office as a consequence of the death or resignation of the President. This happened twice during Dooge's term as Cathaoirleach. The first (only the second time in the history of the creation of the office in 1937) followed the death of Erskine Hamilton Childers. The second in 1976 followed the resignation of Cearbhall Ó Dálaigh in 1976. In 1977 Dooge retired from politics, choosing to "devote more time to academic concerns and international cooperation in science and engineering".

In 1981 he made a return to politics, and was appointed by the then Taoiseach FitzGerald as Minister for Foreign Affairs in the short-lived Fine Gael-led government. The appointment was suggested by FitzGerald's wife who believed only Dooge could stop him frequently interfering in this area. When a new coalition government was formed in December 1982 (which would last until 1987), Dooge declined re-appointment to the post owing to the decline of his sight. Between 1982 and 1987 he returned to Seanad Éireann. He rejected an offer from FitzGerald of becoming a European Commissioner.

Dooge was a delegate of Fine Gael at the New Ireland Forum in 1985.

== European Integration-Dooge Report ==
He had a primary role in the intergovernmental building of a report into improving the co-operation of the European Economic Community (EEC) in 1984 during Ireland's presidency. His appointment was not without controversy: Garret FitzGerald insisted on the appointment of Dooge despite German pressure for West Germany's former president, Karl Carstens, to be given the role. This work, the Dooge Report, is credited as helping form the basis of the Single European Act and the Treaty of Maastricht; those documents use much of the same language.

== Awards ==
He was hailed as one of the founding fathers of modern hydrology.

Year	Award
1953	Horton Award
1983	International Hydrology Prize
1986	William Bowie Medal, recognizing his "outstanding contribution to fundamental geophysics and for unselfish co-operation in research"
2000	Elected International Fellow at the Royal Academy of Engineering as an "outstanding" figure in the science of hydrology
2001	International Meteorological Organization Prize, World Meteorological Organization
2005	Prince Philip Medal, recognizing him as "an outstanding figure in the field of hydrology"
2006	Royal Irish Academy Gold Medal for Engineering Sciences (by President of Ireland, Mary McAleese)

== Publications ==
=== Books ===
==== Hydrology ====
- (1973) Dooge, J.C.I., Linear theory of hydrologic systems (Technical bulletin / United States Department of Agriculture) Publisher: Agricultural Research Service, US Dept. of Agriculture (1973)
- (2003) Dooge, J.C.I., and O'Kane, J.P., Deterministic Methods in Systems Hydrology: IHE Delft Lecture Note Series (UNESCO-IHE Delft Lecture Note Series) ISBN 978-90-5809-392-9
- (2004) Young, Gordon J., Dooge, J.C.I., and Rodda, John C., Global Water Resource Issues ISBN 978-0-521-46712-4

==== European politics ====
- (1999) Dooge, J.C.I., and Barrington, R., A Vital National Interest: Ireland in Europe 1973–1998 ISBN 978-1-902448-22-0
- (2002) Dooge, J.C.I., What the Treaty of Nice Means ISBN 978-1-874109-56-3

==== Irish politics ====
- (1986) Dooge, J.C.I. (ed.), Ireland in the Contemporary World: Essays in Honour of Garret Fitzgerald ISBN 978-0-7171-1494-8

=== Selected scholarly articles and reports ===
==== European politics ====
- (Brussels, 29—30 March 1985) Report of the Ad Hoc Committee for Institutional Affairs to the European Council (commonly called the Dooge Report)

==== Hydrology ====
- (1986) Dooge, J.C.I., "Looking for hydrologic laws", Water Resources Research, 22(9), 46S–58S.
- (1997) Dooge, J.C.I., "Searching for Simplicity in Hydrology", Surveys in Geophysics, 18: 511–534, 1997.
- (2003) Dooge, J.C.I., "Linear Theory of Hydrological Systems", EGU Reprint Series, 1, 2003.
- (2005) Dooge, J.C.I., "Bringing it all together", Hydrol. Earth Syst. Sci., 9, 3–14, 2005

== Death ==
Dooge died at his home in Dublin on 20 August 2010.

Oireachtas
Preceded by Micheál Cranitch	Cathaoirleach of Seanad Éireann; 1973–1977	Succeeded by Séamus Dolan
Political offices
Preceded by John Kelly	Minister for Foreign Affairs; 1981–1982	Succeeded by Gerry Collins
