= John J. Nash =

Irish politician (died 1989)

Senator
- In office 14 December 1961 – 1 June 1973
- Constituency: Cultural and Educational Panel

Personal details
- Died: February 1989
- Party: Fianna Fáil

John Joseph Nash (died February 1989) was a member of Seanad Éireann from 1961 to 1973 on the Cultural and Educational Panel. He represented Fianna Fáil. He resided in Templemore Co. Tipperary where he was the owner of Tipperary Glass. He died in an accident while on holiday in February 1989.
