= Thomas Flanagan (Irish politician) =

Irish politician (died 1980)

Senator
- In office 5 November 1969 – 1 June 1973
- Constituency: Nominated by the Taoiseach
- In office 14 December 1961 – 5 November 1969
- Constituency: Industrial and Commercial Panel

Personal details
- Died: 7 October 1980
- Party: Independent

Thomas P. Flanagan (died 7 October 1980) was as Irish civil engineer who served for three terms in Seanad Éireann.

In 1961, he was elected to the 10th Seanad by the Industrial and Commercial Panel, which re-elected him in 1965 to the 11th Seanad. The Taoiseach, Jack Lynch, nominated him to the 12th Seanad. He did not contest the 1973 election to the 13th Seanad.
