= Patrick Crowley =

Irish politician and trade unionist (1906–1993)

Senator
- In office 22 July 1954 – 5 November 1969
- Constituency: Labour Panel

Personal details
- Born: 14 April 1906 County Galway, Ireland
- Died: 17 December 1993 (aged 87)
- Party: Labour Party

Patrick Crowley (14 April 1906 – 17 December 1993) was an Irish Labour Party politician and trade union official.

He stood for election to Dáil Éireann for the Cork West constituency at the 1943 general election but was not successful. He was a member of Seanad Éireann from 1954 to 1969. He was first elected to the 8th Seanad in 1954 by the Labour Panel, and was re-elected at the 1957, 1961 and 1965 elections. He lost his seat at the 1969 Seanad election.
