= Mary Davidson (Irish politician) =

Irish politician (1902–1986)

Senator
- In office 22 July 1954 – 5 November 1969
- In office 16 June 1950 – 14 August 1951
- Constituency: Industrial and Commercial Panel

Personal details
- Born: 1902
- Died: 29 May 1986 (aged 83–84)
- Party: Labour Party

Mary Frances Davidson (1902 – 29 May 1986) was an Irish Labour Party politician. She was elected to Seanad Éireann on the Industrial and Commercial Panel at a by-election on 16 June 1950. She lost her seat at the 1951 Seanad election but was re-elected at the 1954 Seanad election and was re-elected at each subsequent election until she retired at the 1969 Seanad election.

She was appointed Labour Party General Secretary on the 28 June 1962. She was the first female General Secretary of any Irish political party.
