= Patrick O'Reilly =

Patrick O'Reilly may refer to:

- Patrick O'Reilly (Independent politician) (1893–1972), Irish independent politician represented Cavan, 1948–1951
- Patrick O'Reilly (Longford politician) (1911–2003), Irish Fianna Fáil politician, member of the Senate, 1944–1969
- Patrick O'Reilly (Cavan politician) (1906–1994), Irish Clann na Talmhan/Fine Gael politician represented Cavan, 1943–1973
- Patrick O'Reilly (priest) (1843–1914), Catholic priest and educationalist
- Patrick J. O'Reilly (actor) (born 1980), Irish actor, director and writer
- Patrick J. O'Reilly (politician) (died 1965), Irish politician, member of the 5th Senate
- Patrick F. O'Reilly, Irish politician, member of the 7th Senate
- Patrick Thomas O'Reilly (1833–1892), Roman Catholic bishop of Springfield, Massachusetts
- Paddy O'Reilly (footballer) (1898–1974), soccer player
- Patrick W. O'Reilly (1925–2020), American lawyer and politician
- Patrick O'Reilly (ethnologist), French priest and ethnologist
