= 2026 Galway West by-election =

By-election to the 34th Dáil

- 22 May 2026
- Turnout: 44.0% ▼14.5 pp
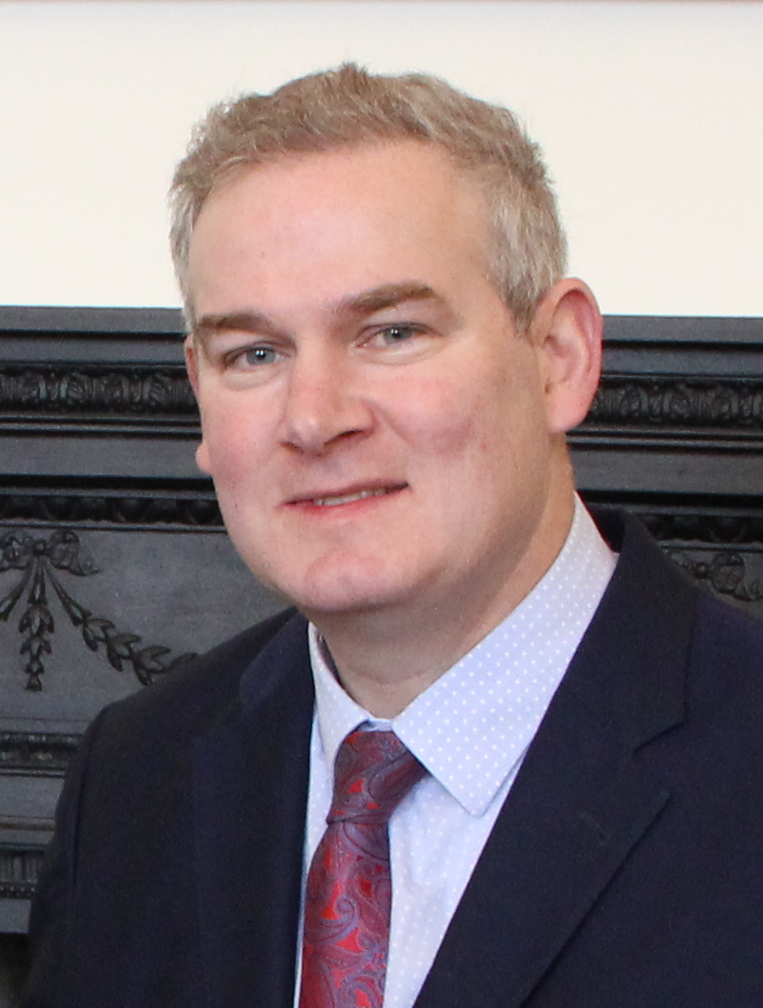
| | | Thomas | Ogbu |
| Nominee | Seán Kyne | Noel Thomas | Helen Ogbu |
| Party | Fine Gael | Independent Ireland | Labour |
| Alliance | | | Vote Left, Transfer Left |
| First preferences | 9,647 | 10,007 | 5,462 |
| Percentage | 20.1% | 20.9% | 11.4% |
| Final count | 19,218 | 16,519 | – |
- First preference votes by electoral division using tally data
TD before election
Catherine Connolly
Independent
TD after election
Seán Kyne
Fine Gael

A Dáil by-election was held in the constituency of Galway West in Ireland on 22 May 2026, to fill the vacancy in the 34th Dáil left by the election of independent Teachta Dála (TD) Catherine Connolly as president of Ireland. It was held on the same day as the 2026 Dublin Central by-election.

The by-election was won by Seán Kyne of Fine Gael. The by-election was only the sixth time in 50 years that a member of a governing political party was victorious. (Note: The most recent by-election victories for government parties have been: Gabrielle McFadden (FG) who held a seat on the death of her sister Nicky McFadden (FG) at the 2014 Longford–Westmeath by-election; Helen McEntee (FG) who held a seat on the death of her father Shane McEntee at the 2013 Meath East by-election; Patrick Nulty (Lab) who gained it after the death of Brian Lenihan (FF) at the 2011 Dublin West by-election; Noel Treacy (FF) who held the seat of party collegauge Johnny Callanan (FF) at the 1982 Galway East by-election; Clement Coughlan (FF) who held the seat on the death of his party colleague Joseph Brennan (in office as Ceann Comhairle) at the 1980 Donegal by-election; and Brendan Halligan (Lab) who gained a seat on the death of Noel Lemass (FF) at the 1976 Dublin South-West by-election.) It was the first gain for Fine Gael from government since the 1973 Monaghan by-election.

== Timing ==
Under Article 12.6.2° of the Constitution of Ireland, a member of either House of the Oireachtas who is elected as president is deemed to have vacated that seat. Connolly was declared elected as president on 25 October 2025. Under the Electoral (Amendment) Act 2011, the writ for the by-election must be issued within six months of the vacancy. The writ of election to fill the vacancy was agreed by the Dáil on 22 April. On the following day, the Minister for Housing, Local Government and Heritage set the election date for 22 May.

== Constituency profile ==
The Dáil constituency of Galway West elects five TDs. It spans the western half of County Galway, taking in Galway city, the Galway Gaeltacht, Oranmore, Oughterard and Clifden. At the 2024 general election, Galway West elected one Sinn Féin, one Fianna Fáil, one Fine Gael and two independent TDs (Catherine Connolly and Noel Grealish).

== Candidates ==
On 28 October 2025, Independent Ireland stated that councillor Noel Thomas, formerly of Fianna Fáil, was selected as their candidate for the by-election. The Green Party selected former councillor Niall Murphy as their candidate on 6 December 2025.

Independent candidates who indicated an intention to stand during January 2026 included independent councillor Thomas Welby, formerly of the Progressive Democrats, and Sheila Garrity, former campaign manager for Catherine Connolly. Local councillor Helen Ogbu was selected as the Labour Party's candidate in January 2026.

In February 2026, the Social Democrats selected Míde Nic Fhionnlaoich (a parliamentary assistant to TD Sinéad Gibney) as its candidate. Aontú selected Orla Nugent as their candidate in February 2026. Senator Seán Kyne was selected as the Fine Gael candidate on 22 February 2026. On 24 February 2026 People Before Profit announced Denman Rooke as their candidate.

Despite speculation about a joint left ticket, Sinn Féin leader Mary Lou McDonald said her party would stand its own candidate, but she reportedly stated that she would like to see a transfer pact between left-wing candidates. On 19 March 2026 the party selected former city councillor and Galway West branch chairperson Mark Lohan as its candidate. On 25 March 2026, Mike Cubbard, an independent councillor and Mayor of Galway since June 2025, declared that he would contest the election. On 29 March 2026, Oranmore-based councillor Cillian Keane was selected as the Fianna Fáil candidate. On 22 April 2026, A.J. Cahill of the Irish People party and Michael Ryan, an independent candidate, both announced their candidacies.

== Campaigning ==
Following the election of Catherine Connolly as president of Ireland, a new Galway-based political group called Tonn na Clé (Left Wave) began promoting a "vote left, transfer left" pact. In March 2026, it was reported that six candidates in Galway West proposed to agree a "Vote Left, Transfer Left" pact. The potential agreement, facilitated by Tonn na Clé, involves candidates from the Labour Party, Sinn Féin, the Green Party, the Social Democrats, People Before Profit, and Garrity, who is an independent.

It was also reported in March 2026 that there would be no Irish language candidate debates on TG4 or Raidió na Gaeltachta as only three candidates — Kyne, Nugent, and Nic Fhionnlaoich — are "sufficiently fluent" in Irish.

Research by the Hope and Courage Collective published in the weeks after the election found that Helen Ogbu had been a target of sustained online harassment, racism and intimidation, including attempts to damage her reputation and challenge her legitimacy as a candidate. Both Sheila Garrity and Denman Rooke were also targeted with claims that they had "no right" to run in the election.

== Debates ==
2026 Galway West by-election debates
| Date | Broadcaster | Moderator | Programme | Participants | | | | | | | | | | | | | | | | |
| P Participant A Absent invitee | | | | Bairéad | Cahill | Cubbard | Feeney | Garrity | Keane | Kyne | Lohan | Murphy | Nic Fhionnlaoich | Nugent | Ogbu | O’Leary | Rooke | Ryan | Thomas | Welby |
|---|---|---|---|---|---|---|---|---|---|---|---|---|---|---|---|---|---|---|---|---|
| 14 April | University of Galway | Gráinne Greene | Lit & Deb | A | A | A | A | P | A | A | P | P | P | A | P | A | P | A | A | A |
| 10 May | RTÉ One | Áine Lawlor | The Week in Politics | A | A | A | A | A | P | P | P | A | A | A | A | A | A | A | P | A |
| 18 May | Galway Bay FM | John Morley | Galway Talks | P | P | P | A | P | P | P | P | P | P | P | P | P | P | P | P | P |

== Opinion polling ==
| Last date of polling | Commissioner | Polling firm | Sample size | Preference | Bairéad | Cahill | Cubbard | Feeney | Garrity | Keane | Kyne | Lohan | Murphy | Nic Fhionnlaoich | Nugent | Ogbu | O'Leary | Rooke | Ryan | Thomas | Welby |
|---|---|---|---|---|---|---|---|---|---|---|---|---|---|---|---|---|---|---|---|---|---|
| 7 May 2026 | TG4; The Irish Times | Ipsos B&A | 530 | First | —N/a | 1 | 7 | —N/a | 3 | 8 | 17 | 7 | 6 | 9 | 4 | 12 | 1 | 2 | 1 | 16 | 6 |
| 7 May 2026 | TG4; The Irish Times | Ipsos B&A | 530 | Second | —N/a | —N/a | 6 | —N/a | —N/a | 9 | 15 | 9 | —N/a | 9 | 6 | 11 | —N/a | —N/a | —N/a | 7 | 14 |

== Result ==
2026 Galway West by-election
| Party | Candidate | FPv% | Count | | | | | | | | | | |
| Party | Candidate | FPv% | 1 | 2 | 3 | 4 | 5 | 6 | 7 | 8 | 9 | 10 | 11 |
|---|---|---|---|---|---|---|---|---|---|---|---|---|---|
| Independent Ireland | Noel Thomas | 20.9 | 10,007 | 10,038 | 10,477 | 10,497 | 11,075 | 12,246 | 12,947 | 13,897 | 14,694 | 15,246 | 16,519 |
| Fine Gael | Seán Kyne | 20.1 | 9,647 | 9,673 | 9,693 | 9,907 | 10,126 | 10,966 | 11,114 | 11,788 | 14,369 | 14,969 | 19,218 |
| Labour | Helen Ogbu | 11.4 | 5,462 | 5,560 | 5,578 | 5,970 | 6,545 | 6,763 | 7,457 | 8,500 | 9,063 | 12,960 | |
| Fianna Fáil | Cillian Keane | 8.8 | 4,192 | 4,201 | 4,226 | 4,259 | 4,401 | 4,668 | 4,749 | 5,154 | | | |
| Independent | Mike Cubbard | 7.1 | 3,396 | 3,440 | 3,524 | 3,595 | 3,908 | 4,140 | 4,737 | | | | |
| Social Democrats | Míde Nic Fhionnlaoich | 7.0 | 3,354 | 3,551 | 3,569 | 3,836 | 4,440 | 4,587 | 5,409 | 5,938 | 6,158 | | |
| Sinn Féin | Mark Lohan | 6.7 | 3,208 | 3,298 | 3,333 | 3,364 | 3,618 | 3,763 | | | | | |
| Independent | Thomas Welby | 6.6 | 3,138 | 3,161 | 3,193 | 3,219 | 3,351 | | | | | | |
| Independent | Sheila Garrity | 3.0 | 1,421 | 1,542 | 1,568 | 1,696 | | | | | | | |
| Green | Niall Murphy | 2.5 | 1,199 | 1,241 | 1,252 | | | | | | | | |
| Aontú | Orla Nugent | 2.4 | 1,167 | 1,194 | 1,368 | 1,397 | | | | | | | |
| The Irish People | A.J. Cahill | 1.9 | 890 | 949 | | | | | | | | | |
| PBP–Solidarity | Denman Rooke | 1.1 | 540 | | | | | | | | | | |
| Independent | Néill Bairéad | 0.2 | 112 | | | | | | | | | | |
| Independent | Michael Ryan | 0.2 | 108 | | | | | | | | | | |
| Independent | Patrick Feeney | 0.1 | 39 | | | | | | | | | | |
| Independent | John O'Leary | 0.0 | 13 | | | | | | | | | | |
Electorate: 109,464 Valid: 47,893 Spoilt: 283 Quota: 23,947 Turnout: 48,176 (44.0%)

The by-election was won by Seán Kyne of Fine Gael. The by-election was only the fourth time in 44 years that a member of a governing political party was victorious, and was the only time of those four occasions it did not follow the death of a standing TD of the same party. The Irish Times characterised Kyne's win as a rare government byelection victory driven more by Seán Kyne's personal reputation and local track record than by party loyalty. Political Correspondent Harry McGee argued that Kyne's long-standing presence across both urban and rural Galway West, alongside his focus on infrastructure and regional projects, helped him avoid the anti-government backlash that often dominates byelections. The Irish Times also noted that weak opposition campaigns, transfer patterns between Fine Gael, Fianna Fáil and Labour voters, and concerns around rival Noel Thomas's links to fuel protests and immigration views all benefited Kyne.
