= 2026 Seanad by-election =

By-election to the 27th Seanad

- 6 November 2026
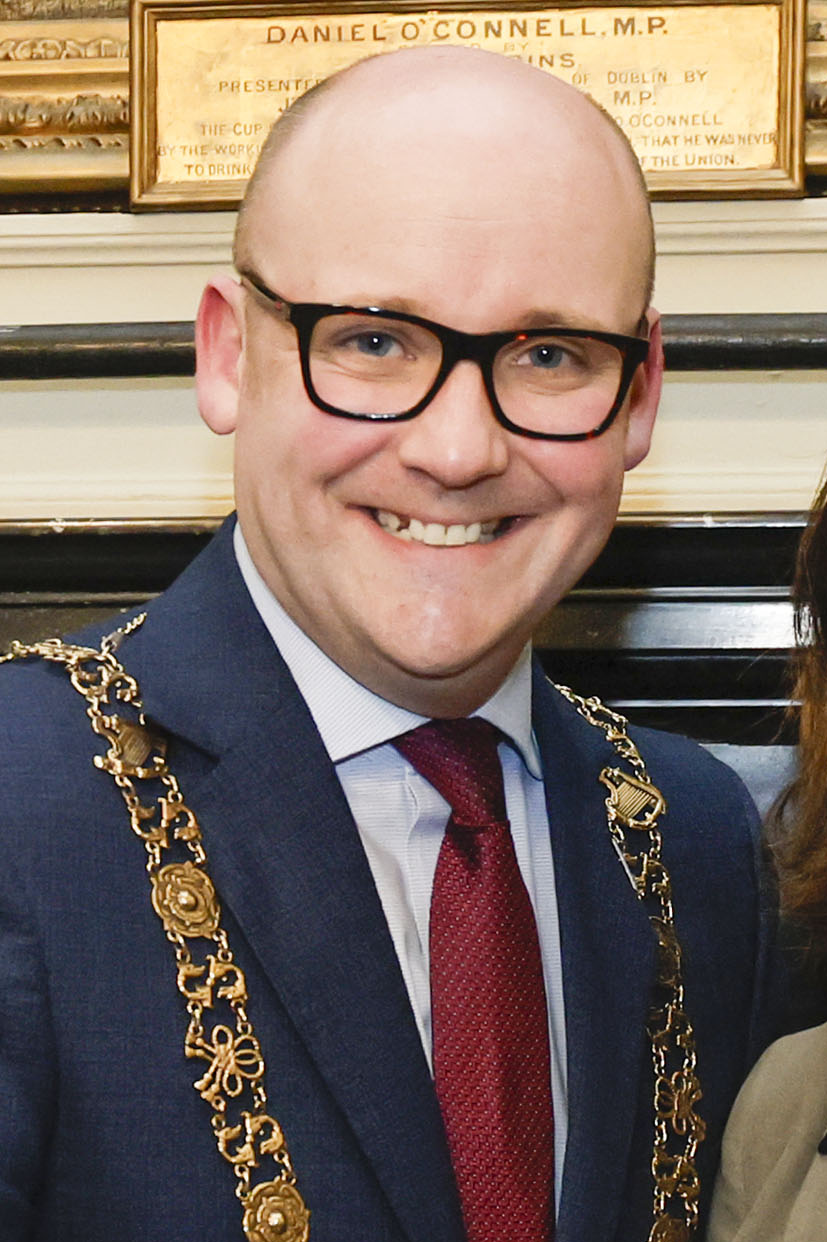

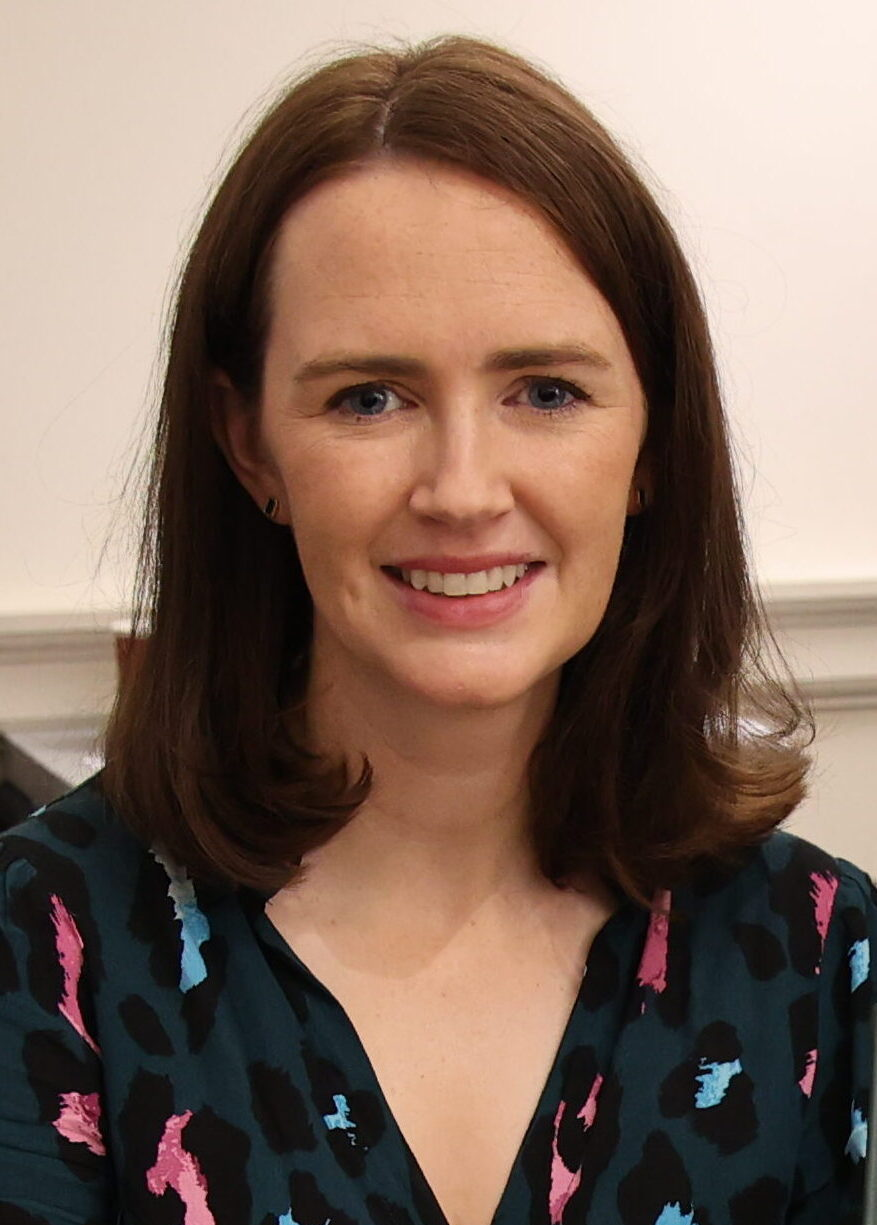
Nominee	Ray McAdam	Maeve O'Rourke
Party	Fine Gael	Independent
First preferences	116,000	52,000
Percentage	52.5	23.5
	Ind	Ind
Nominee	Caitlín Ní Bhroin	Patrick Paul Walsh
Party	Independent	Independent
First preferences	45,000	8,000
Percentage	20.4	3.6
Senator before election
Seán Kyne
Fine Gael
Senator after election
Ray McAdam
Fine Gael

A by-election was held in Ireland for the Cultural and Educational Panel of Seanad Éireann on 6 November 2026. The vacancy was caused by the election of Fine Gael's Seán Kyne to Dáil Éireann at the 2026 Galway West by-election. The election was won by the Fine Gael candidate Ray McAdam.

== Election system ==
The electorate in by-elections to the vocational panels consists of Oireachtas members only. For this election, it consisted of 174 TDs and 59 senators. Seán Kyne was elected from the nominating bodies sub-panel of the Cultural and Educational Panel at the 2025 Seanad election. To be nominated, a candidate must be nominated by an approved nominating body for the Cultural and Educational Panel.

All votes were cast by postal ballot, and were counted using the single transferable vote. Under this system, voters can rank candidates in order of their preference, 1 as their first preference, 2 for second preference, and so on. Ballots are initially given a value of 1,000 to allow calculation of the quota (Droop quota) where all ballots are distributed in the case of a surplus.

== Process and dates ==
As a result of his election to the Dáil, Kyne was deemed to have vacated his Seanad seat on 26 May 2026. A notice of the vacancy was sent to the Minister for Housing, Local Government and Heritage on 22 September 2026. The minister is required to make a Seanad by-election order within 180 days after receiving a notice of a vacancy. On 24 September 2026, Minister James Browne made an order for the by-election which set the following dates:

- 6 October 2026: close of receiving nominations;
- 16 October 2026: ruling on candidate nominations;
- 23 October 2026: issuing of ballot papers;
- 6 November 2026, at 11 a.m.: close of poll.

== Candidates ==
On 27 May 2026, the leaders of the Social Democrats, Holly Cairns, and the Labour Party, Ivana Bacik, wrote to other left wing parties and groups in the Oireachtas in the hopes of agreeing a left unity candidate as had been done in the 2025 presidential election.

On 24 September 2026 Ray McAdam, a Dublin City Councillor and former Lord Mayor, was selected as the Fine Gael candidate, and was nominated by the Genealogical Society of Ireland. On 16 October 2026 the Seanad returning officer finalised the candidate list.

Maeve O'Rourke, a legal academic and lawyer, was supported by the by the Labour Party and the Social Democrats, while running as an independent candidate. She was nominated by the Law Society of Ireland, the Irish Dental Association, and Comhlámh. She is married to Ciarán Ahern, a Labour Party TD.

Caitlín Ní Bhroin is a language planning officer in Cloughaneely, County Donegal and contributor to RTÉ Raidió na Gaeltachta. She is also a board member of Údarás na Gaeltachta, a nominating body for the Cultural and Educational Panel. She received pledges of support from Sinn Féin in advance of the by-election.

Patrick Paul Walsh is a professor of global affairs and sustainable futures at University College Dublin, and was nominated by the Irish Federation of University Teachers.

== Result ==
2026 Seanad by-election: Cultural and Educational Panel
Party	Candidate	FPv%	Count
Party	Candidate	FPv%	1
Fine Gael	Ray McAdam	52.5	116,000
Independent	Maeve O'Rourke	23.5	52,000
Independent	Caitlín Ní Bhroin	20.4	45,000
Independent	Patrick Paul Walsh	3.6	8,000
Electorate: 233,000 (Note: To facilitate transfer of fractional surpluses, each valid ballot paper is given a value of 1,000.) Valid: 221,000 Quota: 110,501 Turnout: 94.8%

Notes

McAdam was elected on the first count having exceeded the quota.
