= Metropolitan Arts Centre =

Arts centre in Belfast, Northern Ireland

- Established: 20 April 2012
- Location: Belfast, Northern Ireland
- Coordinates: 54°36′13″N 5°55′39″W
- Type: Arts centre
- Public transit access: Belfast Central and Yorkgate stations
- Parking: Saint Anne's Square
- Website: themaclive.com

The Metropolitan Arts Centre, usually referred to as the MAC, is a multi-arts venue on St Anne's Square in the Cathedral Quarter of Belfast, Northern Ireland. It opened in April 2012 to replace the Old Museum Arts Centre (OMAC) and contains three galleries, two theatres, a dance studio and education and workshop spaces. Its programme covers visual art, theatre, dance and music.

The building was designed by Hackett Hall McKnight and won a 2013 RIBA National Architecture Award. The MAC is operated by The MAC (Metropolitan Arts Centre), a registered charity and company limited by guarantee that was incorporated in 1989 as the Old Museum Arts Centre. By 2023 it had received more than 2.5 million visitors, and it was shortlisted for the Art Fund's Museum of the Year prize in 2015 and 2023.

== History ==
=== Old Museum Arts Centre ===
In 1989, the centre was opened as the Old Museum Arts Centre. The company that ran it was incorporated on 26 July 1989. The Old Museum is a Grade A listed building of the Belfast Natural History Society. Two decades later, the building needed a renovation and its limitations, such as the lack of accessibility for wheelchair users, prompted the OMAC to build anew.

The last theatre production in the old building was performed at the end of 2009. The Weein, a play by Patrick J. O'Reilly, starred amongst others Kerri Quinn. At the end of January 2010 the OMAC closed its doors. The company was renamed The MAC (Metropolitan Arts Centre) on 20 September 2010.

=== Construction and opening ===
In December 2009 the culture minister, Nelson McCausland, announced the start of construction of an £18 million arts centre on St Anne's Square, to be delivered and managed by the OMAC trustees. The Department for Culture, Arts and Leisure contributed £10.76 million. The Department for Social Development, the Arts Council of Northern Ireland, the OMAC and Belfast City Council also contributed. The architects were chosen through a design competition run by the OMAC and the Royal Institute of British Architects. Anne McReynolds, formerly of the OMAC, oversaw the project from concept to completion.

The MAC held its official launch on 19 April 2012, attended by the culture minister, Carál Ní Chuilín. The opening programme included Titanic (Scenes from the British Wreck Commissioner's Enquiry, 1912), a play by Owen McCafferty, and an exhibition of work by L. S. Lowry shown alongside paintings by William Conor.

== Architecture ==
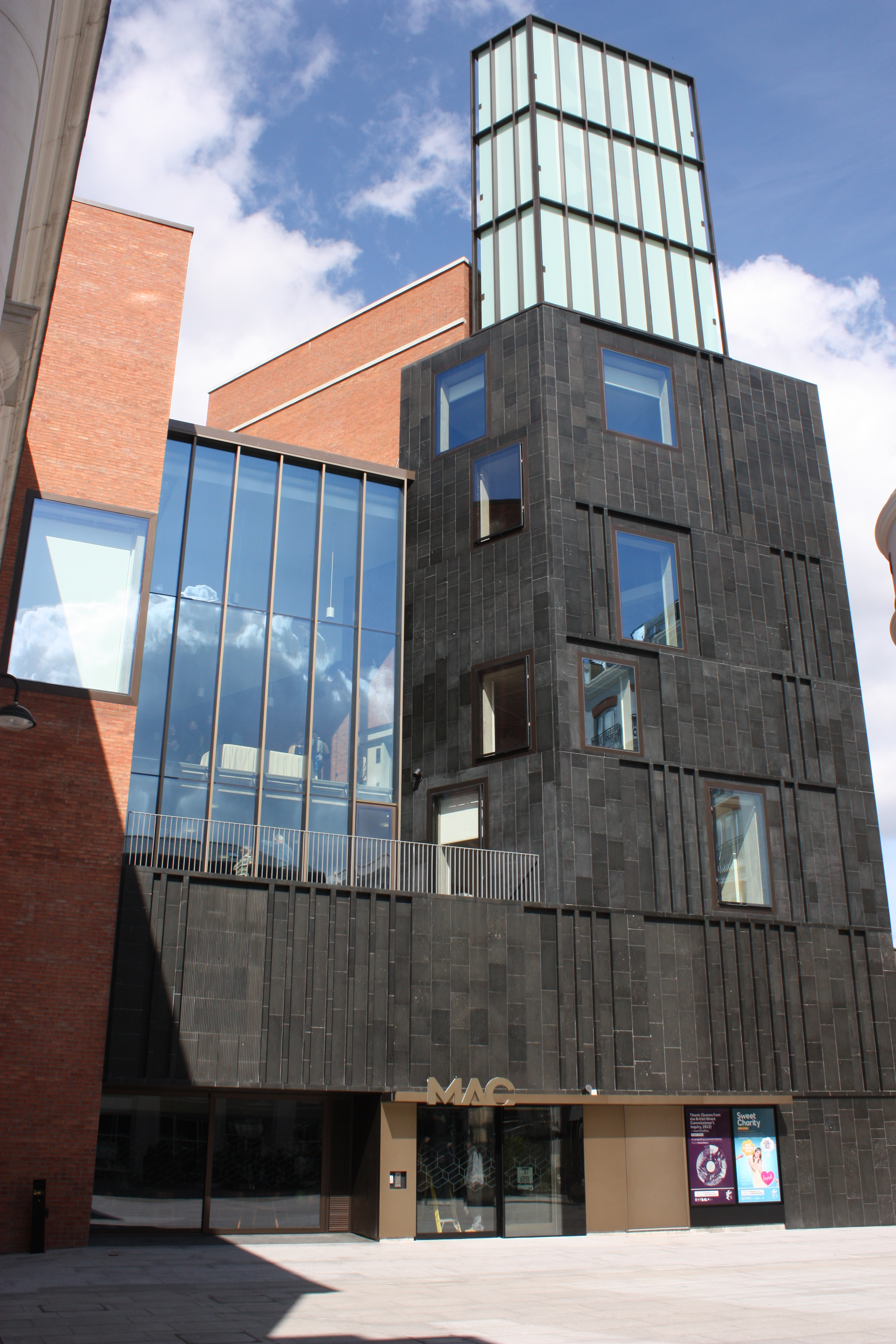
The MAC from St Anne's Square

Designed by Belfast-based architectural practice Hackett Hall McKnight, the MAC sits on a roughly trapezium-shaped site opposite St Anne's Cathedral, between two existing buildings. It completes the newly created St Anne's Square. The building, completed in February 2012, consists of a number of intersecting brick volumes and a basalt tower topped with three stories of glazing.

A long, narrow atrium divides the building into two halves and rises through seven storeys. The two halves are brick-clad blocks of in-situ concrete, with the galleries stacked above the theatres, and the tower is clad in local basalt. Inside, the atrium walls are exposed concrete and brick, with terrazzo floors. The building was rated BREEAM "Excellent". The architects said the design drew on Belfast's brick warehouse and mill buildings.

The project won a 2013 RIBA National Award and was awarded the 2014 Downes Medal by the Architectural Association of Ireland. It also won the Supreme Award and the Public Building prize at the Brick Development Association's 2012 Brick Awards.

== Facilities ==
The building has two theatres, seating 350 and 120, and about 1,000 square metres of gallery space. It also contains a dance studio, rehearsal space, eight education and workshop spaces, a café and bar, offices for resident arts organisations and an artist-in-residence studio.

== Recognition ==
The MAC was one of five venues shortlisted for the Art Fund's Museum of the Year prize in 2015, when the prize was worth £100,000. The Art Fund said that the MAC "presented an outstanding programme in 2014 and established itself as a world-class attraction". In 2023 it was one of five finalists for the prize, alongside the Burrell Collection, Leighton House, the Natural History Museum and Scapa Flow Museum, and it was shortlisted in the Best Medium Museum category of the Family Friendly Museum Award. Architectural awards are listed under Architecture.

== Programme ==
The MAC commissions new work and presents theatre, dance, music and visual art. Some of its spaces are available for commercial hire.

=== Visual art ===
Exhibitions have included Andy Warhol (8 February to 28 April 2013), which Belfast Media described as the first major Warhol exhibition in Northern Ireland. Curator Hugh Mulholland said it contained about 100 works from Tate's ARTIST ROOMS On Tour scheme, filling all three galleries, and admission was free. David Hockney: I draw, I do (19 August to 16 October 2016) showed Hockney's student work of the 1950s alongside recent iPad portraits; the MAC described it as the first significant presentation of Hockney's work in Ireland. A Ron Mueck exhibition opened on 29 July 2022.

The MAC also runs an international art prize, the MAC International, worth £20,000. The 2016 prize, sponsored by Ulster Bank, went to Jasmina Cibic from a shortlist of 18 artists chosen from almost 1,000 entries from 40 countries. The 2018 prize went to Nikolaus Gansterer.

== Visitors and funding ==
The MAC reported about 1.5 million visitors in its first five years, and that 133,432 people from schools and community organisations had taken part in its programmes. The Museums Association reported in 2023 that the total had passed 2.5 million. The galleries reopened in late May 2021 after five months of closure during the COVID-19 pandemic.

The MAC is registered with the Charity Commission for Northern Ireland. The Arts Council of Northern Ireland is a significant funder, and at its opening the centre was reported to receive funding from the Arts Council, the National Lottery and charitable and government sources.

== The Permanent Present ==
The MAC has a single permanent artwork: The Permanent Present by Irish artist Mark Garry. The work was jointly commissioned by the MAC and The Thomas Devlin Fund, a charity set up in memory of murdered teenager Thomas Devlin, and consists of 400 copper strands in a spectrum of colours reaching from a high window down to the first floor. Anne McReynolds, Chief Executive of the MAC, said the aim was "to commission an artwork that would comment on The Thomas Devlin Fund's commitment to highlighting the futility of violence as well as the hopes and aspirations of our young people", and artist Mark Garry stated that he "wanted to create a work that is positive and hopeful".

== See also ==
- Culture of Belfast
