= 16th Seanad =

Members of the Seanad from 1982 to 1983

←	15th Seanad	17th Seanad	→

Overview
- Legislative body: Seanad Éireann
- Jurisdiction: Ireland
- Meeting place: Leinster House
- Term: 13 May 1982 – 21 December 1982
- Government: 18th government of Ireland
- Members: 60
- Cathaoirleach: Tras Honan (FF)
- Leas-Chathaoirleach: Charles McDonald (FG)
- Leader of the Seanad: Eoin Ryan (FF)

The 16th Seanad was in office from 1982 to 1983. An election to Seanad Éireann, the senate of the Oireachtas (Irish parliament), followed the February 1982 general election to the 23rd Dáil. The senators served until the close of poll for the 17th Seanad.

== Cathaoirleach ==
On 13 May 1982, Tras Honan (FF) was proposed as Cathaoirleach by Eoin Ryan (FF) and seconded by Séamus de Brún (FF). She was elected without a division. Honan was the first female Cathaoirleach of the Seanad.

On 19 May 1982, Charles McDonald (FG) was proposed as Leas-Chathaoirleach by James Dooge (FG) and seconded by Patrick J. Reynolds (FG). He was elected without a division.

== Composition of the 16th Seanad ==
There are a total of 60 seats in the Seanad: 43 were elected on five vocational panels, 6 were elected from two university constituencies and 11 were nominated by the Taoiseach.

The following table shows the composition by party when the 16th Seanad first met on 13 May 1982.

Origin Party	Vocational panels					NUI	DU	Nominated	Total
Origin Party	Admin	Agri	Cult & Educ	Ind & Comm	Labour	NUI	DU	Nominated	Total
Fianna Fáil	4	5	2	4	5	0	0	8	28
Fine Gael	2	5	2	4	5	1	0	0	19
Labour Party	1	1	1	1	1	0	1	0	6
Independent	0	0	0	0	0	2	2	3	7
Total	7	11	5	9	11	3	3	11	60

== List of senators ==
- Note: The entries for Senators who were elected or appointed to fill vacancies are shown in italics

Name	Panel	Party	Notes
Luke Belton	Administrative Panel	Fine Gael	
Katharine Bulbulia	Administrative Panel	Fine Gael	
Sean Conway	Administrative Panel	Fianna Fáil	
Micheál Cranitch	Administrative Panel	Fianna Fáil	
Tras Honan	Administrative Panel	Fianna Fáil	
Billy Kenneally	Administrative Panel	Fianna Fáil	
Flor O'Mahony	Administrative Panel	Labour	
Bernard Durkan	Agricultural Panel	Fine Gael	Elected to 24th Dáil at general election on 24 November 1982
Michael Ferris	Agricultural Panel	Labour	
Tom Fitzgerald	Agricultural Panel	Fianna Fáil	
Richard Hourigan	Agricultural Panel	Fine Gael	
Thomas Hussey	Agricultural Panel	Fianna Fáil	
Joseph Lennon	Agricultural Panel	Fine Gael	
John Mannion	Agricultural Panel	Fine Gael	
Charles McDonald	Agricultural Panel	Fine Gael	
Martin O'Toole	Agricultural Panel	Fianna Fáil	
William Ryan	Agricultural Panel	Fianna Fáil	
Michael Smith	Agricultural Panel	Fianna Fáil	
Séamus de Brún	Cultural and Educational Panel	Fianna Fáil	
Joachim Loughrey	Cultural and Educational Panel	Fine Gael	
Timothy McAuliffe	Cultural and Educational Panel	Labour	
Mary O'Rourke	Cultural and Educational Panel	Fianna Fáil	Elected to 24th Dáil at general election on 24 November 1982
Madeleine Taylor	Cultural and Educational Panel	Fine Gael	Elected to 24th Dáil at general election on 24 November 1982
Deirdre Bolger	Industrial and Commercial Panel	Fine Gael	
Timmy Conway	Industrial and Commercial Panel	Labour	
Jack Daly	Industrial and Commercial Panel	Fine Gael	
Seán Fallon	Industrial and Commercial Panel	Fianna Fáil	
Willie Farrell	Industrial and Commercial Panel	Fianna Fáil	
Michael Howard	Industrial and Commercial Panel	Fine Gael	
Mick Lanigan	Industrial and Commercial Panel	Fianna Fáil	
Patrick J. Reynolds	Industrial and Commercial Panel	Fine Gael	
Eoin Ryan	Industrial and Commercial Panel	Fianna Fáil	
Monica Barnes	Labour Panel	Fine Gael	Elected to 24th Dáil at general election on 24 November 1982
Toddie Byrne	Labour Panel	Fine Gael	
Donie Cassidy	Labour Panel	Fianna Fáil	
Denis Cregan	Labour Panel	Fine Gael	
Dick Dowling	Labour Panel	Fine Gael	Elected to 24th Dáil at general election on 24 November 1982
Des Hanafin	Labour Panel	Fianna Fáil	
Jack Harte	Labour Panel	Labour	
Tony Herbert	Labour Panel	Fianna Fáil	
Mark Killilea	Labour Panel	Fianna Fáil	
Brian Mullooly	Labour Panel	Fianna Fáil	
Maurice O'Connell	Labour Panel	Fine Gael	
James Dooge	National University of Ireland	Fine Gael	
John A. Murphy	National University of Ireland	Independent	
Brendan Ryan	National University of Ireland	Independent	
Mary Robinson	Dublin University	Labour	
Shane Ross	Dublin University	Independent	
Trevor West	Dublin University	Independent	
Paudge Brennan	Nominated by the Taoiseach	Fianna Fáil	Elected to 24th Dáil at general election on 24 November 1982
Flor Crowley	Nominated by the Taoiseach	Fianna Fáil	
Aidan Eames	Nominated by the Taoiseach	Fianna Fáil	Nominated on 13 December 1982 to fill vacancy after the general election
Camilla Hannon	Nominated by the Taoiseach	Fianna Fáil	
James Larkin	Nominated by the Taoiseach	Independent Fianna Fáil	
Seamus Mallon	Nominated by the Taoiseach	Independent	Deputy Leader of the Social Democratic and Labour Party
P. J. Mara	Nominated by the Taoiseach	Fianna Fáil	
Bernard McGlinchey	Nominated by the Taoiseach	Fianna Fáil	
M. J. Nolan	Nominated by the Taoiseach	Fianna Fáil	Elected to 24th Dáil at general election on 24 November 1982
Seán O'Connor	Nominated by the Taoiseach	Fianna Fáil	Nominated on 13 December 1982 to fill vacancy after the general election
Ned O'Keeffe	Nominated by the Taoiseach	Fianna Fáil	Elected to 24th Dáil at general election on 24 November 1982
John Robb	Nominated by the Taoiseach	Independent	
Frank Wall	Nominated by the Taoiseach	Fianna Fáil	Nominated on 13 December 1982 to fill vacancy after the general election
G. V. Wright	Nominated by the Taoiseach	Fianna Fáil	

== Changes ==
Date	Panel	Loss	Gain	Note
24 November 1982	Agricultural Panel	Fine Gael		Bernard Durkan elected to 24th Dáil at general election
24 November 1982	Cultural and Educational Panel	Fianna Fáil		Mary O'Rourke elected to 24th Dáil at general election
24 November 1982	Cultural and Educational Panel	Fine Gael		Madeleine Taylor elected to 24th Dáil at general election
24 November 1982	Labour Panel	Fine Gael		Monica Barnes elected to 24th Dáil at general election
24 November 1982	Labour Panel	Fine Gael		Dick Dowling elected to 24th Dáil at general election
24 November 1982	Nominated by the Taoiseach	Fianna Fáil		Paudge Brennan elected to 24th Dáil at general election
24 November 1982	Nominated by the Taoiseach	Fianna Fáil		M. J. Nolan elected to 24th Dáil at general election
24 November 1982	Nominated by the Taoiseach	Fianna Fáil		Ned O'Keeffe elected to 24th Dáil at general election
13 December 1982	Nominated by the Taoiseach		Fianna Fáil	Aidan Eames nominated to fill vacancy after the general election
13 December 1982	Nominated by the Taoiseach		Fianna Fáil	Seán O'Connor nominated to fill vacancy after the general election
13 December 1982	Nominated by the Taoiseach		Fianna Fáil	Frank Wall nominated to fill vacancy after the general election
