= Patrick Doyle (disambiguation) =

Patrick Doyle (born 1953) is a Scottish composer.

Patrick Doyle may also refer to:

- Patrick Doyle (businessman) (1777–1857), delegate to the Newfoundland House of Assembly
- Patrick Doyle (Irish republican) (1892–1921), IRA member
- Patrick Doyle (Irish politician) (died 1964), Irish Fine Gael Senator
- J. Patrick Doyle (born 1963), CEO of Domino's Pizza
- Patrick Doyle (Nigerian actor) Nigerian veteran actor
