= Cultural and Educational Panel =

Seanad Éireann constituency

- Seanad Éireann constituency

Current constituency
- Created: 1938
- Seats: 5
- Senators: Cathal Byrne (FG); Joe Conway (Ind); Shane Curley (FF); Ray McAdam (FG); Pauline Tully (SF)

The Cultural and Educational Panel is one of five vocational panels which together elect 43 of the 60 members of Seanad Éireann, the senate of the Oireachtas (the legislature of Ireland). The Cultural and Educational Panel elects five senators.

== Election ==
Article 18 of the Constitution of Ireland provides that 43 of the 60 senators are to be elected from five vocational panels. The Cultural and Educational Panel is defined in Article 18.7.1° (i) as "National Language and Culture, Literature, Art, Education and such professional interests as may be defined by law for the purpose of this panel". The Seanad returning officer maintains a list of nominating bodies for each of the five panels. Candidates may be nominated either by four members of the Oireachtas or by a nominating body. The electorate consists of city and county councillors and current members of the Oireachtas. As the Seanad election takes place after the election to the Dáil, the Oireachtas members are the members of the incoming Dáil and the outgoing Seanad. Five senators are elected on the Cultural and Educational Panel, at least two of whom must have been nominated by Oireachtas members and at least two must have been nominated by nominating bodies.

== Senators ==
Senators for the Cultural and Educational Panel
Key to parties: FF = Fianna Fáil; FG = Fine Gael; Lab = Labour; SF = Sinn Féin; Ind. = Independent
Sen	Election	Senator (Party)	Senator (Party)	Senator (Party)	Senator (Party)	Senator (Party)
2nd	1938	Séamus Ó hEocha (Ind.)	Seán O'Donovan (FF)	Gearóid O'Sullivan (FG)	Patrick Doyle (FG)	James Parkinson (Note: Resigned on 31 July 1947 due to ill-health.) (FG)
3rd	1938	Thomas Delany (Note: Died on 9 July 1939.) (Ind.)	Seán O'Donovan (FF)	James Crosbie (FG)	Patrick Doyle (FG)	James Parkinson (FG)
3rd	1941	Thomas J. O'Connell (Note: Elected to the Seanad at a by-election on 22 January 1941, replacing Thomas Delany.) (Lab)	Seán O'Donovan (FF)	James Crosbie (FG)	Patrick Doyle (FG)	James Parkinson (FG)
4th	1943	Thomas J. O'Connell (Lab)	Seán O'Donovan (FF)	Donal O'Sullivan (Ind.)	Patrick Doyle (FG)	James Parkinson (FG)
5th	1944	Patrick J. O'Reilly (Ind.)	Seán O'Donovan (FF)	Louis O'Dea (FF)	Patrick Doyle (FG)	James Parkinson (FG)
6th	1948	Thomas J. O'Connell (Lab)	Liam Ó Buachalla (FF)	Frank Loughman (FF)	Cecil Lavery (Note: Appointed as a judge of the Supreme Court on 21 April 1950.) (FG)	Michael Hayes (FG)
7th	1951	Patrick F. O'Reilly (Ind.)	Liam Ó Buachalla (FF)	Frank Loughman (FF)	James B. Lynch (Note: Died on 12 March 1954.) (FF)	Michael Hayes (FG)
8th	1954	Thomas J. O'Connell (Lab)	Liam Ó Buachalla (FF)	Eamon Kissane (FF)	Michael ffrench-O'Carroll (Ind.)	James Crosbie (FG)
9th	1957	Anthony Barry (FG)	Liam Ó Buachalla (FF)	Eamon Kissane (FF)	John O'Donovan (FG)	Michael Hayes (FG)
10th	1961	Timothy McAuliffe (Lab)	Liam Ó Buachalla (FF)	Eamon Kissane (FF)	John J. Nash (FF)	Michael Hayes (FG)
11th	1965	Timothy McAuliffe (Lab)	Liam Ó Buachalla (FF)	Michael O'Kennedy (FF)	John J. Nash (FF)	Ben O'Quigley (Note: Died on 29 May 1969.) (FG)
12th	1969	John Kelly (FG)	Kit Ahern (FF)	Michael Yeats (FF)	John J. Nash (FF)	Michael O'Higgins (FG)
13th	1973	Timothy McAuliffe (Lab)	Kit Ahern (FF)	Michael Yeats (FF)	Billy Fox (Note: Assassinated on 12 March 1974.) (FG)	Mary Walsh (Note: Died on 18 August 1976.) (FG)
13th	1975	Timothy McAuliffe (Lab)	Kit Ahern (FF)	Michael Yeats (FF)	Roddy Connolly (Note: Elected to the Seanad at a by-election on 23 April 1975, replacing Billy Fox.) (Lab)	Mary Walsh (FG)
13th	1976	Timothy McAuliffe (Lab)	Kit Ahern (FF)	Michael Yeats (FF)	Roddy Connolly (Lab)	Vincent McHugh (Note: Elected to the Seanad at a by-election on 25 October 1976, replacing Mary Walsh.) (FG)
14th	1977	Timothy McAuliffe (Lab)	Richard Conroy (FF)	Flor Crowley (FF)	Patrick Cooney (FG)	David Molony (FG)
15th	1981	Timothy McAuliffe (Lab)	Mary O'Rourke (FF)	Joe Walsh (FF)	Patsy Lawlor (FG)	Maurice Manning (FG)
16th	1982	Timothy McAuliffe (Lab)	Mary O'Rourke (FF)	Séamus de Brún (FF)	Joachim Loughrey (FG)	Madeleine Taylor (FG)
17th	1983	Helena McAuliffe-Ennis (Note: Joined the Progressive Democrats in 1986.) (Lab)	Michael Smith (FF)	Séamus de Brún (FF)	Joachim Loughrey (FG)	Brian Fleming (FG)
18th	1987	Seán Byrne (FF)	Tony McKenna (FF)	Paschal Mooney (FF)	Joachim Loughrey (FG)	Maurice Manning (FG)
19th	1989	Seán Byrne (FF)	Éamon Ó Cuív (FF)	Paschal Mooney (FF)	Joe O'Reilly (FG)	Maurice Manning (FG)
20th	1993	Madeleine Taylor-Quinn (FG)	Ann Ormonde (FF)	Paschal Mooney (FF)	Mary Kelly (Lab)	Maurice Manning (FG)
21st	1997	Madeleine Taylor-Quinn (FG)	Ann Ormonde (FF)	Paschal Mooney (FF)	Labhrás Ó Murchú (Note: Resigned the Fianna Fáil whip on 7 July 2010, rejoining on 23 November 2010.) (FF)	Maurice Manning (FG)
22nd	2002	Noel Coonan (FG)	Ann Ormonde (FF)	Paschal Mooney (FF)	Labhrás Ó Murchú (FF)	Brian Hayes (FG)
23rd	2007	Alex White (Lab)	Ann Ormonde (FF)	Cecilia Keaveney (FF)	Labhrás Ó Murchú (FF)	Liam Twomey (FG)
24th	2011	John Gilroy (Lab)	Thomas Byrne (FF)	Deirdre Clune (Note: Elected to the European Parliament in May 2014.) (FG)	Labhrás Ó Murchú (FF)	Michael Mullins (FG)
24th	2014	John Gilroy (Lab)	Thomas Byrne (FF)	Gerard Craughwell (Note: Elected in a by-election on 10 October 2014, replacing Deirdre Clune.) (Ind.)	Labhrás Ó Murchú (FF)	Michael Mullins (FG)
25th	2016	Fintan Warfield (SF)	Lorraine Clifford-Lee (FF)	Keith Swanick (FF)	Gabrielle McFadden (FG)	Kieran O'Donnell (Note: Elected to the Dáil on 8 February 2020.) (FG)
26th	2020	Fintan Warfield (SF)	Malcolm Byrne (FF)	Lisa Chambers (FF)	Seán Kyne (Note: Elected to the Dáil on 22 May 2026.) (FG)	John McGahon (FG)
27th	2025	Pauline Tully (SF)	Shane Curley (FF)	Joe Conway (Ind.)	Seán Kyne (FG)	Cathal Byrne (FG)
27th	2026	Pauline Tully (SF)	Shane Curley (FF)	Joe Conway (Ind.)	Ray McAdam (Note: Elected to the Seanad at a by-election on 6 November 2026, replacing Seán Kyne.) (FG)	Cathal Byrne (FG)

Note: The columns in this table are used only for presentational purposes, and no significance should be attached to the order of columns.

== List of nominating bodies ==
The following bodies are on the register of nominating bodies maintained by the Seanad Returning Officer for the Cultural and Educational Panel:

- Association of Secondary Teachers, Ireland (ASTI)
- Comhaltas Ceoltóirí Éireann
- Comhlámh
- Conradh na Gaeilge
- Bar Council of Ireland
- Dental Council of Ireland
- Drama League of Ireland
- Education and Training Boards Ireland
- Gael Linn
- Gaeloideachas
- Genealogical Society of Ireland
- Institute of Community Health Nursing
- Institute of Guidance Counsellors
- Irish Countrywomen's Association
- Irish Dental Association
- Irish Federation of University Teachers
- Irish Georgian Society
- Irish National Teachers' Organisation
- Law Society of Ireland
- Library Association of Ireland
- Local Authority Medical Specialists
- National Youth Council of Ireland
- Old Dublin Society
- Royal College of Physicians of Ireland
- Royal College of Surgeons in Ireland
- Royal Irish Academy
- Royal Irish Academy of Music
- Royal Society of Antiquaries of Ireland
- Teachers' Union of Ireland
- Theatre Forum
- Údarás na Gaeltachta
- Veterinary Council
- Visual Artists Ireland
- Writers' Guild of Ireland
