= Senator McFadden =

Senator McFadden may refer to:

- Gabrielle McFadden (fl. 2010s–present), Senate of Ireland
- Nathaniel J. McFadden (born 1946), Maryland State Senate
