= Frank Walls =

Frank Walls may refer to:

- Frank Walls (illustrator) (born 1973), American illustrator and game designer
- Frank A. Walls (1967–2025), American serial killer

== See also ==
- Frank Wall (disambiguation)
