= Seán Kyne =

Irish politician (born 1975)

Seán Kyne TD
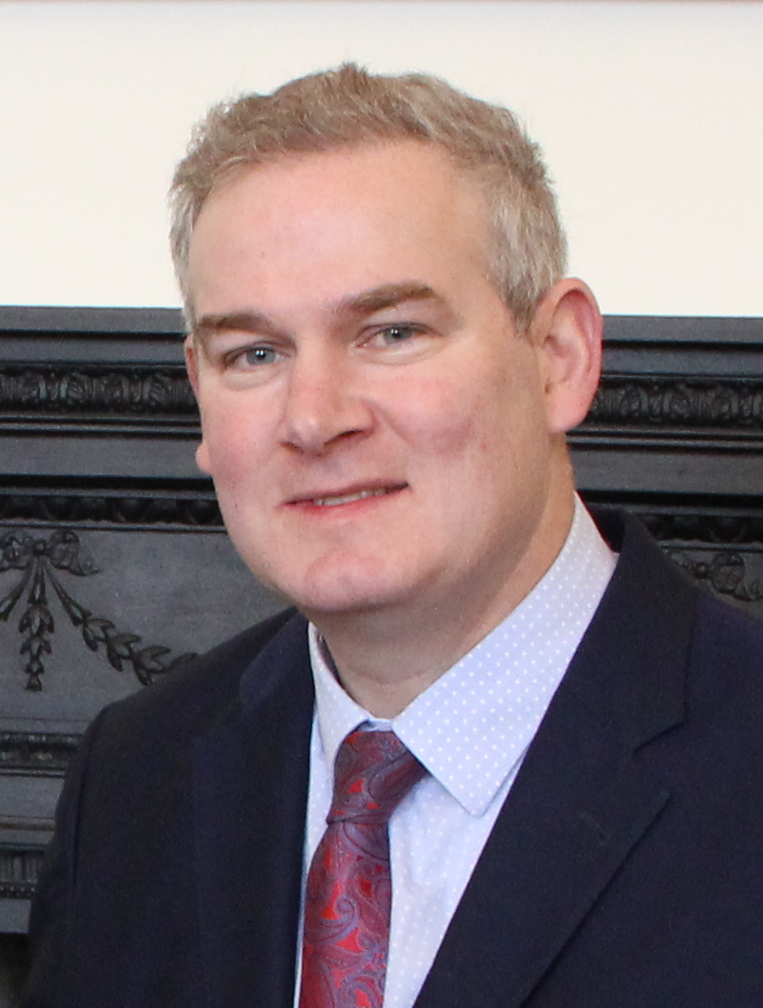
- Kyne in 2025

Teachta Dála
- Incumbent
- Assumed office May 2026
- In office February 2011 – February 2020
- Constituency: Galway West

Leader of the Seanad
- In office 12 February 2025 – 24 May 2026
- Taoiseach: Micheál Martin
- Deputy: Fiona O'Loughlin
- Preceded by: Lisa Chambers
- Succeeded by: Garret Ahearn

Deputy leader of the Seanad
- In office 26 June 2024 – 12 February 2025
- Taoiseach: Simon Harris
- Leader: Lisa Chambers
- Preceded by: Regina Doherty
- Succeeded by: Fiona O'Loughlin

Leader of Fine Gael in the Seanad
- In office 26 June 2024 – 24 May 2026
- Leader: Simon Harris
- Preceded by: Regina Doherty
- Succeeded by: Garret Ahearn

Senator
- In office 29 June 2020 – 24 May 2026
- Constituency: Cultural and Educational Panel
- In office 20 February 2020 – 29 June 2020
- Constituency: Nominated by the Taoiseach

Minister of State
- 2018–2020: Government Chief Whip
- 2018–2020: Culture, Heritage and the Gaeltacht
- 2017–2018: Rural and Community Development
- 2016–2018: Communications, Climate Action and Environment
- 2016–2017: Arts, Heritage, Regional, Rural and Gaeltacht Affairs

Personal details
- Born: 16 May 1975 (age 51) Moycullen, County Galway, Ireland
- Party: Fine Gael
- Spouse: Avril Horan (m. 2014)
- Education: NUI Galway; University College Dublin
- Website: seankyne.ie

Seán Kyne (born 16 May 1975) is an Irish Fine Gael politician who has been a Teachta Dála (TD) for the Galway West constituency since the 2026 Galway West by-election, previously serving as a TD for the same constituency from 2011 to 2020. He served as a senator for the Cultural and Educational Panel from March 2020 to May 2026, and also from February 2020 to March 2020, after being nominated by the Taoiseach. He served as a Minister of State from 2016 to 2020, including as Government Chief Whip from 2018 to 2020.

== Early life and career ==
Kyne is from Moycullen, County Galway. He attended St Mary's College, Galway, then NUI Galway and University College Dublin, studying agricultural science in both (primary degree in Galway and master's degree in Dublin).

He worked for over a decade as an agri-environmental consultant, especially working with the REPS scheme.

== Politics ==
At the 2004 local elections, Kyne was elected to Galway County Council for the Connemara local electoral area. He was re-elected to Galway County Council in 2009, having unsuccessfully contested Galway West at the 2007 general election. He was also unsuccessful at the 2007 election to the 23rd Seanad, when he stood for the Agricultural Panel.

His election in Galway West was the last result to be declared at the 2011 general election. Kyne was ahead of Independent candidate Catherine Connolly by a margin of 17 votes. Connolly sought a full recount, which concluded after a total of four days of counting but did not change the outcome. His victory gave Fine Gael two seats in Galway West for the first time since 1982. He was re-elected at the 2016 general election.

On 19 May 2016, he was appointed as Minister of State with responsibility for Gaeltacht Affairs and Natural Resources by the new minority government of Fine Gael and Independents led by Enda Kenny. He served until Kenny resigned as Taoiseach on 14 June 2017.

On 20 June 2017, he was appointed as Minister of State for Natural Resources, Community Affairs and Digital Development by the minority government led by Leo Varadkar. Following a cabinet reshuffle on 11 October 2018, he was appointed by the government as Government Chief Whip and Minister of State for Gaeilge, the Gaeltacht and the Islands. As Minister he introduced the Official Language (Amendment) Act 2021. This Act sets out that by the end of 2030, 20% of Irish public servants will be competent in the Irish language. As the Government Chief Whip, he oversaw the passage of 54 pieces of legislation in 2019, one of the highest annual legislative outputs in that decade.

He lost his seat at the 2020 general election. He was nominated to the Seanad by Taoiseach Leo Varadkar, to fill a vacancy caused by the election of Frank Feighan to the Dáil. On 31 March 2020, Kyne was elected to Seanad Éireann at the 2020 election on the Cultural and Educational Panel. He continued to serve as Minister of State until the formation of a new government on 27 June 2020.

On 26 June 2024, Kyne was appointed leader of the Fine Gael Seanad group and as deputy Seanad leader by Taoiseach Simon Harris, following Regina Doherty's election as an MEP.

On 12 February 2025, Kyne was appointed Leader of the Seanad by the Taoiseach on recommendation of the Tánaiste Simon Harris, becoming the first officeholder from Galway. On his appointment, Kyne set out his intention as Seanad Leader to focus "on several areas, including increasing the use of and visibility of An Ghaeilge, both in the Seanad and Irish society."

On 22 February 2026, Kyne was selected to contest the 2026 Galway West by-election. Having placed second on first preferences, he secured the seat on the 11th count, after winning over 4,200 transfers from the eliminated Labour Party candidate, allowing him to pass the Independent Ireland candidate Noel Thomas. His re-election to Dáil Éireann subsequently triggered a further by-election to fill his vacated seat in Seanad Éireann, which was subsequently won by his party colleague, Ray McAdam.

=== Electoral results ===
Elections to Galway County Council
Party	Election		FPv	FPv%	Result
Fine Gael	Connemara	2004	864	5.18	Elected on count 16/16
Fine Gael	Connemara	2009	1,927	11.70	Elected on count 2/8

Elections to the Dáil
Party	Election		FPv	FPv%	Result
Fine Gael	Galway West	2007	1,912	3.5	Eliminated on count 6/13
Fine Gael	Galway West	2011	4,550	7.5	Elected on count 13/13
Fine Gael	Galway West	2016	6,136	9.5	Elected on count 14/14
Fine Gael	Galway West	2020	5,284	8.8	Eliminated on count 13/13
Fine Gael	Galway West	2024	5,335	8.8	Eliminated on count 13/16
Fine Gael	Galway West	2026 by-election	9,647	20.1	Elected on count 11/11

Political offices
Preceded by Joe McHugh; Aodhán Ó Ríordáin as Ministers of State at the Department of Arts, Heritage and the Gaeltacht	Minister of State at the Department of Arts, Heritage, Regional, Rural and Gaeltacht Affairs; 2016–2017; With: Michael Ring	Succeeded by Joe McHugh as Minister of State at the Department of Culture, Heritage and the Gaeltacht
Preceded by Joe McHugh as Minister of State at the Department of Communications, Energy and Natural Resources	Minister of State at the Department of Communications, Climate Action and Environment; 2016–2018	Succeeded by Seán Canney
New department	Minister of State at the Department of Rural and Community Development; 2017–2018	Succeeded by Seán Canney
Preceded by Joe McHugh	Government Chief Whip; 2018–2020	Succeeded by Dara Calleary
Preceded by Joe McHugh	Minister of State at the Department of Culture, Heritage and the Gaeltacht; 2018–2020	Succeeded by Dara Calleary

Dáil	Election	Deputy (Party)	Deputy (Party)	Deputy (Party)	Deputy (Party)	Deputy (Party)
9th	1937	Gerald Bartley (FF)	Joseph Mongan (FG)	Seán Tubridy (FF)	3 seats 1937–1977	
10th	1938	Gerald Bartley (FF)	Joseph Mongan (FG)	Seán Tubridy (FF)	3 seats 1937–1977	
10th	1940 by-election	Gerald Bartley (FF)	Joseph Mongan (FG)	John J. Keane (FF)	3 seats 1937–1977	
11th	1943	Gerald Bartley (FF)	Joseph Mongan (FG)	Eamon Corbett (FF)	3 seats 1937–1977	
12th	1944	Gerald Bartley (FF)	Joseph Mongan (FG)	Michael Lydon (FF)	3 seats 1937–1977	
13th	1948	Gerald Bartley (FF)	Joseph Mongan (FG)	Michael Lydon (FF)	3 seats 1937–1977	
14th	1951	Gerald Bartley (FF)	John Mannion Snr (FG)	Peadar Duignan (FF)	3 seats 1937–1977	
15th	1954	Gerald Bartley (FF)	Fintan Coogan Snr (FG)	Johnny Geoghegan (FF)	3 seats 1937–1977	
16th	1957	Gerald Bartley (FF)	Fintan Coogan Snr (FG)	Johnny Geoghegan (FF)	3 seats 1937–1977	
17th	1961	Gerald Bartley (FF)	Fintan Coogan Snr (FG)	Johnny Geoghegan (FF)	3 seats 1937–1977	
18th	1965	Bobby Molloy (FF)	Fintan Coogan Snr (FG)	Johnny Geoghegan (FF)	3 seats 1937–1977	
19th	1969	Bobby Molloy (FF)	Fintan Coogan Snr (FG)	Johnny Geoghegan (FF)	3 seats 1937–1977	
20th	1973	Bobby Molloy (FF)	Fintan Coogan Snr (FG)	Johnny Geoghegan (FF)	3 seats 1937–1977	
20th	1975 by-election	Bobby Molloy (FF)	Fintan Coogan Snr (FG)	Máire Geoghegan-Quinn (FF)	3 seats 1937–1977	
21st	1977	Bobby Molloy (FF)	John Mannion Jnr (FG)	Máire Geoghegan-Quinn (FF)	Bill Loughnane (FF)	4 seats 1977–1981
22nd	1981	Bobby Molloy (FF)	John Donnellan (FG)	Máire Geoghegan-Quinn (FF)	Mark Killilea Jnr (FF)	Michael D. Higgins (Lab)
23rd	1982 (Feb)	Bobby Molloy (FF)	John Donnellan (FG)	Máire Geoghegan-Quinn (FF)	Frank Fahey (FF)	Michael D. Higgins (Lab)
24th	1982 (Nov)	Bobby Molloy (FF)	John Donnellan (FG)	Máire Geoghegan-Quinn (FF)	Frank Fahey (FF)	Fintan Coogan Jnr (FG)
25th	1987	Bobby Molloy (PDs)	John Donnellan (FG)	Máire Geoghegan-Quinn (FF)	Frank Fahey (FF)	Michael D. Higgins (Lab)
26th	1989	Bobby Molloy (PDs)	Pádraic McCormack (FG)	Máire Geoghegan-Quinn (FF)	Frank Fahey (FF)	Michael D. Higgins (Lab)
27th	1992	Bobby Molloy (PDs)	Pádraic McCormack (FG)	Máire Geoghegan-Quinn (FF)	Éamon Ó Cuív (FF)	Michael D. Higgins (Lab)
28th	1997	Bobby Molloy (PDs)	Pádraic McCormack (FG)	Frank Fahey (FF)	Éamon Ó Cuív (FF)	Michael D. Higgins (Lab)
29th	2002	Noel Grealish (PDs)	Pádraic McCormack (FG)	Frank Fahey (FF)	Éamon Ó Cuív (FF)	Michael D. Higgins (Lab)
30th	2007	Noel Grealish (PDs)	Pádraic McCormack (FG)	Frank Fahey (FF)	Éamon Ó Cuív (FF)	Michael D. Higgins (Lab)
31st	2011	Noel Grealish (Ind.)	Brian Walsh (FG)	Seán Kyne (FG)	Éamon Ó Cuív (FF)	Derek Nolan (Lab)
32nd	2016	Noel Grealish (Ind.)	Hildegarde Naughton (FG)	Seán Kyne (FG)	Éamon Ó Cuív (FF)	Catherine Connolly (Ind.)
33rd	2020	Noel Grealish (Ind.)	Hildegarde Naughton (FG)	Mairéad Farrell (SF)	Éamon Ó Cuív (FF)	Catherine Connolly (Ind.)
34th	2024	Noel Grealish (Ind.)	Hildegarde Naughton (FG)	Mairéad Farrell (SF)	John Connolly (FF)	Catherine Connolly (Ind.)
34th	2026 by-election	Noel Grealish (Ind.)	Hildegarde Naughton (FG)	Mairéad Farrell (SF)	John Connolly (FF)	Seán Kyne (FG)
