= Helen Ogbu =

Irish Labour Party politician

Cllr Helen Ogbu

Mayor of Galway
- Incumbent
- Assumed office 19 June 2026
- Preceded by: Mike Cubbard

Galway City Councillor
- Incumbent
- Assumed office June 2024
- Constituency: Galway City East

Personal details
- Born: 1972 or 1973 (age 53–54) Nigeria
- Party: Labour Party
- Education: University of Galway

Helen Ogbu is an Irish Labour Party politician, researcher and community worker who has served as Mayor of Galway since 2026. She has served as a member of Galway City Council for the Galway City East electoral area since 2024. She was the first African woman elected to Galway City Council.

== Early life and education ==
Ogbu was born in Nigeria and later settled in Galway, where she has lived for more than two decades. She is a doctoral researcher at the University of Galway, where her research is based at the UNESCO Child and Family Research Centre.

== Career ==
Before entering politics, Ogbu worked in the community and voluntary sector. She was employed by Galway Volunteer Centre as a Project Development and Organisation Support Officer and Garda Vetting Liaison Officer. She has also volunteered with organisations including the Galway Refugee Support Group and the Galway Rape Crisis Centre.

Her research and public advocacy have focused on community development, volunteering, social inclusion and public participation.

== Political career ==
=== Galway City Council ===
Ogbu was elected to Galway City Council for the Galway City East local electoral area at the 2024 Irish local elections, becoming the first African woman elected to the council.

As a councillor, she has advocated increased investment in housing, public transport, childcare, neighbourhood services, climate action and community development. She has also supported the compulsory purchase and reuse of vacant and derelict buildings to increase housing supply.

=== Election campaigns ===
Ogbu was the Labour Party candidate for Galway West at the 2024 Irish general election. Following the election of Catherine Connolly as President of Ireland, Labour selected her as its candidate for the Galway West by-election held in May 2026. During the by-election campaign, she identified housing affordability, public transport, the cost of living and public services as her principal priorities. Ogbu, who was one of six candidates in the Vote Left, Transfer Left electoral pact, received 11.4% of first preference votes and was eliminated on the 10th count.

=== Mayor of Galway ===
On 19 June 2026, Ogbu was elected as the 72nd Mayor of Galway, during the Annual Meeting of Galway City Council. Soon after her election, reports emerged of errors surrounding her asylum timeline in Ireland. Her personal website had stated she sought asylum in Ireland in 2006 after her husband, Sunny, was assassinated in Nigeria, but Sunny actually died in 2010. Speaking to Galway Bay FM on 1 July 2026, Ogbu said that "incompetence" was to blame for the errors.
