= Daryl Barron =

Irish politician

Cllr Daryl Barron
- Barron in 2026

Lord Mayor of Dublin
- Incumbent
- Assumed office 29 June 2026
- Preceded by: Ray McAdam

Dublin City Councillor
- Incumbent
- Assumed office May 2019
- Constituency: Donaghmede

Personal details
- Party: Fianna Fáil
- Spouse: Orla Barron
- Children: 1

Daryl Barron is an Irish Fianna Fáil politician, who has served as Lord Mayor of Dublin since 2026. He has been a Dublin City Councillor for the Donaghmede electoral area since the 2019 Dublin City Council elections.

== Political career ==
Barron, who previously worked with the Bank of Ireland, was elected to Dublin City Council in 2019. Since being elected as a representative of the Donaghmede local electoral area on Dublin's Northside, Barron has served on a number of council committees and working groups, including acting as chairperson on the North Central Area Committee. Barron, who is also the group leader of the Fianna Fáil members of the council, retained his seat in the 2024 Dublin City Council elections.

At a meeting of Dublin City Council, held on 29 June 2026, Barron was elected by his fellow councillors to be the Lord Mayor of Dublin for the 2026 to 2027 municipal year.

Civic offices
Preceded by Ray McAdam	Lord Mayor of Dublin; 2026–present	Incumbent
