= Maeve O'Rourke =

Irish human rights lawyer

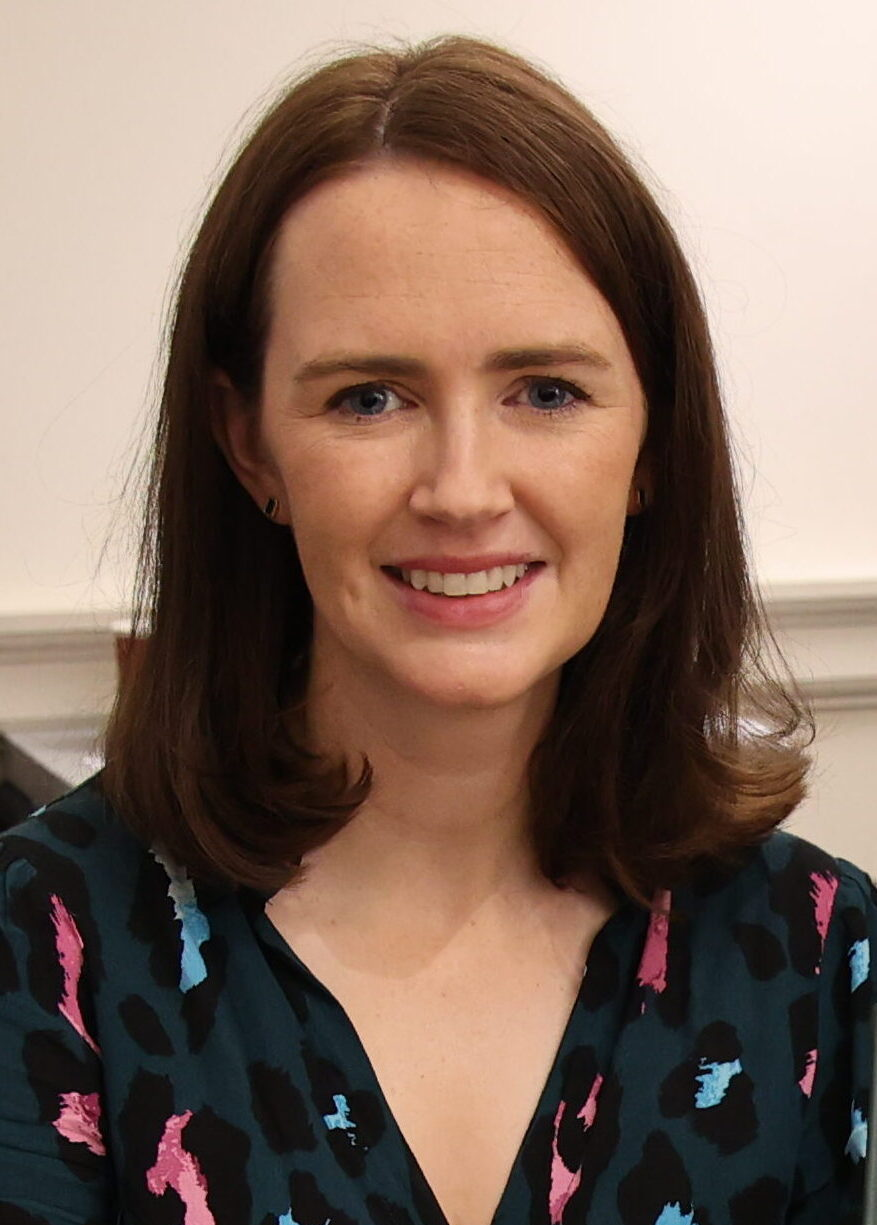
- O'Rourke in 2024
- Occupation: Human rights lawyer
- Spouse: Ciarán Ahern (m. 2020)
- Children: 1
- Father: Sean O'Rourke

Maeve O'Rourke is an Irish human rights lawyer. She is known for her involvement in seeking access for survivors and adopted people to their own personal data, and the publication of appropriately anonymised administrative files, contained in 'historical' abuse archives in Ireland including the archives of the Mother and Baby Homes Commission of Investigation, the Ryan Commission that investigated industrial and reformatory Schools, and the McAleese Committee that inquired into Magdalene Laundries.

As of 2020, she lectures in Human Rights Law at the Irish Centre for Human Rights in the University of Galway. She is a member of Justice for Magdalenes Research. O'Rourke campaigns on behalf of unmarried mothers and their children. She has represented victims before the Irish Human Rights Commission, and numerous United Nations human rights treaty bodies. In October 2020, she was critical of the Government's statement that it intended to 'seal' information regarding Ireland's mother and baby homes for 30 years.

In 2026, she was nominated by the Law Society of Ireland, the Irish Dental Association, and Comhlámh to contest the 2026 Seanad by-election as an independent candidate, and received support from the Labour Party and the Social Democrats. She received 23.5% of the first-preference votes and was not elected.

== Personal life ==
Her father is broadcaster Sean O'Rourke. She married employment solicitor Ciarán Ahern on 4 January 2020. Ahern was elected as a Labour Party TD for Dublin South-West at the 2024 general election. The couple have a son together.
