= Aidan Eames =

Irish solicitor and former politician

Senator
- In office 13 December 1982 – 23 February 1983
- Constituency: Nominated by the Taoiseach

Personal details
- Political party: Fianna Fáil

Aidan Eames is an Irish solicitor and former politician. He briefly served as a Fianna Fáil member of the 16th Seanad. He was nominated by the Taoiseach Charles Haughey, on 13 December 1982, to fill a vacancy after the November 1982 general election. He did not contest the 1983 Seanad election.

He is a practising solicitor in the firm of Eames and Company. He was a director of Bord Gáis from 2004 until 2014. He was a non-executive director at Irish Bank Resolution Corporation from May 2010 to February 2013.
