= Hope and Courage Collective =

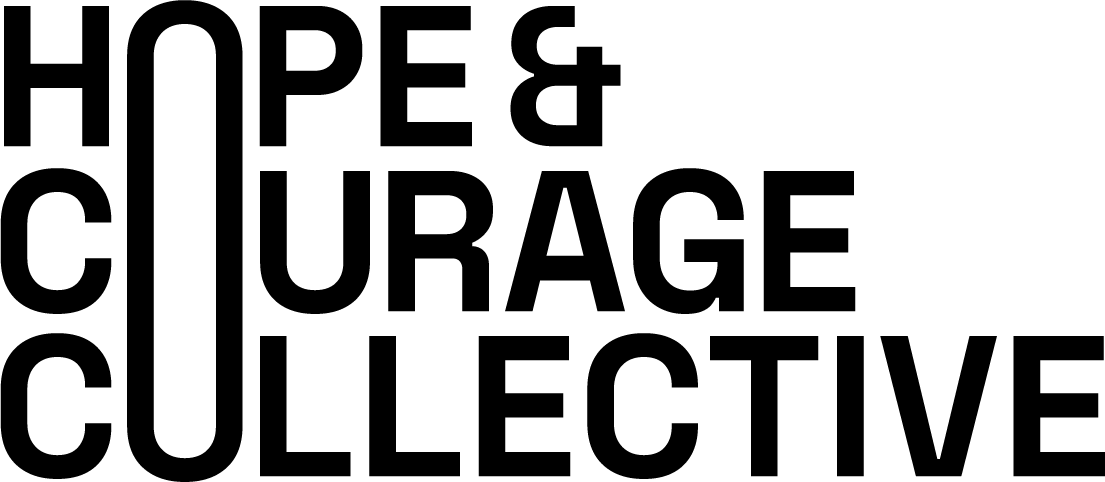
- Abbreviation: HCC
- Formation: 2019
- Type: Non-governmental organisation
- Legal status: Active
- Purpose: Monitoring and countering far-right activity and hate-based movements
- Headquarters: Dublin, Ireland
- Region served: Ireland
- Executive Director: Edel McGinley
- Key people: Niamh McDonald (Coordinator); Siobhán O'Donoghue (Coordinator)
- Affiliations: Irish Network Against Racism; Irish Council for Civil Liberties; Migrant Rights Centre Ireland; Transgender Equality Network of Ireland; Pavee Point; National Women's Council of Ireland
- Funding: State funding (Dormant Accounts Scheme); private philanthropic grants
- Website: hopeandcourage.ie
- Formerly called: Far Right Observatory

The Hope and Courage Collective (HCC) is a civil society organisation and NGO based in Ireland that focuses on monitoring, researching, and countering far-right activity and hate-based movements. It was founded in 2019 as the Far Right Observatory (FRO). The organisation works through collaborations with community groups, trade unions, advocacy organisations, and academic institutions.

The Hope and Courage Collective publishes reports, toolkits, and case studies designed to assist communities and organisations in addressing issues related to hate, extremism, and misinformation. It conducts research into the activities and strategies of far-right groups in Ireland, with a particular focus on the role of social media platforms and online algorithms in disseminating such content. One of HCC’s publications was Greater than Fear, a report released in 2023 that outlines case studies from Irish towns and provides strategic recommendations for countering far-right mobilisation.

HCC has also been involved in formal processes concerning the registration of political parties, including making an appeal to the Electoral Commission in 2023 regarding the registration of the Ireland First party.

In January 2025, HCC criticised Meta's decision to remove fact-checking mechanisms, arguing that it exacerbates the spread of hate and misinformation. Executive Director Edel McGinley stated that algorithms often lead users "down the river of hate," undermining truth and compassion. In April 2025, HCC participated in a press event alongside People Before Profit TDs, advocating for legislation to disable recommender algorithms on platforms like YouTube and TikTok for users under 18. Niamh McDonald of HCC stated at the event that an Irish Instagram account had gained 277,000 followers in under six months by sharing racist, Islamophobic, and anti-immigrant content that received three million views daily.
