= Helena McAuliffe-Ennis =

Irish politician (born 1951)

Senator
- In office 23 February 1983 – 25 April 1987
- Constituency: Cultural and Educational Panel

Personal details
- Born: Helena McAuliffe; 1 April 1951 (age 75) Milltownpass, County Westmeath, Ireland
- Party: Labour Party; Progressive Democrats
- Parent: Timothy McAuliffe (father)
- Education: Craiglockart College of Education, Edinburgh; St Patrick's College, Maynooth

Helena McAuliffe-Ennis (née McAuliffe; born 1 April 1951) is a former Labour Party and Progressive Democrats politician from County Westmeath in Ireland. She was a senator from 1983 to 1987.

== Biography ==
McAuliffe was born in 1951 in Milltownpass, County Westmeath; her father Timothy McAuliffe was later a Labour Party senator.

She was educated at Milltownpass national school, Rochfortbridge national school, and then at Scoil Catríona in Eccles Street, Dublin. She then trained as a teacher at Craiglockart College of Education in Edinburgh, graduating in 1972. She later took a postgraduate diploma in adult and community education at St Patrick's College, Maynooth from 1989 to 1990, and worked as an adult literacy organiser.

She joined the Labour Party in the 1970s, and when her father stood down from Seanad Éireann at the 1983 election, she stood as a Labour candidate for his seat on the Cultural and Educational Panel. She was elected to the 17th Seanad, but switched to the Progressive Democrats (PD) when the new party was founded in December 1985, having been elected to Westmeath County Council earlier that year as a Labour candidate. After unsuccessfully contesting the 1987 general election as a PD candidate in the Longford–Westmeath constituency, she did not stand in the 1987 election to the 18th Seanad. In 1988 she rejoined the Labour Party.
