= Frank Wall =

Frank Wall may refer to:

- Frank Wall (herpetologist) (1868–1950), physician and herpetologist in Sri Lanka and India
- Frank Wall (American politician) (1908–1998), member of the Mississippi House of Representatives
- Frank Wall (Australian politician) (1879–1941), Australian politician
- Frank Wall (Irish politician) (active 1981–1991), Irish politician
- Frank Wall (steamboat engineer) (1810–1896), American engineer
- Frank Wall (hurler), Irish hurler
- Frank E. Wall, American accountant and sports executive
