= James Crosbie (senator) =

Irish politician

Senator
- In office 22 July 1954 – 22 May 1957
- In office 7 September 1938 – 8 September 1943
- Constituency: Cultural and Educational Panel
- In office 8 September 1943 – 14 August 1951
- In office 27 April 1938 – 7 September 1938
- Constituency: Industrial and Commercial Panel

Personal details
- Political party: Fine Gael

James Crosbie was an Irish Fine Gael politician, barrister and journalist. He was a member of Seanad Éireann from 1938 to 1951 and from 1954 to 1957. He was elected to the 2nd Seanad in March 1938 by the Industrial and Commercial Panel. He was re-elected to the 3rd Seanad by the Cultural and Educational Panel in August 1938.

At the 1943, 1944 and 1948 elections he was elected again by the Industrial and Commercial Panel. He lost his seat at the 1951 election, but was re-elected at the 1954 election this time by the Cultural and Educational Panel. He was defeated again at the 1957 election.
