= Seán O'Connor (businessman) =

Irish businessman and politician (born 1960)

Senator
- In office 13 December 1982 – 23 February 1983
- Constituency: Nominated by the Taoiseach

Personal details
- Born: 29 April 1960 (age 66) Dublin, Ireland
- Education: Dublin Institute of Technology; Dublin City University; Ulster University
- Occupation: Academic
- Known for: Rally Ireland

Seán O'Connor (born 29 April 1960) is an Irish motorsport promoter and academic who previously served as a member of Seanad Éireann.

== Early life and family ==
O'Connor was educated at Terenure College, Dublin, where he was a member of the Senior Cup rugby team. He has a degree in marketing from Dublin Institute of Technology (DIT), an MA in political communications from Dublin City University, and a doctorate from the Ulster University.

A grandson of Taoiseach Seán Lemass, he lives in County Wicklow. His son, Rory O'Connor, was a member of Wicklow County Council until 2024.

== Political life ==
On 13 December 1982, after the November 1982 general election saw three members of the 16th Seanad elected to the 22nd Dáil, O'Connor was one of those nominated to fill the vacancies by Taoiseach Charles Haughey. He was the youngest member of the 16th Seanad, at 22 years of age, and was also elected to the Fianna Fail National Executive at same time. He did not attend the Seanad on 21 December 1982, its only subsequent sitting before its dissolution.

O'Connor was an unsuccessful candidate in the Dublin University constituency at the 2007 Seanad election receiving 3.0% of the first-preference votes, under the slogan "Graduate Equality", for opening the Seanad university constituency to graduates of all third-level institutions in the state. He had successfully petitioned the High Court to give candidates the same access to the NUI electoral register which incumbent senators have.

== Business career ==
O'Connor was based in Dubai working for Philip Morris sponsorship of motorsports, in the mid 1980s, including promotion of the Abu Dhabi Desert Challenge.

Together with Ronan Morgan, he co-founded Rally Ireland in 2005, which was considered leading rally and had World Rally Championship status from 2007 to 2009. According to a research, over 250,0000 spectators has attended the event with an economic benefit of €48 million.

In 2009, he joined the Automobile & Touring Club of the United Arab Emirates as Director of Strategy to assist in the staging of the first Abu Dhabi Formula 1 Grand Prix.

He has been active in academic research and was co-editor in 2015 of the first academic book on sport management in the Middle East.

In 2021, he was appointed campaign manager for the bid by Mohammed bin Sulayem to become the first non-European President of the FIA, the governing body for Formula One.

In 2026, O'Connor left the FIA and founded the Native Irish Honey Bee Sanctuary on Inishturk Island.

== Bibliography ==
- O'Connor, Sean; Sulayem, Mohammed Ben; Hassan, David (23 May 2013). Sport Management in the Middle East: A Case Study Analysis
