= Keith Swanick =

Irish former politician

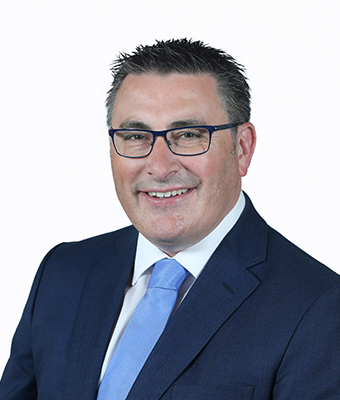
- Swanick in 2016

Senator
- In office 8 June 2016 – 29 June 2020
- Constituency: Cultural and Educational Panel

Personal details
- Born: Castlerea, County Roscommon, Ireland
- Party: Fianna Fáil
- Spouse: Aislinn Swanick (m. 2007)
- Children: 2
- Education: Royal College of Surgeons; NUI Galway

Keith Swanick is an Irish former Fianna Fáil politician who served as a Senator for the Cultural and Educational Panel from 2016 to 2020.

== Early life and education ==
Originally from Castlerea in County Roscommon, Swanick and his wife run a GP Practice in Belmullet in the Erris region of North Mayo. He is also the Secretary of the National Association of Irish General Practitioners.

== Career ==
He was chosen as a candidate for Fianna Fáil in a Seanad by-election after the retirement of Jimmy Harte, which was won by Labour's Máiría Cahill. He initially considered contesting the 2016 general election in the Roscommon–Galway constituency but declined.

He was the Fianna Fáil Seanad spokesperson on Health and Mental Health.

He did not contest the 2020 Seanad election, after being involved in an Oireachtas expenses controversy. It was revealed that he was accepting appointments at his GP practice in Mayo on the same day that he was registered as present in the Seanad in Dublin. An RTÉ investigation showed that over a three-year period he claimed almost €73,000 in travel expenses, but failed to vote on 84 of the 114 voting days he was signed in for at Leinster House.
