= Séamus de Brún =

Irish teacher and politician (1911–2003)

Senator
- In office 13 May 1982 – 25 April 1987
- Constituency: Cultural and Educational Panel
- In office 27 October 1977 – 8 October 1981
- Constituency: Nominated by the Taoiseach

Personal details
- Born: 1 October 1911; Connemara, County Galway, Ireland
- Died: 5 March 2003 (aged 91); County Galway, Ireland
- Political party: Fianna Fáil
- Spouse: Brid O'Hara (m. 1944)
- Children: 3

Séamus de Brún (1 October 1911 – 5 March 2003) was an Irish teacher, senator and promoter of the Irish language and culture. A lifelong member of Fianna Fáil, he was particularly noted for his work as a trustee and president of Comhaltas Ceoltóirí Éireann.

== Family and early life ==
De Brún was born in Cornamona, in Connemara, County Galway, one of six children of Tadhg de Brún and his wife Kit (née Burke). He was educated locally and won a scholarship to Coláiste Connacht in Tourmakeady, County Mayo, where he qualified as a múinteoir taistil (a travelling teacher of Irish).

After a time teaching in Sligo, he was appointed 1944 to a teaching post in Elphin, County Roscommon with Roscommon Vocational Education Committee (VEC), and in 1945 he transferred to the vocational school at Castlerea, where he taught until his retirement in 1977.

Whilst teaching an Irish-language summer Course in Tourmakeady, he met Brid O'Hara, from Tourlestrane, in County Sligo. They married in 1944, and had three children.

== Career ==
In 1951, de Brún was one of the early members of Comhaltas Ceoltóirí Éireann (CCE), a voluntary organisation dedicated to the promotion of the music, song, dance and language of Ireland, which were then in decline. Seamus and Bríd were both stalwarts of Comhaltas, and Bríd died in 1998 in a car crash in Swinford, County Mayo en route to a meeting in Ballina of the Fleadh Cheoil committee.

He was a founder of the Castlerea branch of CCE, and held a series of local, provincial and national posts within the organisation, serving as national president from 1970 to 1973, and leading CCE's first tour of the United States in 1972.

A member of the national council of Oireachtas na Gaeilge (an annually held festival of Irish culture), he adjudicated at music competitions and was recognised as an authority on sean nós singing. He was a member for 15 years of Comhairle Raidió na Gaeltachta (the advisory board of RTÉ Raidió na Gaeltachta), and in the 1970s he was as a member of the Roscommon VEC.

Although he lived most of his life in Roscommon, he continued to support the Galway GAA hurling and gaelic football teams, and took his holidays in Galway.

== Politics ==
At the 1977 general election, de Brún was director of elections for the successful Fianna Fáil campaign in Roscommon, and was rewarded by being nominated by the Taoiseach Jack Lynch to the 14th Seanad.

In the 1981 elections to the 15th Seanad, he stood on the Cultural and Educational Panel, but did not win a seat. However, he was successful in the 1982 election to the 16th Seanad, and was re-elected at the 1983 election to the 16th Seanad. He stood down at the 1987 election, to devote his energies to other causes.

On his death in 2001, senators from all parties praised his contributions to Irish culture and to the Seanad. Independent senator Shane Ross described de Brún's contributions to the upper house as "absolutely priceless, quite invaluable and an education to the rest of us", noting that de Brún "only spoke on matters about which he felt he was elected to speak and about which he could make a contribution".
