= Patrick J. O'Reilly (politician) =

Irish politician (died 1965)

Senator
- In office 18 August 1944 – 21 April 1948
- Constituency: Cultural and Educational Panel

Personal details
- Party: Independent

Patrick John O'Reilly (died 16 July 1965) was an Irish politician. He was elected to Seanad Éireann to the Cultural and Educational Panel as an independent candidate at the 1944 Seanad election. He did not contest the 1948 Seanad election. He was the chief executive officer of County Cavan Vocational Education Committee.
