= Migrant Rights Centre Ireland =

Irish organization

- Founded: 2001
- Type: NGO
- Location: Dublin, Ireland
- Fields: Refugees, Immigration, Activism
- Website: www.mrci.ie

The Migrant Rights Centre Ireland (MRCI) is a voluntary organisation advocating for migrant rights in Ireland.

== History ==
MRCI are a voluntary organisation working with migrants in Ireland, advocating and advising on employment policy and legislation for immigrants.

== Core activities ==
One of the core areas on which the MRCI focus is supporting migrants in low or minimum wage and less regulated work, who are at higher risk of poor and exploitative working conditions. They also support victims of trafficking for labour exploitation, and undocumented, unemployed or underemployed migrants. To facilitate this work, the MRCI provide access to rights and entitlements, provide information, conduct case work, and work with migrants in campaigning.

In response to the COVID-19 pandemic, MRCI advocated for those working in meat factories as a potential at-risk group with insufficient supports should they fall ill.
