= Sean O'Rourke =

Irish journalist and broadcaster

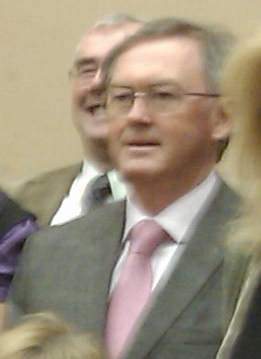
- Sean O'Rourke in 2009
- Born: 22 May 1955 (age 71); Portlaoise, County Laois, Ireland
- Education: University College Galway
- Occupations: Journalist, broadcaster
- Employer: RTÉ
- Notable credit(s): RTÉ News at One; The Week in Politics
- Spouse: Caroline Murphy
- Children: 6

Sean O'Rourke (born 22 May 1955) is an Irish journalist and broadcaster who works for the Irish public broadcaster, RTÉ. From September 2013 until his retirement in May 2020, he presented the Today with Seán O'Rourke show every weekday from 10:00am until midday on RTÉ Radio 1.

== Career ==
An arts graduate from University College Galway, O'Rourke has previously worked for the Connacht Tribune, The Sunday Press and The Irish Press.

In 1989 he joined RTÉ News. For RTÉ he has presented Morning Ireland and This Week. In 1995 he moved to the News at One.

On television he has presented Today Tonight, Prime Time and The Week in Politics.

From 2013 to May 2020 he presented the popular weekday radio programme, Today with, as Today with Sean O'Rourke, being succeeded by Sarah McInerney and then Claire Byrne in that role.

In August 2020, O'Rourke apologised for his involvement in the Oireachtas Golf Society scandal. RTÉ announced that planned projects involving O'Rourke would not proceed.

== Awards ==
O'Rourke has won ESB National Media Awards: Radio Broadcaster of the Year 1997, NUI Galway Alumni Award for Arts, Media & Communications 2007 and 2008 PPI News Broadcaster of the Year. In June 2011 he was awarded an honorary Doctorate of Laws by his alma mater, NUI Galway.

== Personal life ==
O'Rourke was born in Portlaoise, one of eight children of local school principal and hurling enthusiast Kevin O’Rourke. The family later moved to Galway, where he was educated at Coláiste Iognáid. He is married to Caroline Murphy and has six children, one of whom is a human rights lawyer, Maeve O'Rourke. He is a practising Catholic.

As of 2013, he was chair of NUI Galway's alumni association.
