= Patrick F. O'Reilly =

Irish politician

Senator
- In office 14 August 1951 – 22 July 1954
- Constituency: Cultural and Educational Panel

Personal details
- Party: independent

Patrick F. O'Reilly was an Irish independent politician. A solicitor, he was elected to Seanad Éireann for the Cultural and Educational Panel at 1951 Seanad election. He lost his seat at the 1954 Seanad election.
