= Timothy McAuliffe =

Irish politician (1909–1985)

Senator
- In office 1 June 1973 – 23 February 1983
- In office 14 December 1961 – 5 November 1969
- Constituency: Cultural and Educational Panel

Personal details
- Born: 1 February 1909 County Offaly, Ireland
- Died: 29 September 1985 (aged 76)
- Party: Labour Party
- Children: Helena McAuliffe-Ennis

Timothy McAuliffe (1 February 1909 – 29 September 1985) was a Labour Party politician from County Westmeath, Ireland. He was a senator for 8 years from 1961 to 1969, again from 1973 and 1983.

Born in Corbetown, near Edenderry in County Offaly, McAuliffe was a schoolteacher in Milltownpass, County Westmeath.

In 1961, he was elected to the 10th Seanad Éireann on the Cultural and Educational Panel, and held the seat until his defeat at the 1969 election to the 12th Seanad. He stood twice as a candidate for Dáil Éireann, at the 1965 and 1969 general elections for the Longford–Westmeath constituency, but was unsuccessful on both occasions.

McAuliffe was re-elected in the 1973 election to the 13th Seanad, and held the seat until he stood down at 1983 election. His daughter Helena McAuliffe-Ennis was selected by the Labour Party to stand on the Cultural and Educational Panel, and won the seat – though she later joined to the Progressive Democrats.
