= Frank Wall (Irish politician) =

Irish politician

Senator
- In office 13 December 1982 – 23 February 1983
- Constituency: Nominated by the Taoiseach

Personal details
- Political party: Fianna Fáil

Frank Wall is an Irish former politician. He briefly served as a Fianna Fáil member of the 16th Seanad. He was nominated by the Taoiseach Charles Haughey, on 13 December 1982, to fill a vacancy after the November 1982 general election. He did not contest the 1983 Seanad election.

He was the General Secretary of Fianna Fáil from 1981 to 1991.
