= 2014 Longford–Westmeath by-election =

By-election to the 31st Dáil

- 23 May 2014
- Turnout: 50,495 (57.4%)
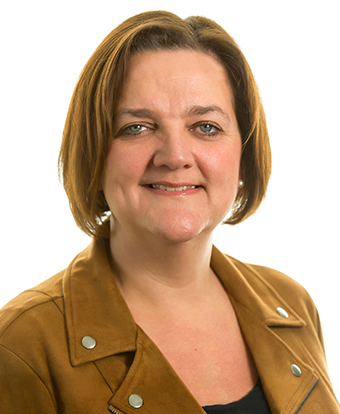
		O'Rourke	Hogan
Nominee	Gabrielle McFadden	Aengus O'Rourke	Paul Hogan
Party	Fine Gael	Fianna Fáil	Sinn Féin
First preferences	12,365	8,910	7,548
Percentage	25.2%	18.2%	15.4%
Final count	20,058	14,581	–
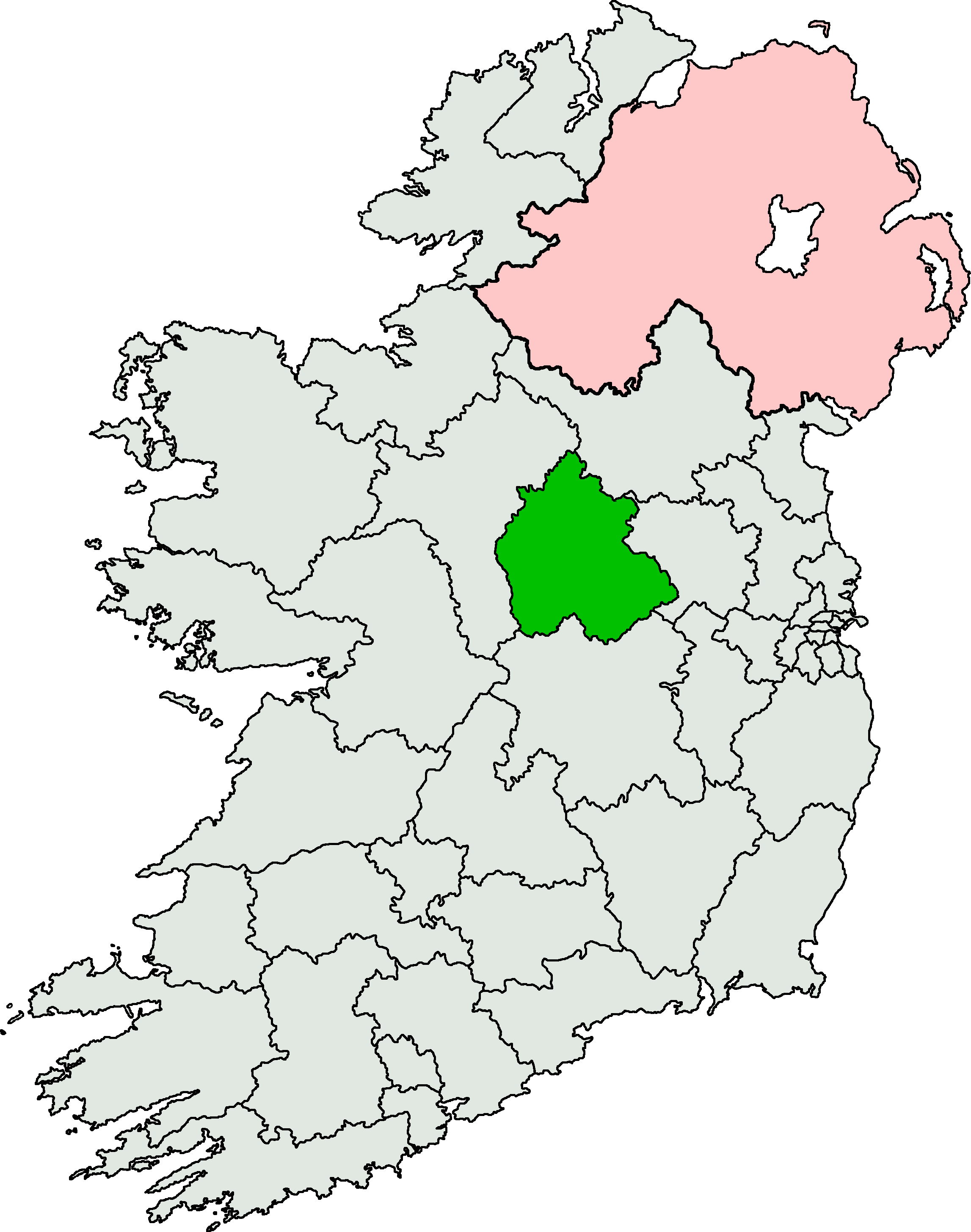
- Longford–Westmeath shown within Ireland
TD before election
Nicky McFadden
Fine Gael
TD after election
Gabrielle McFadden
Fine Gael

A Dáil by-election was held in the constituency of Longford–Westmeath in Ireland on Friday, 23 May 2014, to fill a vacancy in the 31st Dáil. It followed the death of Fine Gael Teachta Dála (TD) Nicky McFadden on 25 March 2014.

It was held on the same day as the 2014 European and local elections, and the Dublin West by-election.

The Electoral (Amendment) Act 2011 stipulates that a by-election in Ireland must be held within six months of a vacancy occurring.

Fine Gael candidate Gabrielle McFadden, sister of the deceased TD, was elected on the seventh count.

McFadden lost her seat at the 2016 general election, and was never subsequently re-elected to the Dáil.

== Result ==
2014 Longford–Westmeath by-election
Party	Candidate	FPv%	Count						
Party	Candidate	FPv%	1	2	3	4	5	6	7
Fine Gael	Gabrielle McFadden	25.2	12,365	12,459	13,414	14,390	15,841	17,564	20,058
Fianna Fáil	Aengus O'Rourke	18.2	8,910	8,966	9,289	9,763	10,811	12,431	14,581
Sinn Féin	Paul Hogan	15.4	7,548	7,677	8,014	8,756	9,570	11,254	
Independent	James Morgan	12.2	5,959	6,096	6,206	6,615			
Independent	Kevin "Boxer" Moran	11.5	5,629	5,849	6,085	6,833	7,797		
Independent	Brian Fagan	8.6	4,195	4,378	4,985				
Labour	Denis Leonard	6.7	3,290	3,352					
Independent	John McNamara	1.8	869						
Independent	Donal Jackson	0.5	238						
Electorate: 87,999 Valid: 49,003 Spoilt: 1,492 (3.0%) Quota: 24,502 Turnout: 50,495 (57.4%)
