= Patrick Doyle (Irish politician) =

Irish politician (died 1964)

Senator
- In office 27 April 1938 – 21 April 1948
- Constituency: Cultural and Educational Panel

Personal details
- Political party: Fine Gael

Patrick Doyle (died October 1964) was an Irish Fine Gael politician. He was a member of Seanad Éireann from 1938 to 1948. He was elected to the 2nd Seanad in March 1938 by the Cultural and Educational Panel. He was re-elected at the August 1938, 1943 and 1944 Seanad elections. He did not contest the 1948 Seanad election.
