= Hall McKnight =

Northern Ireland architectural firm

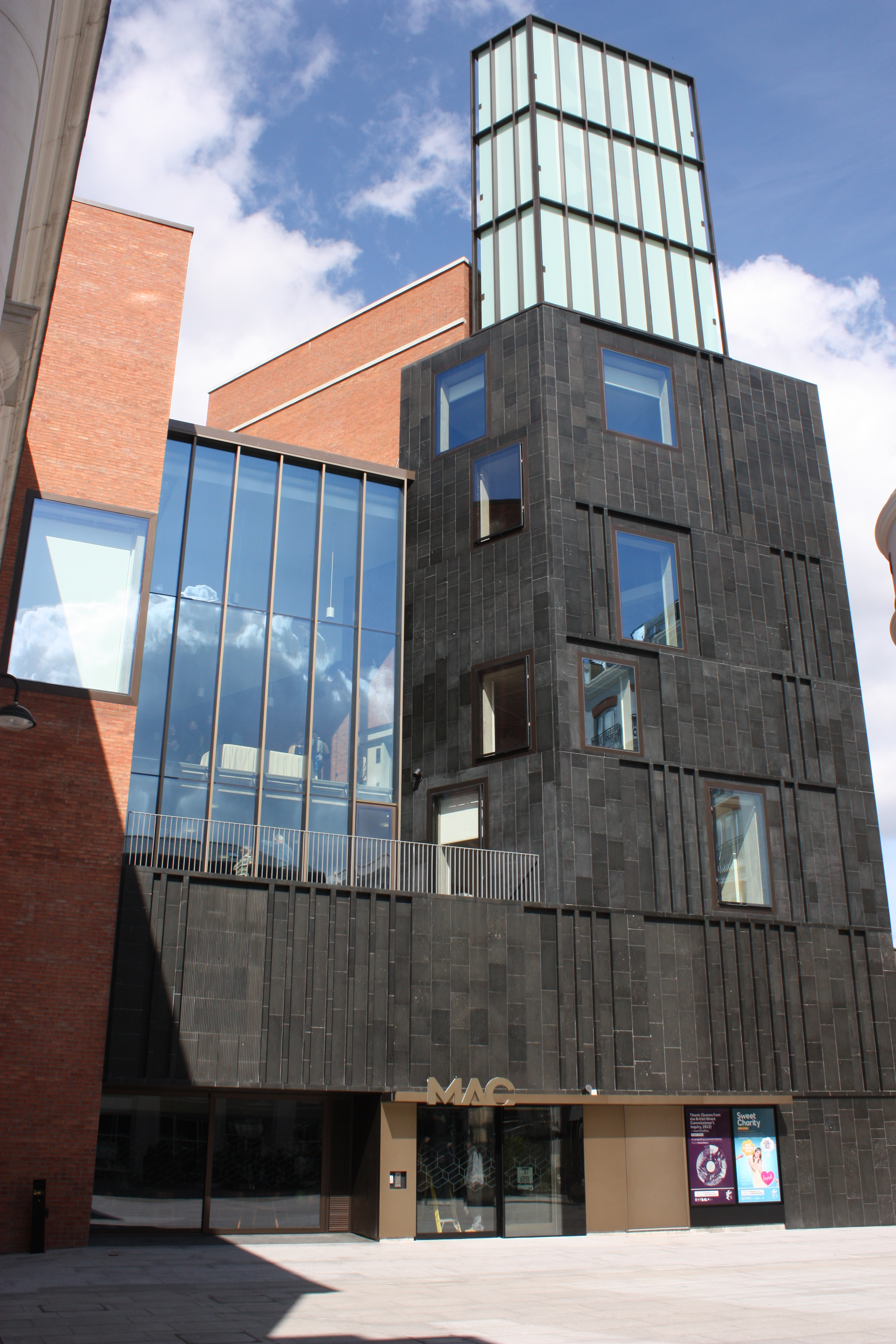
Exterior of the Belfast MAC (2012)

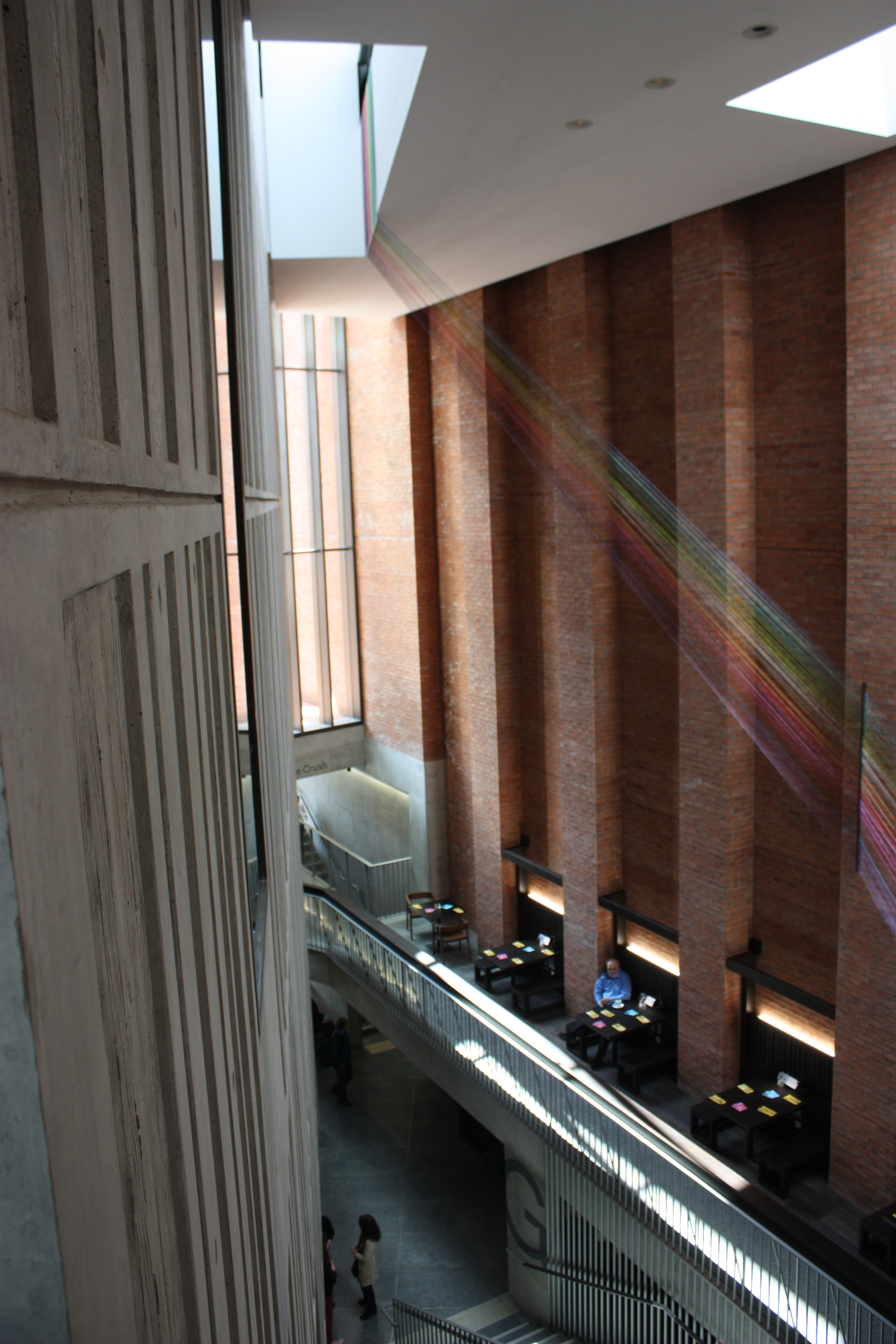
Interior of the Belfast MAC (2012)

Hall McKnight (formerly Hackett Hall McKnight) is an architectural firm based in Belfast, Northern Ireland. In 2008 it won the Young Architect of the Year Award sponsored by Building Design magazine and Autodesk.

== Background ==
The firm was created in 2008 by Mark Hackett, Alastair Hall and Ian McKnight, and named Hackett Hall McKnight but renamed Hall McKnight after Mark Hackett retired in 2010. Hackett went on to lead the Forum for Alternative Belfast.

Rather than aim to create an 'Irish' architecture, Hall McKnight bases its work on what methods and skills the local construction industry can do well. The company's first major public project was the Belfast MAC (Metropolitan Arts Centre), which opened in 2012. The six-storey building, located behind St Anne's Cathedral, includes two performance spaces and a tower clad in black basalt. The Telegraph described it as one of the "most stunning new British buildings of the century". Expressing the idea of 'architecture as collage', the Belfast MAC was described by Architectural Review as "at once pragmatic and ambitious, perhaps even romantic in its trust in material, light, volume and the resolution of detail". With extensive use of brick inside and out, the MAC won the 2012 Brick Award for Best Public Building.

Hall McKnight won an international competition to redesign Copenhagen's Vartov Square. The square, formerly a carpark, was created with a grove of cherry trees and a variety of seating using concrete and granite. Politiken described the square as over-detailed and "looking like a liquidation sale for a quarry".

In January 2014 the company won the bid to design a £3.5 million tower to be built in front of the town hall in the centre of Ipswich, Suffolk.
