= Vote Left, Transfer Left =

Political phrase in Irish politics

Vote Left, Transfer Left is a political phrase in Irish politics which gained prominence during the 2020 Irish general election and has been used thereafter. It encourages shared support among left-wing political parties via the single transferable vote electoral system. In some cases, it has been codified into a formal electoral pact between candidates.

== Background ==
The 2020 general election, "Vote Left, Transfer Left" was discussed among voters of Sinn Féin, the Green Party, People Before Profit, Social Democrats and independent candidates. The pact encourages left-wing voters to transfer their votes to other left-wing parties. There was evidence of such transfers in counts for the 2024 general election. People Before Profit openly endorsed the pact in their manifesto. The vote transfers had evidently increased since the 2016 general election. Following the 2025 presidential election, debate of a pact emerged for the next general election.

== 2026 by-elections ==
A "Vote Left, Transfer Left" pact was used in the 2026 Galway West by-election. Following the election of Catherine Connolly as president of Ireland, a new Galway-based political group called Tonn na Clé (Left Wave) began promoting a "vote left, transfer left" pact. In March 2026, it was reported that six candidates in Galway West proposed to agree a "Vote Left, Transfer Left" pact.

It was promoted by the People Before Profit candidate in the 2026 Dublin Central by-election. Five candidates attended Connigh Clé (Keep Left) events and endorsed the idea of a transfer pact but fell short of agreeing to a formal pact as had been done in Galway.

Following the by-election results, Social Democrats leader Holly Cairns celebrated the strength of the pact in the by-elections and endorsed the idea of similar pacts in future elections. In May 2026, she ruled out any formal left-wing alliance ahead of the next general election.

== See also ==
- Centre-left politics
