= Ray McAdam =

Irish politician (born 1984)

Senator Ray McAdam
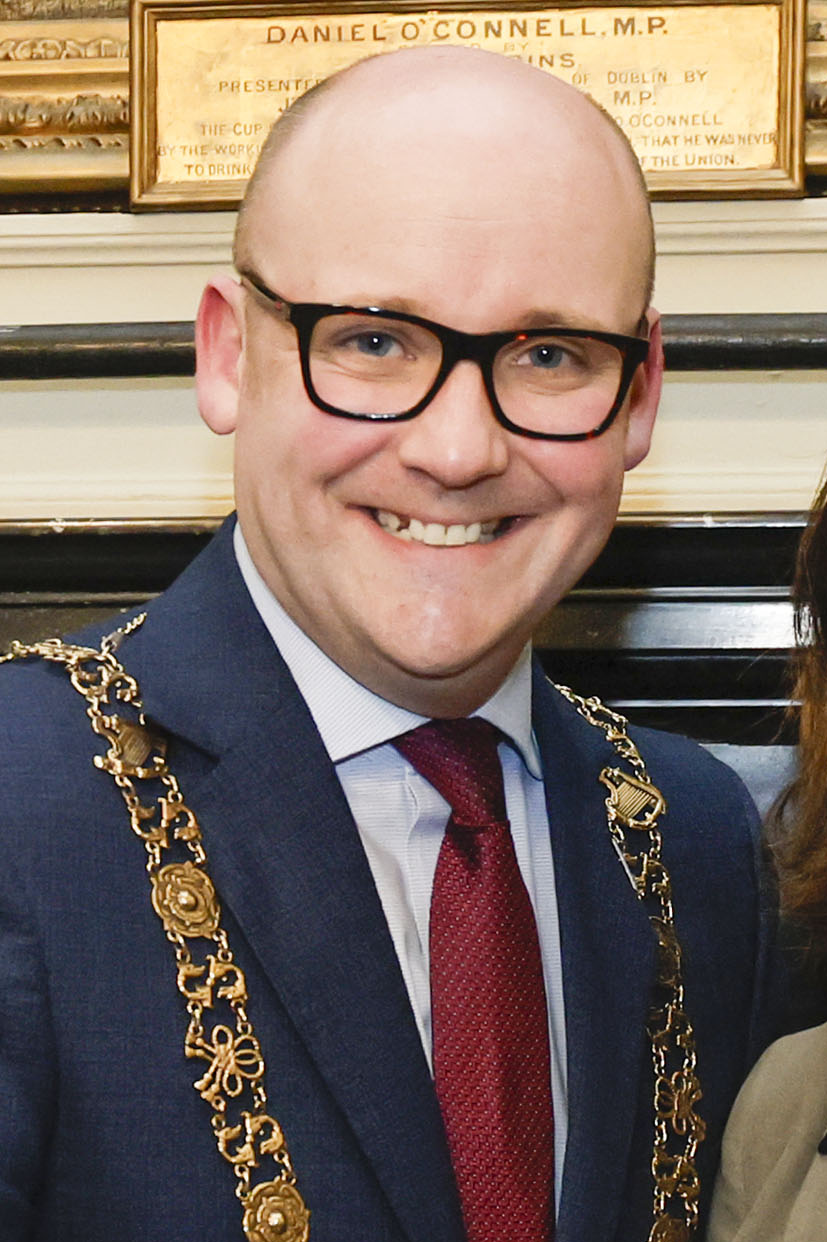
- McAdam in 2026

Senator
- Incumbent
- Assumed office November 2026
- Constituency: Cultural and Educational Panel

Lord Mayor of Dublin
- In office 30 June 2025 – 29 June 2026
- Preceded by: Emma Blain
- Succeeded by: Daryl Barron

Dublin City Councillor
- In office 5 June 2009 – 6 November 2026
- Constituency: North Inner City

Personal details
- Born: 1983/1984 (age 42–43) Cootehill, County Cavan, Ireland
- Party: Fine Gael
- Spouse: Niamh McAdam
- Children: 1
- Education: Trinity College Dublin

Ray McAdam (born 1984) is an Irish Fine Gael politician who has been a senator for the Cultural and Educational Panel since November 2026. He served as a Dublin City Councillor for the North Inner City electoral area from 2009 to 2026, and served as the Lord Mayor of Dublin from 2025 to 2026.

== Early and personal life ==
McAdam was born in County Cavan and grew up very near Wattlebridge, County Fermanagh. His mother, Anne (née Clarke), is from New Line in Cootehill, where her family were very involved in hurling and camogie, as well as Fine Gael. His maternal great-grandfather, James ('Jemmy') Clarke, was one of the founders of the first Fine Gael cumann in Cootehill in the 1930s. He received his secondary education at St Michael's College in Enniskillen, after which he studied philosophy and politics at Trinity College Dublin (TCD), in 2002. He joined Fine Gael at that time. He is married to Niamh McAdam, and they have one son.

== Politics ==
After graduating from TCD, he became a member of the staff of Paschal Donohoe. In 2009, he was first elected to Dublin City Council for the North Inner City area. He was the first Fine Gael politician elected for this area in two decades. He retained his seat at the 2014, 2019 and 2024 local elections.

On 30 June 2025, he was elected as Lord Mayor of Dublin with support from Fine Gael, Fianna Fáil, Labour Party, Green Party and independent councillors. In March 2026, he was selected as the Fine Gael candidate to contest the 2026 Dublin Central by-election, but was not elected.

He was the Fine Gael candidate for the 2026 Seanad by-election, and on 6 November 2026 was elected to the Seanad.

Civic offices
Preceded by Emma Blain	Lord Mayor of Dublin; 2025–2026	Succeeded by Daryl Barron
