= Patrick J. O'Reilly (actor) =

Irish actor, director and writer

- Born: 8 December 1980 (age 45); Cavan, Ireland
- Other name: Patrick Caulfield
- Occupation: Actor
- Years active: 2004–present
- Spouse: Daniel Duckett

Patrick J. O'Reilly (born 8 December 1980) is an Irish actor, director and writer currently living in Belfast, Northern Ireland. He is the recipient of the Stewart Parker Radio Drama Award in 2010. He also adapted Shakespeare's tragedy Othello for Bruiser Theatre Company in 2011.

== Work ==
=== Writer ===
His plays include:

- Tart 2005
- Flesh Dense 2008
- The Weein 2009
- Dinner, An Edible Cabaret 2010
- Othello (as adapted by O'Reilly) 2011
- Lady Windermere's Fan (adaptation) 2012
- Hatch! Adventures of the Ugly Duck (and director) 2013

He has also taught drama and wrote plays for Starburst Theatre School in Ballyearl.

=== Actor ===
O'Reilly has acted in many of his own productions as well as for other productions companies such as Bruiser Theatre Company.

- The Conquest of Happiness 2013
- The Resistible Rise of Arturo Ui 2010
- Oh, What A Lovely War! 2009
- Nose 2014
