= 25th Seanad =

Members of the Seanad from 2016 to 2020

←	24th Seanad	26th Seanad	→

Overview
- Legislative body: Seanad Éireann
- Jurisdiction: Ireland
- Meeting place: Leinster House
- Term: 8 June 2016 – 27 March 2020
- Government: 30th government of Ireland (2016–2017); 31st government of Ireland (2017–2020)
- Members: 60
- Cathaoirleach: Denis O'Donovan (FF)
- Leas-Chathaoirleach: Paul Coghlan (FG)
- Leader of the Seanad: Jerry Buttimer (FG)
- Deputy leader of the Seanad: Catherine Noone (FG)
- Leader of the Opposition: Catherine Ardagh (FF)

Sessions
- 1st: 8 June 2016 – 21 July 2016
- 2nd: 28 September 2016 – 20 July 2017
- 3rd: 26 September 2017 – 17 July 2018
- 4th: 19 September 2018 – 12 July 2019
- 5th: 24 September 2019 – 27 March 2020

The 25th Seanad was in office from 2016 to 2020. An election to Seanad Éireann, the senate of the Oireachtas (Irish parliament), followed the 2016 general election to the 32nd Dáil on 26 February. There are 60 seats in the Seanad: 43 were elected on five vocational panels by serving politicians, for which polling closed on 25 April; 6 were elected in two university constituencies, for which polling closed on 26 April; and 11 were nominated by the Taoiseach (Enda Kenny) on 27 May 2016. It remained in office until the close of poll for the 26th Seanad in March 2020.

== Cathaoirleach ==
On 8 June 2016, when the 25th Seanad first met at Leinster House, Rose Conway-Walsh (SF) was proposed by Trevor Ó Clochartaigh (SF) and seconded by Niall Ó Donnghaile (SF) for the position of Cathaoirleach. Denis O'Donovan (FF) was proposed by Catherine Ardagh (FF) and seconded by Mark Daly (FF). Conway-Walsh was rejected by a vote of 8 to 43. O'Donovan was elected by a vote of 44 to 6.

On 15 June 2016, Máire Devine (SF) was proposed by Pádraig Mac Lochlainn (SF) and seconded by Rose Conway-Walsh (SF) for the position of Leas-Chathaoirleach. Denis Landy (Lab) was proposed by Ivana Bacik (Lab) and seconded by Kevin Humphreys (Lab). Paul Coghlan (FG) was proposed by Jerry Buttimer (FG) and seconded by Paddy Burke. elected as Leas-Chathaoirleach. Gerard Craughwell (Ind) was proposed by Michael McDowell (Ind) and seconded by Victor Boyhan (Ind). Devine was rejected by a vote of 7 to 39. Landy was rejected by a vote of 5 to 27. Coghlan was elected as Leas-Chathaoirleach by a vote of 36 to 11.

== Electoral system ==
There are 60 seats in the Seanad: 43 Senators were elected by the vocational panels, 6 were elected by the two university constituencies, and 11 were nominated by the Taoiseach. Three seats are elected by graduates of the National University of Ireland and three seats are elected by graduates and scholars of the Dublin University.

Article 18.8 of the Constitution requires that an election for Seanad Éireann must take place not later than 90 days after a dissolution of the Dáil. On 9 February, Minister for the Environment, Community and Local Government Alan Kelly signed the orders for the Seanad election.

Nominations for the 43 vocational panel seats closed at noon on 21 March 2016 and the full list of panel nominees was published in Iris Oifigiúil on 1 April 2016. Polls for these two university constituencies closed at 11.00 a.m. on Tuesday 26 April 2016.

Forty-three vocational panel seats are filled by an electorate of public representatives, comprising the incoming 32nd Dáil, the outgoing 24th Seanad, and members of city and county councils, each of whom has one vote in each of the five panels. The total electorate was 1,155. Polling closed at 11 a.m. on Monday 25 April 2016, with the count beginning immediately afterwards. A total of 1,124 of the electorate voted. Each panel is subdivided into an Oireachtas ("inside") subpanel and Nominating Bodies ("outside") subpanel, and a portion of seats must be filled from each subpanel; John Dolan was elected despite having fewer votes than Tom Sheahan and Thomas Welby when they were eliminated, because they were on the inside panel and all remaining seats were reserved for the outside panel.

Taoiseach Enda Kenny nominated 11 senators on 27 May 2016.

The government of the 32nd Dáil was a minority government of Fine Gael and several independent TDs, supported by Fianna Fáil. Similarly, Fine Gael did not hold a majority in the Seanad: and even if all 20 Fine Gael Senators voted in favour of a motion, and all 14 Fianna Fáil Senators abstained, four more votes from independent or opposition Senators were required to pass a motion. There were several very close votes and defeats. This was unusual, as the Senators nominated by the Taoiseach usually give the government a majority.

== Composition of the 25th Seanad ==
Origin Party		Vocational panels					NUI	DU	Nominated	Total
Origin Party		Admin	Agri	Cult & Educ	Ind & Comm	Labour	NUI	DU	Nominated	Total
●	Fine Gael	2	3	2	3	3	0	0	6	19
C	Fianna Fáil	2	3	2	3	4	0	0	0	14
	Sinn Féin	1	2	1	1	2	0	0	0	7
	Labour Party	1	1	0	1	1	0	1	0	5
	Green Party	0	1	0	0	0	0	0	0	1
	Independent	1	1	0	1	1	3	2	5	14
Total		7	11	5	9	11	3	3	11	60

Government party denoted with bullet (●).
Party giving confidence and supply denoted by C.

== Technical groups ==
The minimum parliamentary group size is five Senators, a threshold met by Fine Gael, Fianna Fáil, Sinn Féin, and the following three technical groups. Apart from the Cathaoirleach, independent Marie-Louise O'Donnell was the only senator not a member of any group.

Independent group (9)

Party	Name	Constituency
Independent (9)	Victor Boyhan	Agricultural Panel
Independent (9)	Gerard Craughwell	Labour Panel
Independent (9)	Joan Freeman	Nominated by the Taoiseach
Independent (9)	Billy Lawless	Nominated by the Taoiseach
Independent (9)	Ian Marshall	Agricultural Panel
Independent (9)	Michael McDowell	National University
Independent (9)	Rónán Mullen	National University
Independent (9)	Pádraig Ó Céidigh	Nominated by the Taoiseach
Independent (9)	Brian Ó Domhnaill	Agricultural Panel

All were independents, although not all independent senators were members of the group.

Civil Engagement group (5)

Party	Name	Constituency
Independent (5)	Frances Black	Industrial and Commercial Panel
Independent (5)	John Dolan	Administrative Panel
Independent (5)	Alice-Mary Higgins	National University
Independent (5)	Colette Kelleher	Nominated by the Taoiseach
Independent (5)	Lynn Ruane	Dublin University

All members of the Civil Engagement group were first-time Oireachtas members and independents. This group included Grace O'Sullivan (Green Party) until her election to the European Parliament in May 2019.

Technical group (5)

Party	Name	Constituency
Labour Party (4)	Ivana Bacik	Dublin University
Labour Party (4)	Kevin Humphreys	Administrative Panel
Labour Party (4)	Ged Nash	Labour Panel
Labour Party (4)	Aodhán Ó Ríordáin	Industrial and Commercial Panel
Independent (1)	David Norris	Dublin University

All were in Labour except for independent Norris. Labour formed a party group until the retirement of Denis Landy left it below the five-senator threshold. It first formed a technical group with Trevor Ó Clochartaigh, who had resigned from Sinn Féin. When Ó Clochartaigh resigned from the Seanad, Labour recruited Norris, who had left the Independent group shortly after the 2016 election.

== List of senators ==
- Note: The entries for Senators who were elected or appointed to fill vacancies are shown in italics

Name	Panel	Party	Notes
Martin Conway	Administrative Panel	Fine Gael	
Mark Daly	Administrative Panel	Fianna Fáil	
John Dolan	Administrative Panel	Independent	Member of the Civil Engagement group
Maura Hopkins	Administrative Panel	Fine Gael	
Kevin Humphreys	Administrative Panel	Labour	
Niall Ó Donnghaile	Administrative Panel	Sinn Féin	
Diarmuid Wilson	Administrative Panel	Fianna Fáil	
Victor Boyhan	Agricultural Panel	Independent	Member of the Seanad Independent Group
Paddy Burke	Agricultural Panel	Fine Gael	
Maria Byrne	Agricultural Panel	Fine Gael	
Rose Conway-Walsh	Agricultural Panel	Sinn Féin	Elected to Dáil at the 2020 general election
Paul Daly	Agricultural Panel	Fianna Fáil	
Denis Landy	Agricultural Panel	Labour	Resigned from the Seanad on 28 November 2017
Tim Lombard	Agricultural Panel	Fine Gael	
Trevor Ó Clochartaigh	Agricultural Panel	Sinn Féin	Resigned from Sinn Féin on 30 November 2017; Resigned from the Seanad on 5 February 2018
Brian Ó Domhnaill	Agricultural Panel	Fianna Fáil	Resigned from Fianna Fáil in December 2016. Member of the Seanad Independent Group
Denis O'Donovan	Agricultural Panel	Fianna Fáil	Cathaoirleach
Grace O'Sullivan	Agricultural Panel	Green	Member of the Civil Engagement group. Elected to the European Parliament in May 2019.
Ian Marshall	Agricultural Panel	Ind. Unionist	Elected in a by-election on 27 April 2018, replacing Denis Landy. Member of the Seanad Independent Group
Anthony Lawlor	Agricultural Panel	Fine Gael	Elected in a by-election on 27 April 2018, replacing Trevor Ó Clochartaigh
Pippa Hackett	Agricultural Panel	Green	Elected in a by-election on 1 November 2019, replacing Grace O'Sullivan
Lorraine Clifford-Lee	Cultural and Educational Panel	Fianna Fáil	
Gabrielle McFadden	Cultural and Educational Panel	Fine Gael	
Kieran O'Donnell	Cultural and Educational Panel	Fine Gael	Elected to Dáil at the 2020 general election
Keith Swanick	Cultural and Educational Panel	Fianna Fáil	
Fintan Warfield	Cultural and Educational Panel	Sinn Féin	
Catherine Ardagh	Industrial and Commercial Panel	Fianna Fáil	
Frances Black	Industrial and Commercial Panel	Independent	Member of the Civil Engagement group
Colm Burke	Industrial and Commercial Panel	Fine Gael	Elected to Dáil at the 2020 general election
Paul Coghlan	Industrial and Commercial Panel	Fine Gael	
Aidan Davitt	Industrial and Commercial Panel	Fianna Fáil	
Gerry Horkan	Industrial and Commercial Panel	Fianna Fáil	
Pádraig Mac Lochlainn	Industrial and Commercial Panel	Sinn Féin	Elected to Dáil at the 2020 general election
Catherine Noone	Industrial and Commercial Panel	Fine Gael	
Aodhán Ó Ríordáin	Industrial and Commercial Panel	Labour	Elected to Dáil at the 2020 general election
Jerry Buttimer	Labour Panel	Fine Gael	Leader of the Seanad
Gerard Craughwell	Labour Panel	Independent	Member of the Seanad Independent Group
Máire Devine	Labour Panel	Sinn Féin	
Robbie Gallagher	Labour Panel	Fianna Fáil	
Paul Gavan	Labour Panel	Sinn Féin	
Terry Leyden	Labour Panel	Fianna Fáil	
Jennifer Murnane O'Connor	Labour Panel	Fianna Fáil	Elected to Dáil at the 2020 general election
Ged Nash	Labour Panel	Labour	Elected to Dáil at the 2020 general election
Joe O'Reilly	Labour Panel	Fine Gael	
Ned O'Sullivan	Labour Panel	Fianna Fáil	
Neale Richmond	Labour Panel	Fine Gael	Elected to Dáil at the 2020 general election
Alice-Mary Higgins	National University of Ireland	Independent	Member of the Civil Engagement group
Michael McDowell	National University of Ireland	Independent	Member of the Seanad Independent Group
Rónán Mullen	National University of Ireland	Independent	Member of the Seanad Independent Group
Ivana Bacik	Dublin University	Labour	
David Norris	Dublin University	Independent	Member of the Labour Technical Group
Lynn Ruane	Dublin University	Independent	Member of the Civil Engagement group
Ray Butler	Nominated by the Taoiseach	Fine Gael	
Paudie Coffey	Nominated by the Taoiseach	Fine Gael	
Frank Feighan	Nominated by the Taoiseach	Fine Gael	Elected to Dáil at the 2020 general election
Joan Freeman	Nominated by the Taoiseach	Independent	Member of the Seanad Independent Group
Colette Kelleher	Nominated by the Taoiseach	Independent	Member of the Civil Engagement group
Billy Lawless	Nominated by the Taoiseach	Independent	Member of the Seanad Independent Group
Michelle Mulherin	Nominated by the Taoiseach	Fine Gael	
Pádraig Ó Céidigh	Nominated by the Taoiseach	Independent	Member of the Seanad Independent Group
Marie-Louise O'Donnell	Nominated by the Taoiseach	Independent	
John O'Mahony	Nominated by the Taoiseach	Fine Gael	
James Reilly	Nominated by the Taoiseach	Fine Gael	
Seán Kyne	Nominated by the Taoiseach	Fine Gael	Nominated on 20 February 2020 to fill vacancy

== Changes ==
Date	Panel	Loss	Gain	Note
15 December 2016	Agricultural Panel	Fianna Fáil	Independent	Brian Ó Domhnaill resigns from Fianna Fáil
28 November 2017	Agricultural Panel	Labour		Denis Landy resigns from the Seanad
30 November 2017	Agricultural Panel	Sinn Féin	Independent	Trevor Ó Clochartaigh resigns from Sinn Féin
5 February 2018	Agricultural Panel	Independent		Trevor Ó Clochartaigh resigns from the Seanad on appointment to role within TG4
27 April 2018	Agricultural Panel		Ind. Unionist	Ian Marshall elected in a by-election
27 April 2018	Agricultural Panel		Fine Gael	Anthony Lawlor elected in a by-election
1 July 2019	Agricultural Panel	Green		Grace O'Sullivan elected at the 2019 European Parliament election in May 2019
1 November 2019	Agricultural Panel		Green	Pippa Hackett elected unopposed in a by-election
8 February 2020	Industrial and Commercial Panel	Fine Gael		Colm Burke elected to the 33rd Dáil
8 February 2020	Agricultural Panel	Sinn Féin		Rose Conway-Walsh elected to the 33rd Dáil
8 February 2020	Nominated by the Taoiseach	Fine Gael		Frank Feighan elected to the 33rd Dáil
8 February 2020	Industrial and Commercial Panel	Sinn Féin		Pádraig Mac Lochlainn elected to the 33rd Dáil
8 February 2020	Labour Panel	Fianna Fáil		Jennifer Murnane O'Connor elected to the 33rd Dáil
8 February 2020	Labour Panel	Labour		Ged Nash elected to the 33rd Dáil
8 February 2020	Industrial and Commercial Panel	Labour		Aodhán Ó Ríordáin elected to the 33rd Dáil
8 February 2020	Cultural and Educational Panel	Fine Gael		Kieran O'Donnell elected to the 33rd Dáil
8 February 2020	Labour Panel	Fine Gael		Neale Richmond elected to the 33rd Dáil
19 February 2020	Nominated by the Taoiseach		Fine Gael	Seán Kyne nominated to fill vacancy, replacing Frank Feighan
