= Occupied Territories Bill =

Proposed Irish law

The Occupied Territories Bill (OTB; Irish: Bille na gCríocha faoi Fhorghabháil) is an Irish law that seeks to ban trade with settlements illegally established in occupied territories, including Israeli settlements. Originally called the Control of Economic Activity (Occupied Territories) Bill 2018, the original draft bill sought to criminalise "trade with and economic support for illegal settlements in territories deemed occupied under international law". Under the 2018 proposal, violators would face fines of up to €250,000 and up to five years in prison. The 2018 bill was superseded, in June 2025, by the Israeli Settlements (Prohibition of Importation of Goods) Bill 2025. The 2025 bill, which was brought to Cabinet by Tánaiste Simon Harris, excluded trade in services with Israeli occupied territories from the provisions of the bill. It was ultimately signed into law as the Israeli Settlements in the Occupied Palestinian Territories (Prohibition of Importation of Goods) Act 2026 on 23 July 2026 by President Catherine Connolly.

== Progress of the legislation ==
=== Initial response ===
The 2018 bill was tabled in the Oireachtas by independent senator Frances Black in January 2018, who stated that "trade in settlement goods sustains injustice". She consulted Sadaka, Trócaire, Christian Aid, Amnesty International, the Irish Congress of Trade Unions (ICTU) and the Global Legal Action Network (GLAN) during the drafting process. The bill was co-sponsored by Senators Colette Kelleher, David Norris, Lynn Ruane, Alice-Mary Higgins, Grace O'Sullivan and John Dolan. It was supported by the parties Fianna Fáil, Sinn Féin, the Labour Party, Solidarity–People Before Profit, the Green Party, the Social Democrats, and independents. It has also been supported by the Ireland Palestine Solidarity Campaign.

The bill was passed by majorities in both the Seanad (upper house) and the Dáil (lower house). Fianna Fáil foreign affairs spokesperson Niall Collins introduced the bill in the Dáil, saying that his party's support was due to "[increasing concern] about the actions of Israel and its continued and blatant disregard for international law". Sinn Féin's strong showing in the 2020 Irish general election led to speculation that the bill would be advanced by the new government, although the bill was not an election issue. Sinn Féin and Fianna Fáil both indicated in their manifestos that they wished to see the OTB enacted.

The Fine Gael party opposed the bill. Former Irish Fine Gael politician Alan Shatter, in an opinion piece for the Jerusalem Post noted that, even if the bill is passed, the foreign ministry could decline to implement it. In December 2019, Foreign Minister Simon Coveney, on a trip to Israel, said that the government had "effectively blocked" the bill.

=== Impact of 2024 ICJ advisory opinion ===
There was renewed impetus in the Bill in 2024 when the government sought legal advice from the Attorney General following the International Court of Justice's advisory opinion on Israel's occupation of the Palestinian territories. Following the Attorney General's advice the Tánaiste and Minister for Foreign Affairs, Micheál Martin confirmed on 22 October 2024 that the Bill would be "reviewed and amendments prepared in order to bring in into line with the Constitution and EU Law". This move was strongly criticised by the Israeli Ambassador to Ireland, Dana Erlich, who claimed the Bill was a "discriminatory attempt to target Israel" and that the proposed legislation was "anti-Israel". On 31 October 2024, it was reported that a technical blockage of the Bill would be removed to allow it to proceed to committee stage, however the Bill was not passed before the Dáil was suspended sine die on the 7 November 2024 marking the end of the 33rd Dáil. It was later reported that the US Ambassador to Ireland, Claire Cronin, had written to the government expressing concern about the Bill saying that "American companies located in Ireland could be inadvertently caught up in this legislation, and could be damaged as a result of that", however Minister Martin said that the intervention would not stop Ireland from passing the legislation.

At a televised general election debate ahead of the 2024 Irish general election, all ten party leaders voiced support for passing the Occupied Territories Bill. In January 2025, a Programme for Government agreed between Fianna Fáil, Fine Gael and a group of Independent TDs committed to "Progress legislation prohibiting goods from Occupied Palestinian Territories following the July 2024 International Court of Justice Advisory Opinion." This was seen as a watering down of the pre-election commitment as it only referred to goods and not services, and fell short of committing to pass or enact the bill.

=== Proposed new legislation ===
On 19 January 2025, incoming Taoiseach, Micheál Martin confirmed that the existing bill would be scrapped and replaced by new legislation. This move was criticised by the author of the original bill, Senator Frances Black, and by campaigners for the bill who protested outside the Dáil later that week. Green Party leader, Roderic O'Gorman criticised the incoming government's "narrowing of the scope of the bill", arguing that the existing bill should be amended in response to legal concerns rather than being replaced. He characterised the government's proposal as a "delaying tactic" and a "complete u-turn" from the position taken by the government parties during the general election.

On 5 February 2025, Sinn Féin TD, Donnchadh Ó Laoghaire tabled a Dáil motion calling for the original bill to be passed without further delay noting that all parties had committed to passing the bill during the 2024 General Election campaign and accusing the government of "dragging their feet" on the issue. A vote on the motion was deferred until the following week.

On 11 February 2025, the Tánaiste, Simon Harris confirmed that services would not be included in the proposed legislation. This was criticised by Sinn Féin foreign affairs spokesperson, Donnchadh Ó Laoghaire and by Senator Frances Black. On 17 February, the Taoiseach, Micheál Martin confirmed that the bill would not be ready before the summer Dáil recess.

On 14 March 2025, the American Jewish Committee claimed that Micheál Martin had told them that the legislation was "no longer on the legislative calendar", following a meeting during his St Patrick's Day visit to the US. Martin later denied he had said this and reaffirmed the government's position that a new bill would be prepared.

In May 2025, the Cabinet approved the drafting of legislation to ban trade in goods (but not services) with the occupied Palestinian territories. The bill was scheduled for pre-legislative scrutiny at the Oireachtas Committee on Foreign Affairs before the 2025 summer recess. Senator Frances Black welcomed the decision and called on the government to act with urgency in enacting the law. Labour's Duncan Smith criticised the government's timeline as "simply unacceptable" and urged the government to pass the legislation before the summer recess.

=== Israeli Settlements (Prohibition of Importation of Goods) Bill 2025 ===
On 24 June 2025 the Tánaiste, Simon Harris, brought the Israeli Settlements (Prohibition of Importation of Goods) Bill 2025 to the Cabinet which approved its progress to prelegislative scrutiny. The bill, if enacted, would make it an offence under the Customs Act to import goods from Israeli settlements in the occupied territories.

In July 2025, the bill was debated at the Oireachtas Committee on Foreign Affairs and Trade. There was criticism of the bill by some representatives of Ireland's Jewish community including former Minister for Justice, Alan Shatter who stated that the bill contained "anti-Semitic symbolism" as it did not cover imports from "any other occupied territory". Business group, Ibec expressed concerns about the potential for "international reputational damage" if the bill was enacted. It also stated that it would be "incredibly difficult" for businesses to implement a ban on services from the Occupied Territories.

US Ambassador to Israel, Mike Huckabee described the bill as an act of "diplomatic intoxication" calling on Ireland to "sober up" and apologise to the Israeli Ministry of Foreign Affairs. There was further criticism from several members of US Congress including Lindsey Graham and Lisa McClain. This criticism was rejected by Taoiseach Micheál Martin, with other Irish politicians expressing concern that Huckabee's comments were "xenophobic" and based on "old tropes of the drunken Irish".

By November 2025 there had been no progress in passing the bill and Senator Black along with leaders of five of the opposition parties announced their support for a Dáil motion by People Before Profit's Richard Boyd Barrett calling for the bill to be enacted before the end of the year. The motion was subsequently passed without opposition from the government. In May 2026 it was reported that the government had decided to proceed with the legislation without the ban on services. Opposition politicians in the Dáil described it as a "half-hearted measure which is more symbolic than impactful" with 70% of trade with the Occupied Territories outside the scope of the legislation. The Taoiseach confirmed that just €200,000 worth of "goods, fruit and vegetables" comes from the settlements. The Irish Human Rights and Equality Commission argued that there was no legal basis for the government's decision to exclude services from the bill.

The Israeli Settlements in the Occupied Palestinian Territories (Prohibition of Importation of Goods) Bill was ultimately signed into law by President Catherine Connolly on 23 July 2026.

== Potential effects ==
=== 2018 bill ===
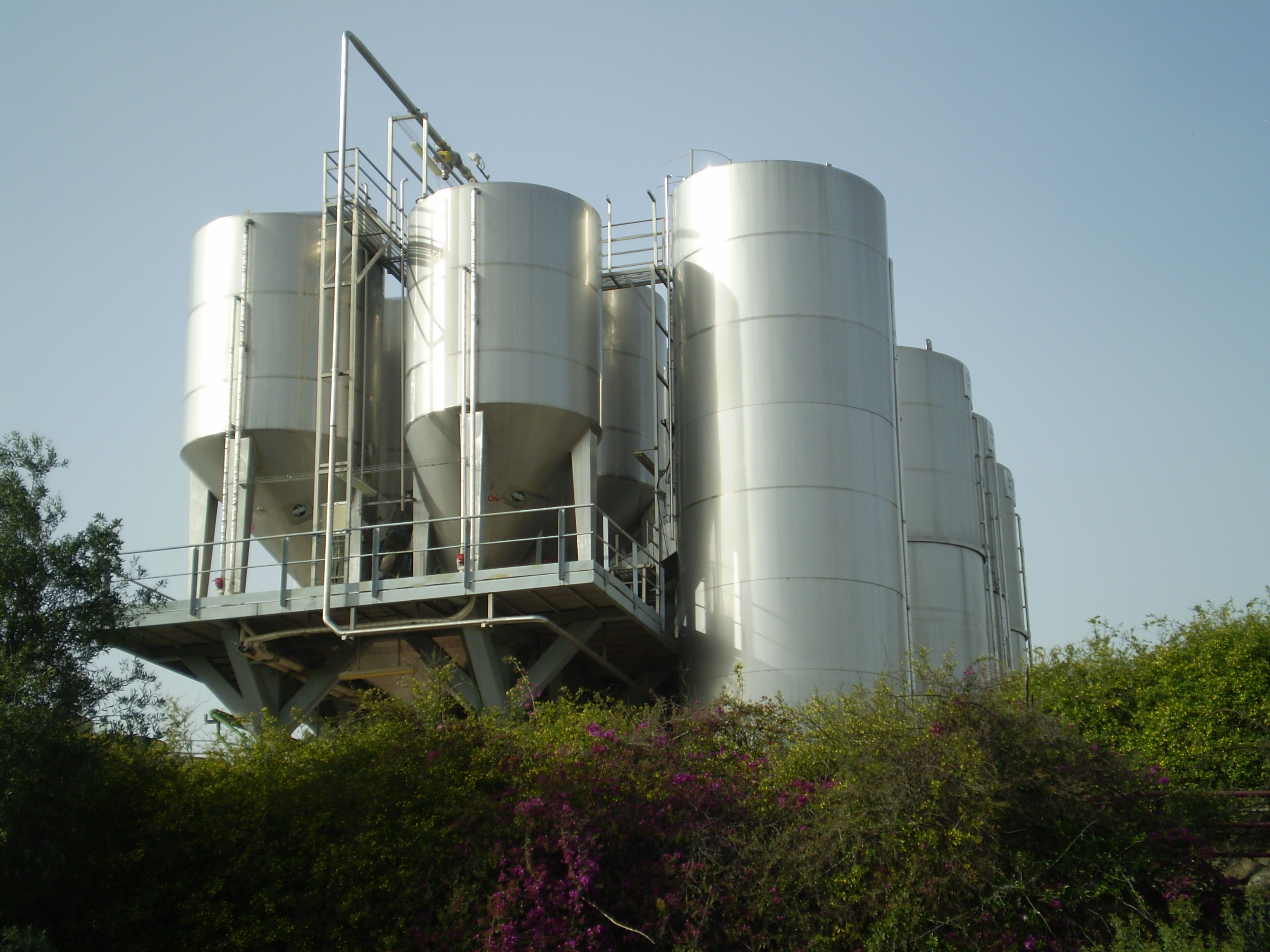
Purchasing products of the Golan Heights Winery could be punishable by up to five years in jail.

Trócaire estimates that, as of 2019, Irish imports from Israeli settlements amount to between €500,000 and €1,500,000 each year, out of €50 million total Irish imports. Ireland had a $1 billion trade surplus with Israel, exporting more than $1.2 billion to the country in 2018. However in 2024, Ireland had a trade deficit of €4 billion, becoming Israel's 4th largest export market.

The bill would ban any goods or services produced, even partially, in the Israeli-occupied territories—including the Golan Heights—or by Israelis who travel, even temporarily, beyond the Green Line. It affects goods or services imported to Ireland as well as the transactions of Irish citizens, Irish companies, and companies with Irish subsidiaries worldwide. The effects of this would cause companies operating in Israel, Ireland and the United States to choose between obeying the Irish law or United States anti-boycott legislation. An op-ed published by Bloomberg and a press release from the Lawfare Project suggested that the legislation could impact multi-national technology companies headquartered in Ireland.

According to foreign minister Simon Coveney—relying on legal advice from the Attorney General of Ireland, Séamus Woulfe—the law could result in Ireland being fined by the European Union for violating EU trade regulation. Woulfe also said that the law would be "quite vague" and impractical to enforce. The Lawfare Project is already preparing a lawsuit against the legislation on the grounds that it violates European Union law. The Ireland Palestine Alliance, Sadaka, noting that one key argument by Coveney and the Government is that the Bill is not compatible with EU law, point to a legal opinion by Takis Tridimas, Professor of EU law at King's College London and practising EU lawyer, that the Bill is compatible with EU law. Other legal authorities, including former Attorney General Michael McDowell argue that the bill would not contravene existing law or international obligations. Trócaire cites two formal legal opinions that the bill is legal and permissible under EU law.

Jackie Goodall of the Ireland Israel Alliance stated that Christian pilgrims could be adversely affected, as taking tours guided by settlers based in the West Bank or buying souvenirs from settlers in the West Bank would be a criminal action.

== International reaction ==
Various American officials contacted Coveney, warning that commercial relations between their countries could be adversely affected by the passage of the bill. Several politicians from Massachusetts—a state with a large Irish-American population—have criticised the bill. This includes criticism from Steven S. Howitt, a state representative, Boston Mayor Marty Walsh, and Mintz Levin chairman Robert Popeo, who characterised the bill as antisemitic. Indiana's Secretary of Commerce, James A. Schellinger, expressed concern that the bill would "unfairly target certain countries or groups of people" and harm Indiana businesses. In a letter signed by ten United States Members of Congress, signatories warned of "potentially severe implications" to Ireland's economy. Fianna Fáil foreign affairs spokesman Niall Collins characterised this as a "veiled threat to Ireland". In response, the Taoiseach Leo Varadkar wrote to members of the House of Representatives emphasizing his government's opposition to the bill. Following the revival of the Bill in 2024 a senior US diplomat had reportedly warned Tánaiste Micheál Martin of "consequences" if the Bill was enacted.

The Israeli embassy in Ireland called the bill "immoral" and stated that "Closing doors will not in any way facilitate Ireland's role and influence." Defence minister Avigdor Lieberman proposed shuttering Israel's embassy in Dublin. Benjamin Netanyahu, the Prime Minister of Israel, stated that the bill is "utterly contrary to the principles of free trade and justice". President of Israel Isaac Herzog wrote to Coveney, stating that the legislation "sets a dangerous precedent which is detrimental to the relations between our countries and to the chances of resolving the Israel Palestinian conflict by a negotiated compromise". He said that the boycott might extend into Israel's 1948 borders (the borders of Israel recognized under international law), as he thought that most Irish people are not familiar with the intricacies of the Israeli-Palestinian conflict.

It has been characterised as "BDS bill" in Jewish and Israeli media. An editorial in The Jerusalem Post criticised the omission of other territories considered occupied under international law in the debate over the bill, such as Turkish Cyprus, Western Sahara, and the Crimea. According to Trocaire the legislation would apply to territories where there is a clear international legal consensus on the status of the occupation. Currently only the occupied Palestinian territories have been confirmed as occupied by the International Court of Justice but it allows for other territories to be included so long as there is consensus between the Minister for Foreign Affairs & Trade and both houses of the Oireachtas.

In July 2025, the bill was met with opposition from 16 Republican members of the US House of Representatives (namely Claudia Tenney, Nick LaLota, David Schweikert, Elise Stefanik, Andy Ogles, Joe Wilson, Pete Stauber, Chuck Edwards, Keith Self, Barry Moore, Mark Messmer, Harriet Hageman, Andrew Garbarino, Buddy Carter, Ben Cline and Mike Turner), who sent a formal letter to Secretary of the Treasury Scott Bessent demanding that Ireland be added to a special list of countries boycotting Israel in the event that the legislation – described as "discriminatory, dangerous, and [in violation of] US law" – is passed; in the letter, the group additionally questioned the notion that Palestine and the Golan Heights are occupied, and referred to the West Bank as "Judea and Samaria". In early August, Simon Harris stated the government's intention to advance the bill and implement it by January 2026, amid Israeli threats to "fully occupy" the Gaza Strip in the final stages of its invasion and genocide in the territory.
