= 27th Seanad =

Members of the Seanad from 2025

←	26th Seanad

Overview
- Legislative body: Seanad Éireann
- Jurisdiction: Ireland
- Meeting place: Leinster House
- Term: 12 February 2025 – present
- Election: 29–30 January 2025
- Government: 35th government of Ireland
- Members: 60
- Cathaoirleach: Mark Daly (FF)
- Leas-Chathaoirleach: Maria Byrne (FG)
- Leader of the Seanad: Garret Ahearn (FG)
- Deputy leader of the Seanad: Fiona O'Loughlin (FF)
- Leader of the Opposition: Conor Murphy (SF)

Sessions
- 1st: 12 February 2025 – 17 July 2025
- 2nd: 23 September 2025 – 16 July 2026
- 3rd: 22 September 2026 –

The 27th Seanad has been in office since February 2025. The 2025 Seanad election took place in January 2025, following the 2024 general election to the 34th Dáil on 29 November 2024. It was fully composed on 7 February 2025 on the nomination of members by the Taoiseach.

It is the first Seanad to have a member from Aontú, as well as the first senator elected for the Social Democrats. (Note: Senator James Heffernan joined the Social Democrats in September 2015; he had been elected as a Labour candidate in 2011 and lost the whip in 2012. Heffernan was a Social Democrat Senator for nine months until the 24th Seanad was dissolved in June 2016, but was never elected as a Social Democrat candidate.)

== Background ==
The Constitution of Ireland requires a general election for Seanad Éireann, the senate of the Oireachtas, to take place no later than ninety days after the dissolution of Dáil Éireann. There are 60 seats in the Seanad: 43 were elected on five vocational panels by serving politicians; 6 were elected in two university constituencies; and 11 are nominated by the taoiseach who was appointed after the assembly of the 34th Dáil. It will remain in office until the close of poll for the 28th Seanad.

The 33rd Dáil was dissolved on 8 November 2024. On 15 November 2024, the Minister for Housing, Local Government and Heritage, Darragh O'Brien, signed orders for the Seanad election, providing 29 January as the deadline for ballots in the university constituencies and 30 January as the deadline for ballots for the vocational panels. Under the Seanad Electoral (University Members) (Amendment) Act 2024, this is to be the last Seanad in which the two university constituencies will exist. At the next Seanad general election, they will be replaced by a new Higher Education constituency.

On 7 February 2025, the Taoiseach, Micheál Martin, nominated eleven members with their prior consent to be members of the Seanad.

== Cathaoirleach ==
- Cathaoirleach
  - Senator Mark Daly (12 February 2025 – present)
- Leas-Cathaoirleach
  - Senator Maria Byrne (19 February 2025 – present)

On 12 February 2025, Mark Daly (FF) was proposed as Cathaoirleach by Fiona O'Loughlin (FF) and seconded by Shane Curley (FF). He was elected without a division.

On 19 February 2025, Maria Byrne (FG) was proposed as Leas-Chathaoirleach by Seán Kyne (FG) and seconded by Joe O'Reilly (FG). Eileen Flynn (Ind) was proposed by Frances Black (Ind) and seconded by Nessa Cosgrove (Lab). Byrne was elected by a vote of 36 to 15.

== Composition of the 27th Seanad ==
Origin Party		Vocational panels					NUI	DU	Nominated	Total
Origin Party		Admin	Agri	Cult & Educ	Ind & Comm	Labour	NUI	DU	Nominated	Total
●	Fianna Fáil	3	3	1	3	3	0	0	6	19
●	Fine Gael	2	4	2	2	3	0	0	5	18
	Sinn Féin	1	1	1	1	2	0	0	0	6
	Labour Party	0	0	0	1	1	0	0	0	2
	Green Party	0	1	0	0	0	0	0	0	1
	Aontú	0	1	0	0	0	0	0	0	1
	Social Democrats	0	0	0	0	1	0	0	0	1
	Independent	1	1	1	2	1	3	3	0	12
Total		7	11	5	9	11	3	3	11	60

Government parties are denoted with bullets (●).

=== Effect of changes ===
	Feb. 2025 (Note: Composition after the 2025 Seanad election and the completion of nominations by the taoiseach.)	Nov. 2026 (Note: Composition following the election of Ray McAdam to the Seanad.)
Fianna Fáil	19	19
Fine Gael	18	17
Sinn Féin	6	6
Labour	2	2
Aontú	1	1
Green	1	1
Social Democrats	1	1
Independent	12	13
Total	60	

=== Gender composition ===
27 of the 60 Senators elected or appointed to the 27th Seanad in the 2025 Seanad election were women. This represents 45% of all members of the Seanad, the highest number of women senators to date. This compares to 25.5% of women who made up the membership of the 34th Dáil following the 2024 general election.

== List of senators ==
The members of the 27th Seanad are listed by panel, constituency, or those nominated. +: New senator.
#: Member of the 33rd Dáil who was not re-elected at the 2024 general election.

Panel	Name	Portrait	Party affiliation (Technical group)		Assumed office
Panel	Name	Portrait	Start of Seanad term	Current	Assumed office
Administrative Panel	Garret Ahearn		Fine Gael		29 June 2020
Administrative Panel	Martin Conway		Fine Gael	Independent; Resigned from Fine Gael in Feb. 2025	25 May 2011
Administrative Panel	Mark Daly		Fianna Fáil		13 September 2007
Administrative Panel	Eileen Flynn		Independent (Civil Engagement Group)		29 June 2020
Administrative Panel	Fiona O'Loughlin		Fianna Fáil		29 June 2020
Administrative Panel	Nicole Ryan		Sinn Féin		30 January 2025
Administrative Panel	Diarmuid Wilson		Fianna Fáil		12 September 2002
Agricultural Panel	Niall Blaney		Fianna Fáil		29 June 2020
Agricultural Panel	Paraic Brady		Fine Gael		30 January 2025
Agricultural Panel	Victor Boyhan		Independent		8 June 2016
Agricultural Panel	Maria Byrne		Fine Gael		21 April 2021
Agricultural Panel	Joanne Collins		Sinn Féin		30 January 2025
Agricultural Panel	Teresa Costello		Fianna Fáil		30 January 2025
Agricultural Panel	Paul Daly		Fianna Fáil		8 June 2016
Agricultural Panel	Eileen Lynch		Fine Gael		30 January 2025
Agricultural Panel	P. J. Murphy		Fine Gael		30 January 2025
Agricultural Panel	Malcolm Noonan		Green Party		30 January 2025
Agricultural Panel	Sarah O'Reilly		Aontú		30 January 2025
Cultural and Educational Panel	Cathal Byrne		Fine Gael		30 January 2025
Cultural and Educational Panel	Joe Conway		Independent		30 January 2025
Cultural and Educational Panel	Shane Curley		Fianna Fáil		30 January 2025
Cultural and Educational Panel	Seán Kyne		Fine Gael	Elected to the 34th Dáil on 24 May 2026.	20 February 2020
Cultural and Educational Panel	Pauline Tully		Sinn Féin		30 January 2025
Cultural and Educational Panel	Ray McAdam		Elected in 2026 by-election	Fine Gael	6 November 2026
Industrial and Commercial Panel	Frances Black		Independent (Civil Engagement Group)		8 June 2016
Industrial and Commercial Panel	Ollie Crowe		Fianna Fáil		29 June 2020
Industrial and Commercial Panel	Aidan Davitt		Fianna Fáil		8 June 2016
Industrial and Commercial Panel	Mary Fitzpatrick		Fianna Fáil		29 June 2020
Industrial and Commercial Panel	Laura Harmon		Labour		30 January 2025
Industrial and Commercial Panel	Garret Kelleher		Fine Gael		30 January 2025
Industrial and Commercial Panel	Sharon Keogan		Independent		29 June 2020
Industrial and Commercial Panel	Conor Murphy		Sinn Féin		30 January 2025
Industrial and Commercial Panel	Linda Nelson Murray		Fine Gael		30 January 2025
Labour Panel	Chris Andrews		Sinn Féin		30 January 2025
Labour Panel	Pat Casey		Fianna Fáil		29 June 2020
Labour Panel	Nessa Cosgrove		Labour		30 January 2025
Labour Panel	Gerard Craughwell		Independent		14 October 2014
Labour Panel	Mark Duffy		Fine Gael		30 January 2025
Labour Panel	Robbie Gallagher		Fianna Fáil		8 June 2016
Labour Panel	Mike Kennelly		Fine Gael		30 January 2025
Labour Panel	Maria McCormack		Sinn Féin		30 January 2025
Labour Panel	Margaret Murphy O'Mahony		Fianna Fáil		30 January 2025
Labour Panel	Joe O'Reilly		Fine Gael		8 June 2016
Labour Panel	Patricia Stephenson		Social Democrats		30 January 2025
National University of Ireland	Alice-Mary Higgins		Independent (Civil Engagement Group)		8 June 2016
National University of Ireland	Michael McDowell		Independent		8 June 2016
National University of Ireland	Rónán Mullen		Independent		13 September 2007
Dublin University	Tom Clonan		Independent		5 April 2022
Dublin University	Aubrey McCarthy		Independent		30 January 2025
Dublin University	Lynn Ruane		Independent (Civil Engagement Group)		8 June 2016
Taoiseach's nominees	Manus Boyle		Fine Gael		7 February 2025
Taoiseach's nominees	Nikki Bradley		Fine Gael		10 July 2024
Taoiseach's nominees	Lorraine Clifford-Lee		Fianna Fáil		8 June 2016
Taoiseach's nominees	Alison Comyn		Fianna Fáil		7 February 2025
Taoiseach's nominees	Evanne Ní Chuilinn		Fine Gael		7 February 2025
Taoiseach's nominees	Joe Flaherty		Fianna Fáil		10 December 2024
Taoiseach's nominees	Imelda Goldsboro		Fianna Fáil		7 February 2025
Taoiseach's nominees	Noel O'Donovan		Fine Gael		7 February 2025
Taoiseach's nominees	Anne Rabbitte		Fianna Fáil		10 December 2024
Taoiseach's nominees	Dee Ryan		Fianna Fáil		7 February 2025
Taoiseach's nominees	Gareth Scahill		Fine Gael		7 February 2025

== Changes ==
Date	Panel	Loss	Gain	Note
9 February 2025	Administrative Panel	Fine Gael	Independent	Martin Conway resigned from the Fine Gael parliamentary party
24 May 2026	Cultural and Educational Panel	Fine Gael		Seán Kyne elected to the 34th Dáil for Galway West
6 November 2026	Cultural and Educational Panel		Fine Gael	Ray McAdam elected to succeed Kyne
