= Civil Engagement group =

Civil Engagement group Grúpa Comhpháirteachas Phoiblí
- Founded: 25 May 2016
- Seanad Éireann: 4 / 60

Website
- seanadceg.ie

The Civil Engagement group (Irish: Grúpa Comhpháirteachas Phoiblí) is a technical group in Seanad Éireann (the upper house of the Oireachtas or parliament of Ireland) composed of senators with a background in civic engagement organisations.

The group presently has four members in the 27th Seanad; Alice-Mary Higgins, Lynn Ruane, Frances Black and Eileen Flynn.

== History ==
The group was established in May 2016 after the election of the 25th Seanad, initially by independent senators Alice-Mary Higgins, Frances Black, Lynn Ruane and John Dolan, along with Grace O'Sullivan of the Green Party. Colette Kelleher joined the group after being nominated to the Seanad by the Taoiseach, Enda Kenny. All six were first-time senators. O'Sullivan said the group members "share an activist background and will be pursuing progressive policy".

The Civil Engagement group is separate from the "Independent group", a technical group long established within the Seanad.

Seanad technical groups do not mirror those in the Dáil; while O'Sullivan joined the Civil Engagement group in the 25th Seanad, in the 32nd Dáil, for example, Green Party TDs sat with the Social Democrats to form a group for speaking time.

Three of the six members of the technical group did not return to the 26th Seanad, beginning with the Green Party's O'Sullivan election to the European Parliament in the 2019 European Parliament elections for the South constituency. Dolan was not re-elected, and Kelleher did not seek re-election. Taoiseach's nominee Eileen Flynn joined the group on her appointment, bringing the group's parliamentary representation up to four.

All four senators were re-elected to the Seanad in 2025, but this time Flynn won her seat on the Administrative Panel.

== Composition ==
=== 25th Seanad ===
The following senators were members of the Civil Engagement group in the 25th Seanad:

- Alice-Mary Higgins (leader)
- Frances Black
- Lynn Ruane
- John Dolan
- Grace O'Sullivan
- Colette Kelleher

=== 26th & 27th Seanad ===
The following senators are members of the Civil Engagement group in the 26th and 27th Seanad:

- Alice-Mary Higgins (leader)
- Frances Black
- Eileen Flynn
- Lynn Ruane
