= 26th Seanad =

Members of the Seanad from 2020 to 2025

←	25th Seanad	27th Seanad	→

Overview
- Legislative body: Seanad Éireann
- Jurisdiction: Ireland
- Meeting place: Leinster House
- Term: 29 June 2020 – 30 January 2025
- Election: 30–31 March 2020
- Government: 32nd government of Ireland (2020–2022); 33rd government of Ireland (2022–2024); 34th government of Ireland (2024)
- Members: 60
- Cathaoirleach: Mark Daly (FF) (2020–2022); Jerry Buttimer (FG) (2022–2024)
- Leas-Chathaoirleach: Jerry Buttimer (FG) (2020); Joe O'Reilly (FG) (2020–2022); Mark Daly (FF) (2022–2025)
- Leader of the Seanad: Regina Doherty (FG) (2020–2022); Lisa Chambers (FF) (2022–2025)
- Deputy leader of the Seanad: Lisa Chambers (FF) (2020–2022); Regina Doherty (FG) (2022–2024); Seán Kyne (FG) (2024–2025)
- Leader of the Opposition: Ivana Bacik (Lab) (2020–2021); Rebecca Moynihan (Lab) (2021–2025)

Sessions
- 1st: 29 June 2020 – 31 July 2020
- 2nd: 16 September 2020 – 16 July 2021
- 3rd: 21 September 2021 – 14 July 2022
- 4th: 14 September 2022 – 13 July 2023
- 5th: 26 September 2023 – 17 July 2024
- 6th: 24 September 2024 – 30 January 2025

The 26th Seanad was in office from 2020 to 2025. The 2020 Seanad election followed the 2020 general election to the 33rd Dáil on 8 February. The Constitution of Ireland required a general election for Seanad Éireann, the senate of the Oireachtas (Irish parliament), to take place no later than ninety days after the dissolution of the 32nd Dáil on 14 January 2020. There are 60 seats in the Seanad: 43 were elected on five vocational panels by serving politicians, for which polling closed on 30 March 2020; 6 were elected in two university constituencies, for which polling closed on 31 March 2020; and 11 were nominated by the Taoiseach (Micheál Martin) on 27 June 2020. It remained in office until the close of poll for the 27th Seanad, on 30 January 2025.

Of the 60 members, twenty-four (40%) were women, and thirty (50%) were first-time senators. Five senators (8%) were members of the LGBT+ community. 33 members (55%) of the 26th Seanad were unsuccessful candidates at the 2020 general election, 10 of those (17%) being outgoing TDs who failed to get re-elected. In total 41 members (68%) of the 26th Seanad had contested general elections in the past, while 15 (25%) were former TDs. Eileen Flynn became the first Irish Traveller woman to be a member of the Seanad.

== Electoral system ==
There are 60 seats in the Seanad: 43 senators are elected by vocational panels, six elected by the two university constituencies, and eleven are nominated by the Taoiseach. Three seats are elected by graduates of the four colleges of the National University of Ireland (University College Cork, University College Dublin, University of Galway and Maynooth University) and three seats are elected by graduates of Dublin University (as Trinity College Dublin is the sole constituent college, this is often referred to as the Trinity College constituency).

Article 18.8 of the Constitution requires that an election for Seanad Éireann take place not later than 90 days after a dissolution of the Dáil. On 21 January, Minister for Housing, Planning and Local Government Eoghan Murphy signed the orders for the Seanad election.

== Timetable ==
- 24 February 2020: deadline for proposals for nominations to the vocational panels by nominating bodies (civic society groups)
- 2 March 2020: deadline for proposals for nominations to the vocational panels by Members of the Oireachtas (President of Ireland, TDs and Senators)
- 9 March 2020: Seanad Returning Officer completed the panels of candidates
- 16 March 2020: postal balloting began
- 30 March 2020, 11 a.m.: polling closed for the five special panels, counting of votes commences
- 31 March 2020, 11 a.m.: polling closed in the two university constituencies
- 27 June 2020: Taoiseach's nominees announced

== Cathaoirleach ==
- Cathaoirleach
  - Mark Daly (29 June 2020 – 16 December 2022)
  - Jerry Buttimer (16 December 2022 – 3 December 2024)
  - Vacant (since 3 December 2024)
- Leas-Cathaoirleach
  - Jerry Buttimer (29 June 2020 – 21 August 2020)
  - Joe O'Reilly (22 August 2020 – 16 December 2022)
  - Mark Daly (16 December 2022 – 29 January 2025)

The coalition agreement between Fianna Fáil, Fine Gael, and the Green Party saw a rotation between the role of Taoiseach between the leaders of Fianna Fáil and Fine Gael. Fianna Fáil leader Micheál Martin served as Taoiseach from June 2020 to December 2022, with Fine Gael leader Leo Varadkar serving as Taoiseach from that date, with Simon Harris succeeding as Fine Gael leader and Taoiseach in April 2024. Similarly, the agreement provided that the position of Cathaoirleach in the Seanad would rotate between the parties.

On 29 June 2020, Mark Daly was proposed as Cathaoirleach by Lisa Chambers (FF) and seconded by Denis O'Donovan (FF). Niall Ó Donnghaile (SF) was proposed by Paul Gavan (SF) and seconded by Elisha McCallion (SF). Daly was elected by a vote of 46 to 6. On 7 July 2020, Jerry Buttimer (FG) was proposed as Leas-Cathaoirleach by Martin Conway (FG) and seconded by Diarmuid Wilson (FF). Fintan Warfield (SF) was proposed by Niall Ó Donnghaile (SF) and seconded by Lynn Boylan (SF). Buttimer was elected by a vote of 43 to 6.

On 21 August 2020, following his involvement in the Oireachtas Golf Society scandal, Buttimer resigned as Leas-Cathaoirleach. On 18 September 2020, Joe O'Reilly (FG) was proposed as Leas-Cathaoirleach by Regina Doherty (FG) and seconded by John McGahon (FG). Fintan Warfield (SF) was proposed by Niall Ó Donnghaile (SF) and seconded by Elisha McCallion (SF). O'Reilly was elected to the position.

On 16 December 2022, Daly resigned as Cathaoirleach and O'Reilly resigned as Leas-Cathaoirleach. Jerry Buttimer was proposed by Regina Doherty and seconded by Diarmuid Wilson. Victor Boyhan (Ind) was proposed by Alice-Mary Higgins (Ind) and seconded by Tom Clonan (Ind). Buttimer was elected by a vote of 35 to 8. This was followed by the election of Mark Daly as Leas-Cathaoirleach. He was proposed by Lisa Chambers (FF) and seconded by Regina Doherty and elected unopposed.

Jerry Buttimer was elected to the 34th Dáil at the 2024 general election held on 29 November, leaving the office of Cathaoirleach vacant.

== Composition of the 26th Seanad ==

Origin Party		Vocational panels					NUI	DU	Nominated	Total
Origin Party		Admin	Agri	Cult & Educ	Ind & Comm	Labour	NUI	DU	Nominated	Total
●	Fianna Fáil	3	4	2	3	4	0	0	4	20
●	Fine Gael	2	3	2	2	3	0	0	4	16
	Sinn Féin	1	1	1	1	1	0	0	0	5
	Labour Party	1	1	0	1	1	0	1	0	5
●	Green Party	0	1	0	0	1	0	0	2	4
	Independent	0	1	0	2	1	3	2	1	10
Total		7	11	5	9	11	3	3	11	60

Government parties are denoted with bullets (●)

=== Effect of changes ===
This table shows the political composition of the 26th Seanad at the start of its term and after the nomination of senators to fill vacancies after the 2024 general election.

	June 2020	Dec. 2024
Fianna Fáil	20	18
Fine Gael	16	12
Sinn Féin	5	2
Labour	5	2
Green	4	5
Independent	10	11
Vacant	—N/a	10
Total	60	

== Leadership ==
=== Government ===
On its first sitting of the 26th Seanad, the government had a majority of 40 to 20. In November 2024, on the dissolution of the 33rd Dáil, the government's majority was 41 to 17, with two vacancies.

The political leadership of the Seanad rotated on 16 December 2022, the day before the rotation of the Taoiseach and Tánaiste. Outgoing Leader of the Seanad, Regina Doherty becoming Deputy leader, and outgoing Deputy Leader Lisa Chambers becoming Leader. Outgoing Government Chief Whip of the Seanad, Senator Seán Kyne of Fine Gael also swapped positions with Seanad Government Deputy Chief Whip Senator Robbie Gallagher, who took over as Seanad Chief Whip. The leadership of the Green Party group in the Seanad also changed with Senator Pauline O'Reilly stepping down as group leader to be replaced by Senator Róisín Garvey.

- Leader of the Seanad
  - Regina Doherty (27 June 2020 – 17 December 2022)
  - Lisa Chambers (17 December 2022 – 29 January 2025)
- Deputy leader of the Seanad
  - Lisa Chambers (29 June 2020 – 17 December 2022)
  - Regina Doherty (17 December 2022 – 26 June 2024)
  - Seán Kyne (26 June 2024 – 29 January 2025)
- Leader of the Green Party in the Seanad
  - Pauline O'Reilly (until 16 December 2022)
  - Róisín Garvey (16 December 2022 – 29 January 2025)

=== Opposition ===
- Leader of Sinn Féin in the Seanad: Niall Ó Donnghaile (2020–2023)
- Leader of the Labour Party in the Seanad
  - Ivana Bacik (27 June 2020 – 9 July 2021)
  - Rebecca Moynihan (September 2021 – 29 January 2025)

== List of senators ==
+: New senator.
‡: Previously served as member of the Seanad non-consecutively to the current consecutive terms of office.
#: Member of the 32nd Dáil who was not re-elected at the 2020 general election.

Panel	Name	Portrait	Party affiliation (Technical group)		Assumed office
Panel	Name	Portrait	Start of Seanad term	Current	Assumed office
Administrative Panel	Garret Ahearn		Fine Gael		29 June 2020
Administrative Panel	Martin Conway		Fine Gael		25 May 2011
Administrative Panel	Mark Daly		Fianna Fáil		13 September 2007
Administrative Panel	Rebecca Moynihan		Labour		29 June 2020
Administrative Panel	Niall Ó Donnghaile		Sinn Féin	Resigned in 2024	8 June 2016
Administrative Panel	Mal O'Hara		Elected in 2024 by-election	Green	8 April 2024
Administrative Panel	Fiona O'Loughlin		Fianna Fáil		29 June 2020
Administrative Panel	Diarmuid Wilson		Fianna Fáil		12 September 2002
Agricultural Panel	Niall Blaney		Fianna Fáil		29 June 2020
Agricultural Panel	Victor Boyhan		Independent		8 June 2016
Agricultural Panel	Lynn Boylan		Sinn Féin	Elected to the European Parliament in 2024	29 June 2020
Agricultural Panel	Paddy Burke		Fine Gael		17 February 1993
Agricultural Panel	Maria Byrne		Elected in 2021 by-election	Fine Gael	21 April 2021
Agricultural Panel	Paul Daly		Fianna Fáil		8 June 2016
Agricultural Panel	Michael D'Arcy		Fine Gael	Resigned in 2020	29 June 2020
Agricultural Panel	Pippa Hackett		Green		5 November 2019
Agricultural Panel	Annie Hoey		Labour		29 June 2020
Agricultural Panel	Tim Lombard		Fine Gael		8 June 2016
Agricultural Panel	Eugene Murphy		Fianna Fáil	Independent; Left Fianna Fáil in Nov. 2024	29 June 2020
Agricultural Panel	Denis O'Donovan		Fianna Fáil		13 September 2007
Cultural and Educational Panel	Malcolm Byrne		Fianna Fáil	Elected to the 34th Dáil on 29 November 2024.	29 June 2020
Cultural and Educational Panel	Lisa Chambers		Fianna Fáil		29 June 2020
Cultural and Educational Panel	Seán Kyne		Fine Gael		20 February 2020
Cultural and Educational Panel	John McGahon		Fine Gael		29 June 2020
Cultural and Educational Panel	Fintan Warfield		Sinn Féin		8 June 2016
Industrial and Commercial Panel	Catherine Ardagh		Fianna Fáil	Elected to the 34th Dáil on 29 November 2024.	8 June 2016
Industrial and Commercial Panel	Frances Black		Independent (Civil Engagement Group)		8 June 2016
Industrial and Commercial Panel	Micheál Carrigy		Fine Gael	Elected to the 34th Dáil on 29 November 2024.	29 June 2020
Industrial and Commercial Panel	Ollie Crowe		Fianna Fáil		29 June 2020
Industrial and Commercial Panel	Aidan Davitt		Fianna Fáil		8 June 2016
Industrial and Commercial Panel	Gerry Horkan		Elected in 2021 by-election	Fianna Fáil	21 April 2021
Industrial and Commercial Panel	Elisha McCallion		Sinn Féin	Resigned in 2020	29 June 2020
Industrial and Commercial Panel	Sharon Keogan		Independent		29 June 2020
Industrial and Commercial Panel	Mark Wall		Labour	Elected to the 34th Dáil on 29 November 2024.	29 June 2020
Industrial and Commercial Panel	Barry Ward		Fine Gael	Elected to the 34th Dáil on 29 November 2024.	29 June 2020
Labour Panel	Jerry Buttimer		Fine Gael	Elected to the 34th Dáil on 29 November 2024.	8 June 2016
Labour Panel	Pat Casey		Fianna Fáil		29 June 2020
Labour Panel	Shane Cassells		Fianna Fáil		29 June 2020
Labour Panel	Gerard Craughwell		Independent		14 October 2014
Labour Panel	John Cummins		Fine Gael	Elected to the 34th Dáil on 29 November 2024.	29 June 2020
Labour Panel	Robbie Gallagher		Fianna Fáil		8 June 2016
Labour Panel	Paul Gavan		Sinn Féin		8 June 2016
Labour Panel	Joe O'Reilly		Fine Gael		8 June 2016
Labour Panel	Pauline O'Reilly		Green		29 June 2020
Labour Panel	Ned O'Sullivan		Fianna Fáil		13 September 2007
Labour Panel	Marie Sherlock		Labour	Elected to the 34th Dáil on 29 November 2024.	29 June 2020
National University of Ireland	Alice-Mary Higgins		Independent (Civil Engagement Group)		8 June 2016
National University of Ireland	Michael McDowell		Independent		8 June 2016
National University of Ireland	Rónán Mullen		Independent		13 September 2007
Dublin University	Ivana Bacik		Labour	Elected to the Dáil in 2021	13 September 2007
Dublin University	Tom Clonan		Elected in 2022 by-election	Independent	5 April 2022
Dublin University	David Norris		Independent	Resigned in 2024	25 April 1987
Dublin University	Lynn Ruane		Independent (Civil Engagement Group)		8 June 2016
Taoiseach's nominees	Nikki Bradley		Replaced Regina Doherty	Fine Gael	10 July 2024
Taoiseach's nominees	Lorraine Clifford-Lee		Fianna Fáil		8 June 2016
Taoiseach's nominees	Emer Currie		Fine Gael	Elected to the 34th Dáil on 29 November 2024.	29 June 2020
Taoiseach's nominees	Regina Doherty		Fine Gael	Elected to the European Parliament in 2024	29 June 2020
Taoiseach's nominees	Aisling Dolan		Fine Gael		29 June 2020
Taoiseach's nominees	Timmy Dooley		Fianna Fáil	Elected to the 34th Dáil on 29 November 2024.	29 June 2020
Taoiseach's nominees	Alan Farrell		Nominated to fill a vacancy	Fine Gael	10 December 2024
Taoiseach's nominees	Mary Fitzpatrick		Fianna Fáil		29 June 2020
Taoiseach's nominees	Joe Flaherty		Nominated to fill a vacancy	Fianna Fáil	10 December 2024
Taoiseach's nominees	Eileen Flynn		Independent (Civil Engagement Group)		29 June 2020
Taoiseach's nominees	Róisín Garvey		Green		29 June 2020
Taoiseach's nominees	Vincent P. Martin		Green		29 June 2020
Taoiseach's nominees	Erin McGreehan		Fianna Fáil	Elected to the 34th Dáil on 29 November 2024.	29 June 2020
Taoiseach's nominees	Anne Rabbitte		Nominated to fill a vacancy	Fianna Fáil	10 December 2024
Taoiseach's nominees	Mary Seery Kearney		Fine Gael		29 June 2020

== Changes ==
Date	Panel	Loss	Gain	Note
28 September 2020	Agricultural Panel	Fine Gael		Michael W. D'Arcy resigns from the Seanad
29 October 2020	Industrial and Commercial Panel	Sinn Féin		Elisha McCallion resigns from the Seanad
21 April 2021	Agricultural Panel		Fine Gael	Maria Byrne elected in a by-election
21 April 2021	Industrial and Commercial Panel		Fianna Fáil	Gerry Horkan elected in a by-election
9 July 2021	Dublin University	Labour		Ivana Bacik elected to the 33rd Dáil at a by-election
31 March 2022	Dublin University		Independent	Tom Clonan elected in a by-election
22 January 2024	Administrative Panel	Sinn Féin		Niall Ó Donnghaile resigns
22 January 2024	Dublin University	Independent		David Norris resigns
25 March 2024	Administrative Panel		Green	Mal O'Hara elected unopposed in a by-election
10 July 2024	Nominated by the Taoiseach	Fine Gael		Regina Doherty resigns following her election to the European Parliament
10 July 2024	Nominated by the Taoiseach		Fine Gael	Nikki Bradley nominated to fill vacancy
16 July 2024	Agricultural Panel	Sinn Féin		Election of Lynn Boylan to the European Parliament
4 November 2024	Agricultural Panel	Fianna Fáil	Independent	Eugene Murphy left Fianna Fáil to contest the 2024 Irish general election as an independent.
29 November 2024	Industrial and Commercial Panel	Fianna Fáil		Catherine Ardagh elected to the 34th Dáil at the 2024 general election
29 November 2024	Labour Panel	Fine Gael		Jerry Buttimer elected to the 34th Dáil at the 2024 general election
29 November 2024	Cultural and Educational Panel	Fianna Fáil		Malcolm Byrne elected to the 34th Dáil at the 2024 general election
29 November 2024	Industrial and Commercial Panel	Fine Gael		Micheál Carrigy elected to the 34th Dáil at the 2024 general election
29 November 2024	Labour Panel	Fine Gael		John Cummins elected to the 34th Dáil at the 2024 general election
29 November 2024	Nominated by the Taoiseach	Fine Gael		Emer Currie elected to the 34th Dáil at the 2024 general election
29 November 2024	Nominated by the Taoiseach	Fianna Fáil		Timmy Dooley elected to the 34th Dáil at the 2024 general election
29 November 2024	Nominated by the Taoiseach	Fianna Fáil		Erin McGreehan elected to the 34th Dáil at the 2024 general election
29 November 2024	Labour Panel	Labour		Marie Sherlock elected to the 34th Dáil at the 2024 general election
29 November 2024	Industrial and Commercial Panel	Labour		Mark Wall elected to the 34th Dáil at the 2024 general election
29 November 2024	Industrial and Commercial Panel	Fine Gael		Barry Ward elected to the 34th Dáil at the 2024 general election
10 December 2024	Nominated by the Taoiseach		Fine Gael	Alan Farrell nominated to fill a vacancy
10 December 2024	Nominated by the Taoiseach		Fianna Fáil	Joe Flaherty nominated to fill a vacancy
10 December 2024	Nominated by the Taoiseach		Fianna Fáil	Anne Rabbitte nominated to fill a vacancy
