= Senator Dolan =

Senator Dolan may refer to:

- Chester A. Dolan Jr. (1907–1994), Massachusetts State Senate
- John Dolan (politician) (born 1956), Senate of Ireland
- Jonathan Dolan (born 1967), Missouri State Senate
- Matt Dolan (born 1965), Ohio State Senate
- Séamus Dolan (1914–2010), Senate of Ireland
