= Sabina Higgins =

Irish actress (born 1941)

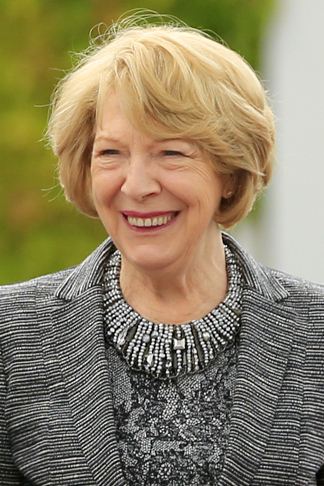
- Higgins in 2014
- Born: Sabina Coyne; 15 September 1941 (age 84); Ballindine, County Mayo, Ireland
- Education: University College Galway
- Spouse: Michael D. Higgins (m. 1974)
- Children: 4, including Alice-Mary

Sabina Higgins (née Coyne; born 15 September 1941) is an Irish actress, political activist and the wife of Michael D. Higgins, who served as the president of Ireland from 2011 to 2025.

== Early life ==
Sabina Coyne grew up on a small farm in Cloonrane, Milltown near the Galway-Mayo border. She attended national school in Ballindine, County Mayo. Her mother would tell stories from Charles Dickens while milking the cows, an influence on her later decision to take up acting, in which she trained using Stanislavski's system. She was a bridesmaid at the wedding of singer Luke Kelly to Deirdre O'Connell.

== Career ==
In 1966, she played the part of Julia Grenan in Insurrection.

Friends have spoken of her affection for the President and noted that she "has always been out campaigning with him, and she has a public presence." The Irish Times said she was "a subtle, careful and essential background presence during the presidential campaign". In 2010, before Higgins received the presidential nomination, the couple gave a radio interview together in which Higgins said she was "his rock". Presenter Miriam O'Callaghan said they had held hands all the way through.

She publicly expressed opposition to the Iraq War. In January 2014, she visited the jailed anti-war activist Margaretta D'Arcy in Limerick Prison.

During the centenary of the Easter Rising, she gave a key speech in Glasnevin Cemetery at the graveside of Constance Markievicz. In it she warned Irish people against "empires of greed" and "a new form of capitalism [which is] even more powerful and less visible and less accountable" than that of 1916.

On 27 July 2022, a letter by Higgins to the editorial office of The Irish Times was published, in which she called on Ukraine to "agree to a ceasefire and negotiations" with the Russian Federation during the 2022 Russian invasion of Ukraine. In it, she expressed her indignation at the publication's editorial, which she said "did not encourage any negotiations before a ceasefire that could lead to a peaceful settlement between the Russians, Ukrainian forces and separatists." After the letter received criticism, Higgins defended her comments, stating that she "strongly condemned the illegal Russian invasion of Ukraine".

== Personal life ==
She met Michael D. Higgins in 1969 at a party in the family home of journalist Mary Kenny. He proposed over Christmas 1973 and they married on 8 July 1974 at St Mary's Church, Haddington Road in Dublin. They celebrated 50 years of marriage in 2024. They have four children: Alice-Mary, twins John and Michael Jr., and Daniel. In November 2023, Higgins was diagnosed with breast cancer and began treatment straight away.
