= Marie-Louise O'Donnell =

Irish academic, later broadcaster and politician (born 1952)

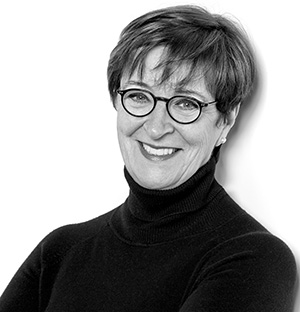

Senator
- In office 25 May 2011 – 29 June 2020
- Constituency: Nominated by the Taoiseach

Personal details
- Born: 5 September 1952 (age 73) Foxford, County Mayo, Ireland
- Party: Independent
- Children: 1
- Education: University of Nottingham; NUI Maynooth; University College Dublin; Guildhall School of Music and Drama

Marie-Louise O'Donnell (born 5 September 1952) is an Irish academic, and later broadcaster and politician, who served as a Senator from 2011 to 2020, after being nominated by the Taoiseach. She played a key role in the arts at Dublin City University over a 23-year period, including in the launch of the Helix cultural centre.

== Early life and education ==
From Foxford, County Mayo, O'Donnell is the daughter and second child of Frank O'Donnell from Foxford (relatives founded the Foxford Woolen Mills, in which her father and uncles worked) and Maire Cranny from Newry, a speech and drama teacher, still working in southern County Dublin as of 2018. The family moved to Dublin but O'Donnell and her brother spent summer and Easter holidays in Mayo.

O'Donnell studied education and English at the University of Nottingham, then took a master's degree in Education at NUI Maynooth, and another, in Modern Drama, at University College Dublin. Later she studied theatre, including direction, and voice and other acting skills, at Guildhall School of Music and Drama in London.

== Career ==
=== Education and the Arts ===
O'Donnell became head of drama at the teacher training college, Carysfort College, where she taught for ten years, until the college's closure in 1988, when she was appointed as a lecturer in the School of Communications at Dublin City University (DCU). At DCU for 23 years, she taught a range of communications and arts courses, including radio documentary making, storytelling and public speaking, and the university sent her for training at the BBC. Research interests included theatrical and radio voice performance, and ancient and modern chorus speech.

She also became involved in building the arts aspect of campus life, including DCU Arts Week, the Writer in Residence Programme, Ford Society Awards and Children's Arts Days. She worked on productions including the Larkin Concert Series, Wilde Space Theatre, Open Air Opera, RIAM graduate concerts, and a performance at DCU by the Royal Shakespeare Company. This work included a key role in the development of The Helix cultural centre, especially including its performance spaces. When the Helix launched, she took a role as associate director, and later managed the smaller of its two theatre spaces, The Space.

O'Donnell has also lectured extensively in Ireland, Europe and the US in the areas of education, and Irish culture, especially drama and language. In the early 2000s, she also spent six months as a touring actor across the UK and Ireland, in The Merry Wives of Windsor and King John with the Northern Broadsides company.

O'Donnell served two terms on the board of the National Concert Hall in the 1990s and 2000s. In 2004, she co-founded, with Andy Hinds, the theatrical company Classic Stage Ireland, which produced Shakespeare and ancient Greek drama.

=== Media ===
O'Donnell first rose to prominence in the media as a reporter on RTÉ Radio 1's Today with Pat Kenny in the summer of 2010. However, according to a friend who spoke to The Irish Times: ""It's one of those 'overnight success stories' that was actually years in the making. She trained in radio production and presentation with the BBC and presented programmes for BBC Radio 4." A colleague told the same publication "It's extraordinary the amount of people she knows and counts among her friends. Gay Byrne, Charlie McCreevy, many Fine Gael TDs – she's genuinely close to many people. I accompanied her on a trip to America at one stage and she even had a network there."

=== Political appointment ===
In May 2011, Taoiseach Enda Kenny nominated O'Donnell to the 24th Seanad. O'Donnell indicated that the appointment was a surprise, and she did not enter as a member of any party. Kenny again nominated her to the 25th Seanad in May 2016. She ousted David Norris from his role as leader of the Seanad's independent Technical Group on 29 June 2016; however, she later left the group.

=== Recent years ===
More recently, in addition to her work with RTÉ and presence in the Seanad, she has appeared as a panellist on TV3's Tonight with Vincent Browne, often featuring in the section of the programme that reviews the following morning's newspapers. She is noted for her persistent and firm defence of Enda Kenny. In March 2018 she sparked criticism after stating teenagers below the age of 18 should “stay away from politics”

O'Donnell commenced PhD studies on university teaching at St Patrick's College, Drumcondra, now the DCU Institute of Education, in 2009.

== Personal life ==
O'Donnell has one son.
