= Trevor Ó Clochartaigh =

Irish former politician (born 1968)

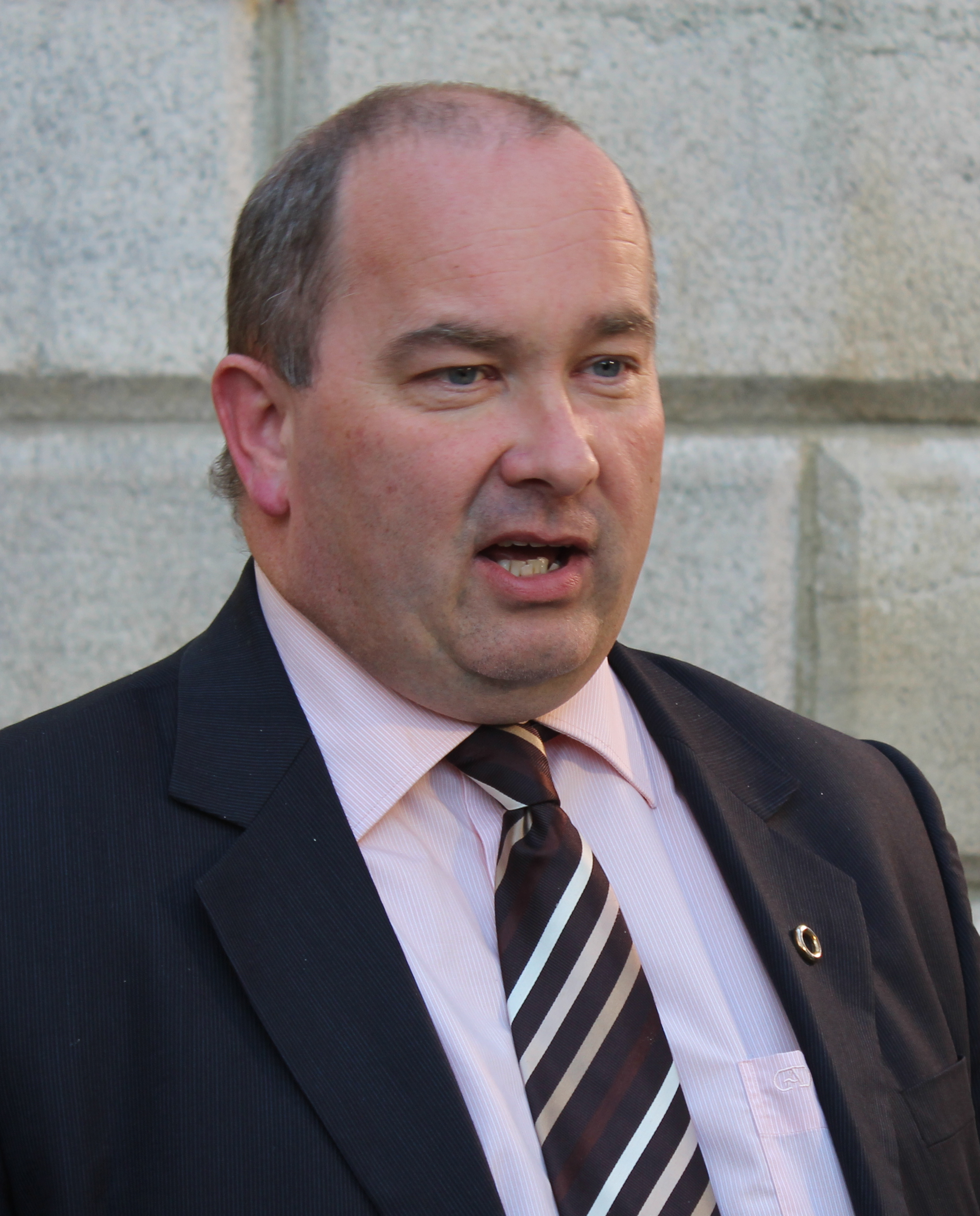

Senator
- In office 25 May 2011 – 5 February 2018
- Constituency: Agricultural Panel

Personal details
- Born: 14 March 1968 (age 58) Huddersfield, England
- Party: Independent
- Other political affiliations: Sinn Féin (2009–2017); Labour Party (1997–2009)
- Education: NUI Galway

Trevor Ó Clochartaigh (Irish pronunciation: [oː ˈklˠɔxəɾˠt̪ˠiː]; born 14 March 1968) is an Irish former politician who has served as a Senator for the Agricultural Panel from 2011 to 2018.

Ó Clochartaigh was born and raised in Huddersfield, England. His parents came from the Connemara area of County Galway. He attended NUI Galway, graduating with a Commerce degree. He worked in Irish language theatre, and is a former manager and artistic director of An Taibhdhearc. He also worked in television production as producer of Fair City and Ros na Rún, and in community development projects.

He first entered politics as a member of the Labour Party, unsuccessfully contesting the Connemara area of Galway County Council at the 2004 local elections. He subsequently left Labour and joined Sinn Féin, and was the party's candidate at the 2009 local elections and for Dáil Éireann in the Galway West constituency at the 2011 general election, but was not elected.

In April 2011, he was elected to 24th Seanad on the Agricultural Panel and was re-elected in April 2016.

In November 2017, he left Sinn Féin, citing "serious disciplinary issues" within the party. However Sinn Féin claimed that Trevor left the party because "he was worried that a democratic vote of party members in the constituency would not select him to contest the election" and that just days before his leaving he had been advocating that two candidates instead of just one should be nominated at the party's local selection convention.

He resigned from Seanad Éireann on 5 February 2018, to take up a new role at the television station TG4.
