= Paul Coghlan =

Irish politician (1944–2023)

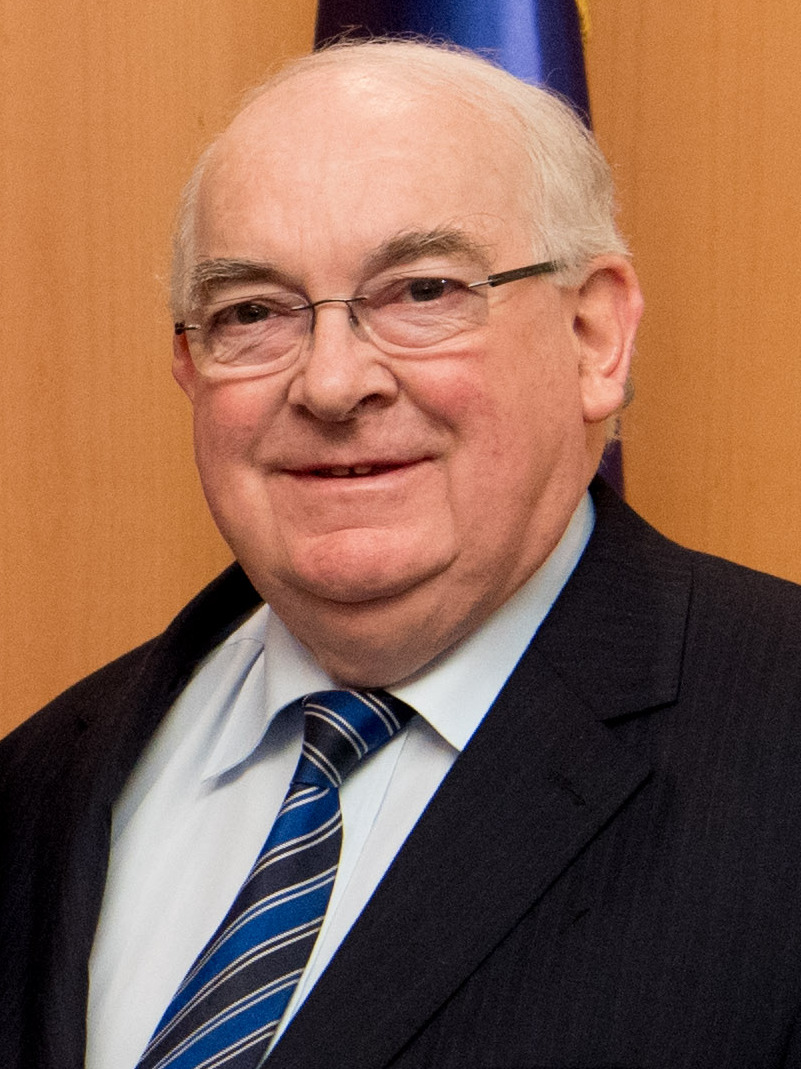
- Coghlan in 2018

Leas-Chathaoirleach of Seanad Éireann
- In office 15 June 2016 – 27 March 2020
- Cathaoirleach: Denis O'Donovan
- Preceded by: Denis O'Donovan
- Succeeded by: Jerry Buttimer

Senator
- In office 17 September 1997 – 29 June 2020
- Constituency: Industrial and Commercial Panel

Personal details
- Born: 1 June 1944 Killarney, County Kerry, Ireland
- Died: 8 June 2023 (aged 79) Killarney, County Kerry, Ireland
- Party: Fine Gael
- Spouse: Peggy Coghlan (m. 1986)
- Children: 5
- Education: University College Cork

Paul Coghlan (1 June 1944 – 8 June 2023) was an Irish Fine Gael politician who served as Leas-Chathaoirleach of Seanad Éireann from June 2016 to March 2020 and a Senator for the Industrial and Commercial Panel from 1997 to 2020.

Coghlan unsuccessfully contested the 1992 general election in the Kerry South, constituency. He then stood on the Agricultural Panel in the election to the 20th Seanad, but did not win a seat.

In 1997, he was elected to the 21st Seanad by the Industrial and Commercial Panel. He was re-elected in 2002 to the 22nd Seanad, where he was Fine Gael spokesperson on Enterprise, Trade and Employment. He was re-elected in 2007 to the 23rd Seanad, again by the Industrial and Commercial Panel.

Born in Killarney, County Kerry, he was a member and former President of the Killarney Chamber of Commerce. He was a founding director of Radio Kerry and was a trustee and former Chairperson of Muckross House. He was also a member of the Institute of Bankers in Ireland, the Life Assurance Association and the Institute of Professional Auctioneers and Valuers.

Coghlan was previously a member of Kerry County Council, Killarney Town Council and the Dingle Harbour Commissioners.

Coghlan was a member of the British–Irish Parliamentary Assembly and a member of the committee on the implementation of the Good Friday Agreement. He retired from politics in 2020 and did not contest the 2020 Seanad election.

Coghlan died on 8 June 2023, at the age of 79.
