= Lynn Ruane =

Irish politician (born 1984)

Senator Lynn Ruane
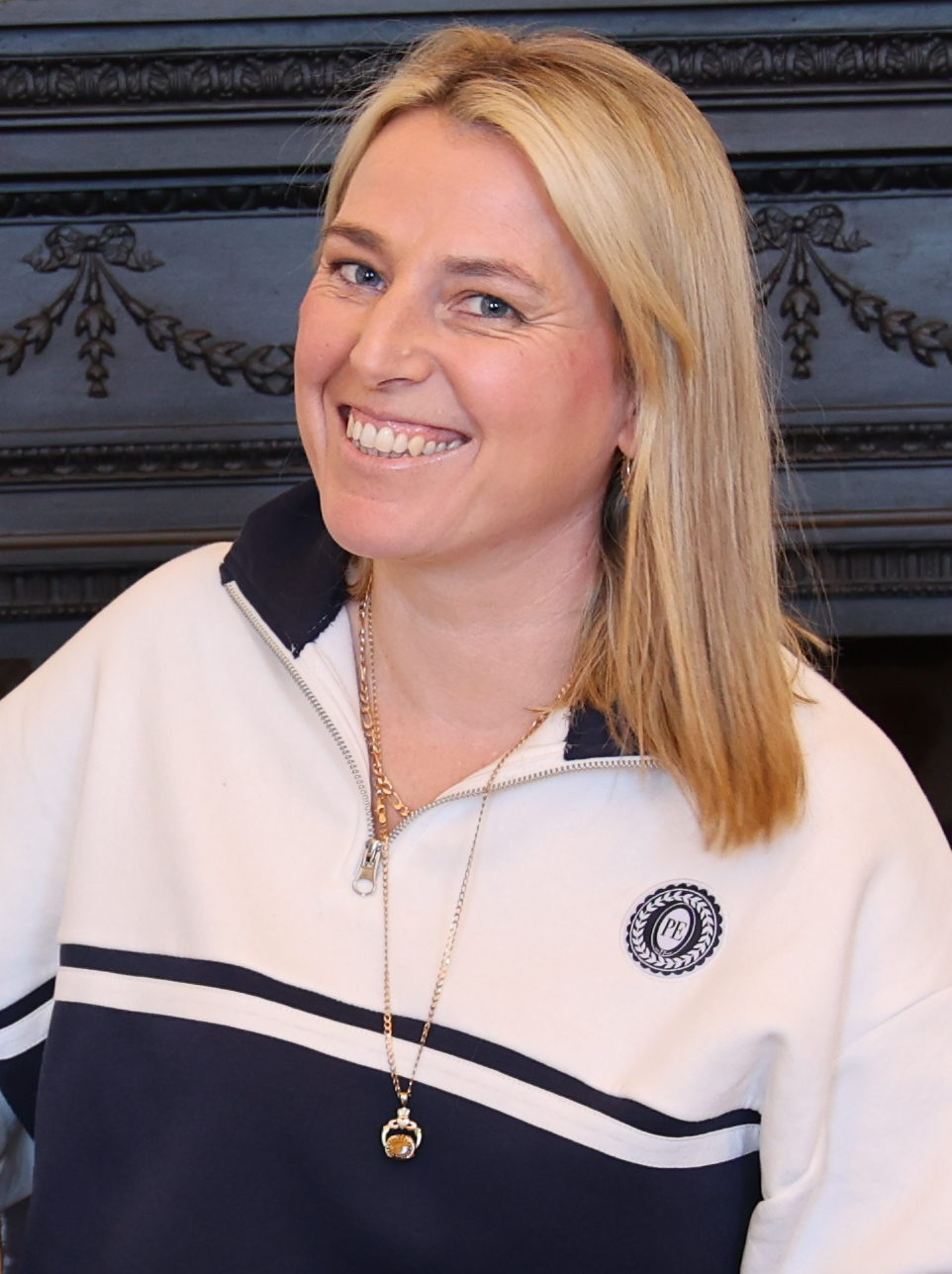
- Ruane in 2025

Senator
- Incumbent
- Assumed office 8 June 2016
- Constituency: Dublin University

Personal details
- Born: 20 October 1984 (age 41) Tallaght, Dublin, Ireland
- Party: Independent
- Other political affiliations: Civil Engagement group
- Children: 2, including Jordanne Jones
- Education: Trinity College Dublin
- Website: lynnruane.ie
- Lynn Ruane's voice (2:10) Ruane recites the poem "Coole Park, 1929" by W. B. Yeats in 2023

Lynn Ruane (born 20 October 1984) is an Irish politician who has served as an independent senator for the Dublin University constituency in Seanad Éireann since April 2016. She was the President of the Trinity College Dublin Students' Union from 2015 to 2016.

== Early life ==
Born in Ballymun, Ruane grew up in a council estate in Killinarden, west Tallaght. While she grew up in a happy and stable home environment, Ruane's childhood was marked by trauma, with her community affected disproportionately by poverty, deprivation, drug addiction and premature death. At age 13, she witnessed a close friend being struck by a bus and killed, the first of a number of young deaths she confronted in her local area.

Ruane became pregnant at the age of 15, at which point she left school, although her guidance counsellor later convinced her to return to complete her Junior Certificate. Ruane gave birth to her first daughter, Jordanne Jones, aged 15. Ruane describes motherhood as having had a profound impact on her life, helping her to "ease the pain and give [her] a purpose".

After returning to education at An Cosán, an educational centre for women started by Katherine Zappone and Ann Louise Gilligan, Ruane studied addiction at IT Tallaght, later going on to develop local services for drug users in Dublin.

== University politics ==
In 2012, she completed a foundation programme to allow access to a degree programme at Trinity College Dublin (TCD), and studied politics and philosophy. Having spent a year representing student parents on the Trinity College Dublin Students' Union executive, she was elected as the union's president on 12 February 2015, which gained national attention. As president, she was active in the fossil fuel divestment campaign at TCD, and the campaign to repeal the Eighth Amendment.

== National political career ==
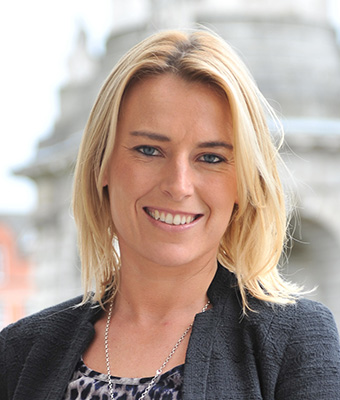
Ruane in 2016

In December 2015, Ruane announced her intention to contest the 2016 Seanad election in the Dublin University constituency as an independent candidate. She was elected to represent Trinity graduates in the Oireachtas on the 15th and final count, unseating incumbent Sean Barrett. She was re-elected in the 2020 Seanad election, reaching the quota on the eighth count.

In the 25th Seanad, Ruane sits with the Civil Engagement group; an alliance of independent senators seeking to bring civil society expertise and experience into the Oireachtas.

In May 2017, Ruane introduced the Controlled Drugs and Harm Reduction Bill to the Seanad, which proposed removing criminal sanctions for minor drug possession. The Bill was co-sponsored by then Senator Aodhán Ó Ríordáin.

In February 2019, Ruane introduced the Criminal Justice (Rehabilitative Periods) Bill to the Seanad, which proposed expanding access to spent convictions, broadening the number and range of convictions that can be regarded as spent. The Bill passed final stage in the Seanad in June 2021 with unanimous support, including from the Government.

In June 2021, Ruane introduced the Employment Equality (Amendment) (Non-Disclosure Agreements) Bill 2021 to the Seanad, which proposed restricting the use of non-disclosure agreements in incidents of workplace sexual harassment and discrimination. The Bill was developed in the context of the MeToo movement, during which a significant number of people disclosed their experiences of sexual abuse or sexual harassment, including Zelda Perkins, a former assistant to film producer Harvey Weinstein. The Bill garnered significant attention internationally, inspiring the development of similar legislation in a number of other jurisdictions. In October 2024, legislative amendments informed by Ruane's Bill were inserted by Minister Roderic O'Gorman TD to the Maternity Protection, Employment Equality and Preservation of Certain Records Bill 2024, which was subsequently signed into law by President Michael D. Higgins.

In November 2021, Ruane introduced the Companies (Emission Reporting) Bill 2021 to the Seanad, which proposed to require companies to make disclosures regarding the greenhouse gas emissions caused by their activities annually, and to cause decreases in these emissions over time. The Bill successfully passed second stage consideration with cross-party support, despite the Government indicating its intention to impose a delay on the Bill.

In May 2024, Ruane co-sponsored the Air Navigation and Transport (Arms Embargo) Bill 2024, which proposed restrictions on the transit and export of weapons of war from and through Ireland to Israel, and to cause inspections of planes seeking to transit weapons through the Irish territory and airspace. Minister Eamon Ryan TD successfully sought to delay the future passage of the Bill for six months, stalling its progress.

In October 2024, Ruane introduced the Parole (Special Advocates) Bill 2024 to the Seanad, which proposed the appointment of special advocates to represent the interests of parole applicants where certain information is withheld by the Parole Board in its consideration of the application.

She was re-elected at the 2025 Seanad election.

Ruane has been referred to as "a long-time campaigner for drug reform in Ireland." She and Green Party TD Neasa Hourigan have called for a citizens' assembly on drugs. Ruane asserts that drug prohibition has never worked and in 2021 signed an open letter with over 100 Irish youth workers and former youth workers calling for an end to drug prohibition and for the legal regulation of drugs in Ireland. The letter has also been signed by Senator Eileen Flynn.

Ruane is a member of the Joint Oireachtas Committees on Children, Equality, Disability, Integration and Youth, and Justice, in addition to being vice-chair of the special Joint Oireachtas Committee on Drugs Use, which was established to consider the 2023 report and recommendations of the Citizens' Assembly on Drugs Use. She was formerly vice-chair of the special Joint Oireachtas Committee on the Eighth Amendment, which was established to examine the repeal of Ireland's constitutional ban on abortion and recommend the legal grounds to access an abortion in Ireland.

Miriam Lord of The Irish Times named Ruane her 2016 Senator of the Year.

== Work outside of politics ==
In 2016, Ruane played a juror on the TV3 historical courtroom drama Trial of the Century.

In September 2018, Ruane published a memoir entitled People Like Me. The memoir reached number one on the Irish paperback non-fiction charts and won the 2018 An Post Irish Book Award for best non-fiction.

In 2021, Ruane contributed to a published collection of memoirs and essays called The 32: An Anthology of Irish Working-Class Voices.

In 2022, Ruane launched the podcast series Conversations on the Margins, which she created and presented. The series examines the lives of people incarcerated in Irish prisons in a meaningful way, and includes conversations with prisoners, prison staff and management, and advocates for penal reform. The series won the 2022 Irish Podcast Award for best interview.

In February 2023, Ruane presented a two-part documentary on RTÉ with Miriam Margolyes entitled Lady Gregory: Ireland's First Social Influencer. The series, filmed in the summer of 2022, traces the influence of Lady Augusta Gregory on Irish theatre, writing and the arts. The series was well received by Irish media, with pundits being endeared by the dynamic and banter shared between the duo. Ruane and Margolyes appeared together on the Late Late Show to promote the programme in January 2023.

In July 2023, Waiting Day, a short film written by Ruane, was premiered at the Galway Film Fleadh. The film, directed by Grace Dyas, depicts a day in the life of a young family affected by poverty and addiction. The film was created with the support of Alfonso Films and Screen Ireland, and stars Ruane's eldest daughter, Jordanne Jones. In 2024, the film featured in the programme of the Dublin International Film Festival.

In April 2024, Ruane featured in an episode of the Max travel show Conan O'Brien Must Go, which saw its host, Conan O'Brien, return to his ancestral homeland. In the episode, Ruane taught O'Brien idiomatic Irish and Dublin slang.

Ruane's first feature length film, a coming-of-age story entitled Ready or Not, was due for release in 2024. The film follows a group of friends navigating the challenges of teenagehood in the 1990s against the backdrop of working class Dublin. Casting for the film was undertaken in working class communities in Dublin, with filming wrapping in July 2023. The film is the directorial debut of award-winning filmmaker Claire Frances Byrne, and was produced by Ruth Coady for Gaze Pictures and supported by Screen Ireland, Bankside Films, RTÉ and Article 1.

== Personal life ==
Ruane has two daughters. Her eldest daughter, Jordanne Jones, born when Ruane was 15, is a DFCC award-winning and IFTA nominated actress. She has another daughter from a subsequent relationship.

Ruane lives with endometriosis, and has advocated for more expedient diagnosis and better care for people affected by the disease in Ireland. In 2023, Ruane was diagnosed with attention deficit hyperactivity disorder.

== Bibliography ==
- People Like Me (Gill Books, ISBN 9780717180189, published September 2018)
- The 32: An Anthology of Irish Working-Class Voices (Unbound, ISBN 9781800180246, published July 2021)
