= 2019 European Parliament election in Ireland =

- 24 May 2019

13 Irish seats to the European Parliament (2 of which were post-Brexit seats)
- Opinion polls
- Turnout: 1,751,873 (49.7% ▼2.7 pp)
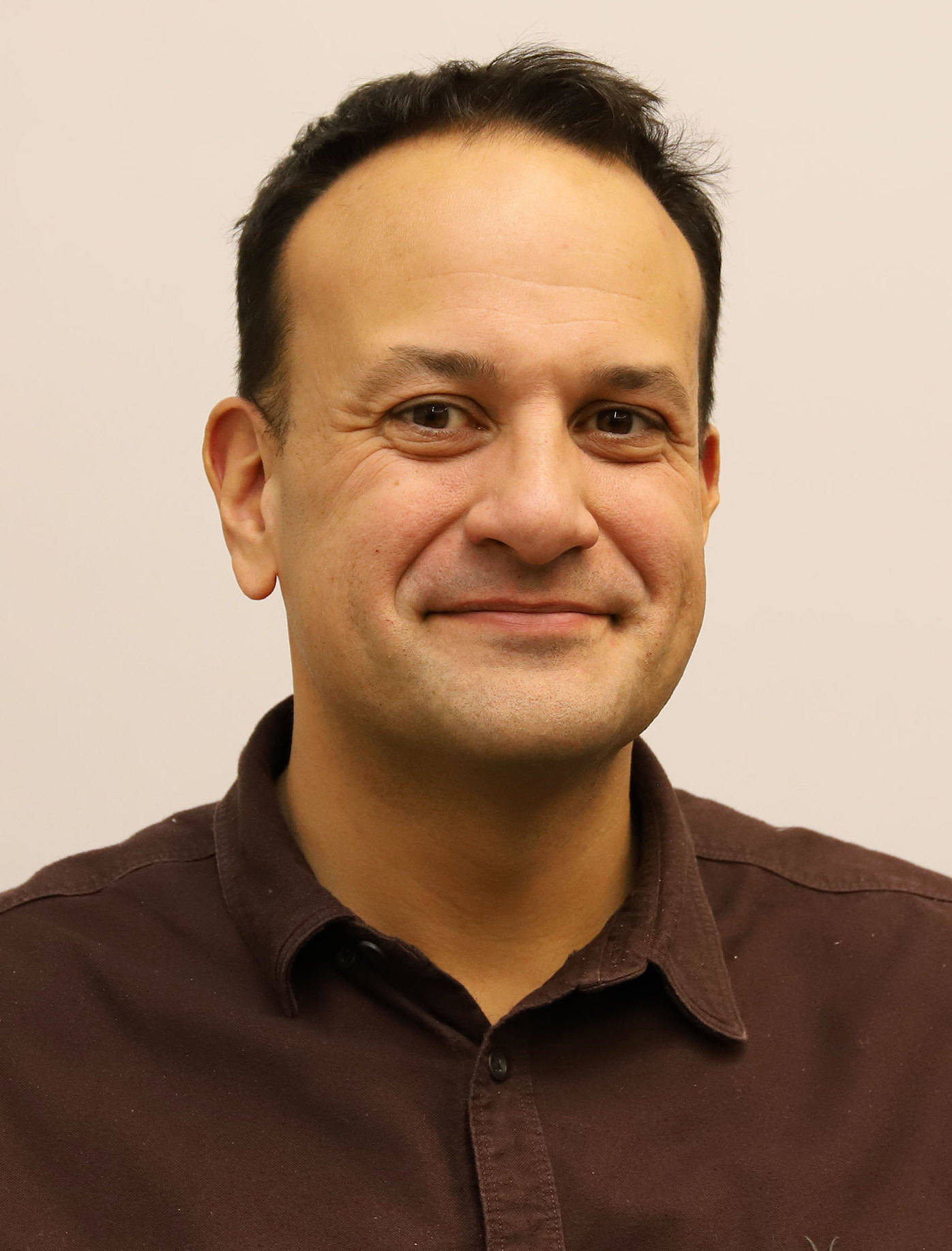

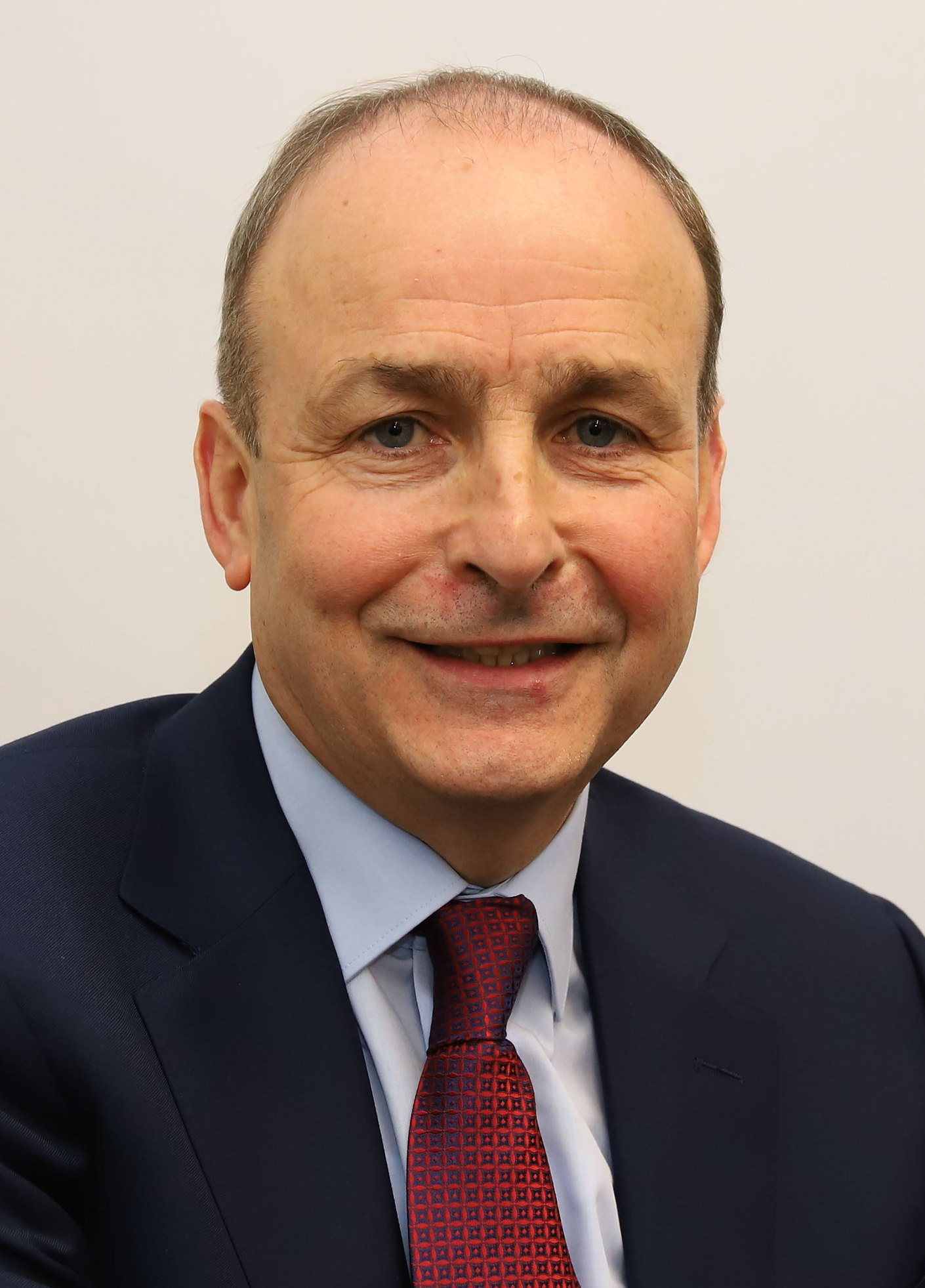

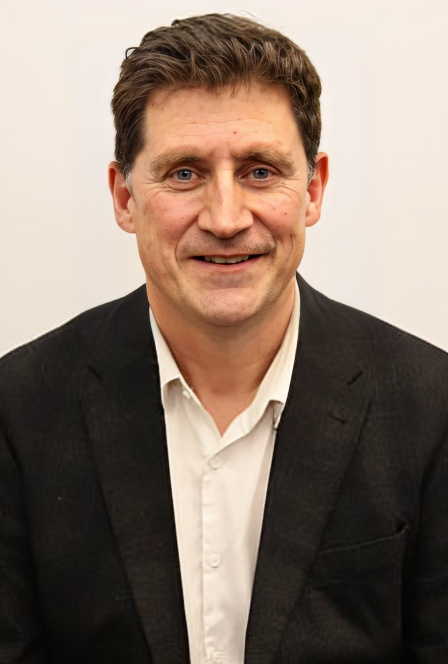

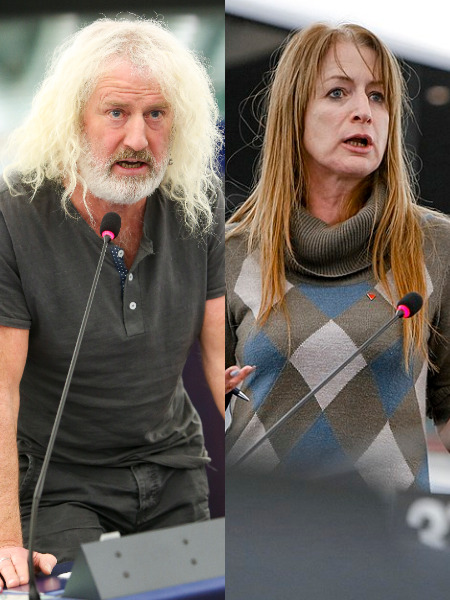

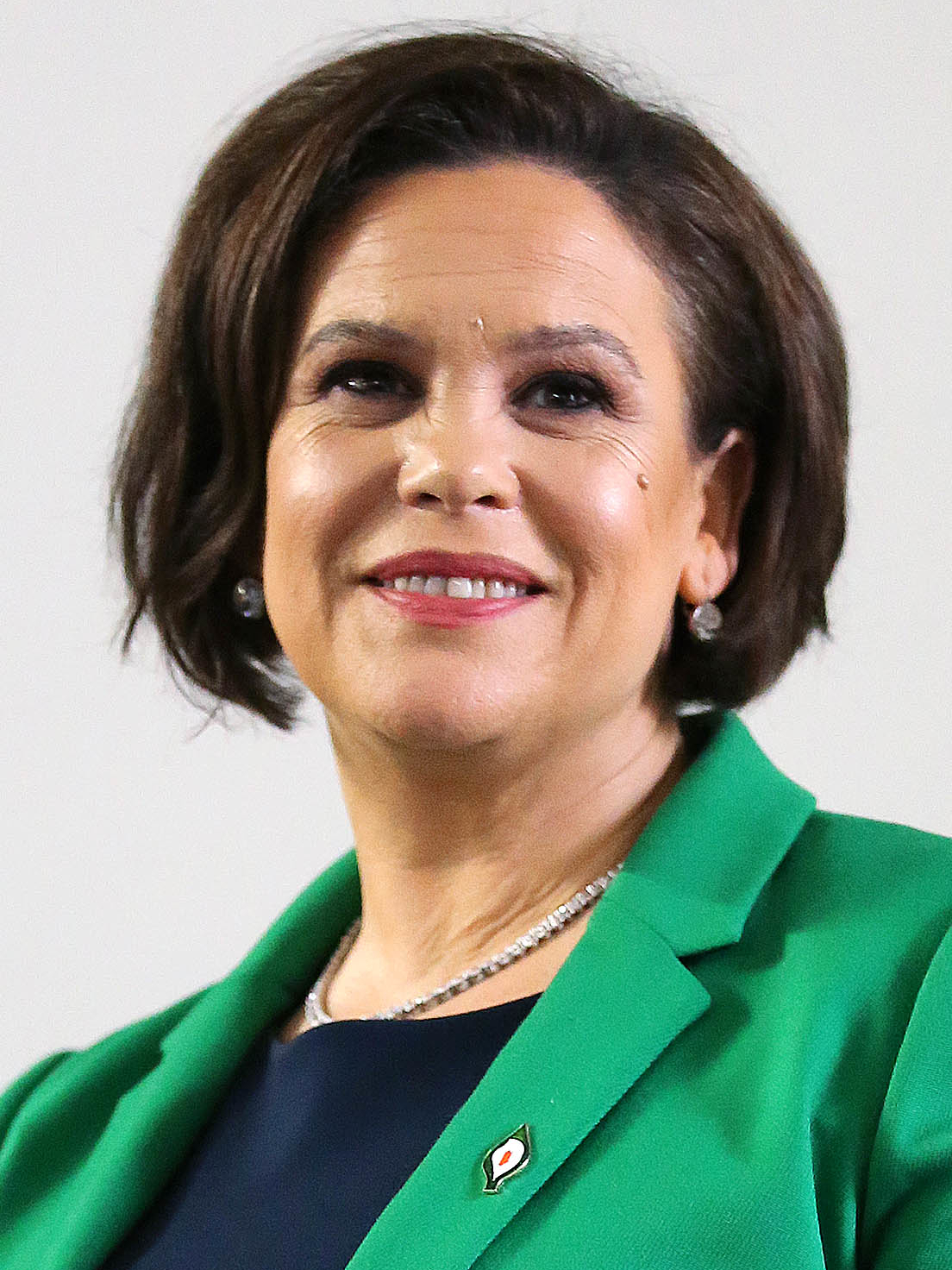

	First party	Second party	Third party
Leader	Leo Varadkar	Micheál Martin	Eamon Ryan
Party	Fine Gael	Fianna Fáil	Green
Alliance	EPP	Renew	Greens/EFA
Last election	22.3%, 4 seats	22.3%, 1 seat	4.9%, 0 seats
Seats won	5 / 13 (Note: When the United Kingdom left the European Union and the seats in the European Parliament were redistributed, Fine Gael/EPP Group gained an additional seat in the South constituency.)	2 / 13 (Note: When the United Kingdom left the European Union and the seats in the European Parliament were redistributed, Fianna Fáil/Renew Europe gained an additional seat in the Dublin constituency.)	2 / 13
Seat change	▲1	▲2	▲2
Popular vote	496,459	277,705	190,755
Percentage	29.6%	16.6%	11.4%
Swing	▲7.3 pp	▼5.7 pp	▲6.5 pp
	Fourth party	Fifth party	Sixth party
Leader	Collective leadership (Note: Pictured here is the party's two successful candidates in this election, Mick Wallace and Clare Daly)	Mary Lou McDonald	Brendan Howlin
Party	Inds. 4 Change	Sinn Féin	Labour
Alliance	GUE/NGL	GUE/NGL	S&D
Last election	New Party	19.5%, 3 seats	5.3%, 0 seats
Seats won	2 / 13	1 / 13	0 / 13
Seat change	▲2	▼2	Steady
Popular vote	124,085	196,001	52,753
Percentage	7.4%	11.7%	3.1%
Swing	N/A	▼7.8 pp	▼2.2 pp

2019 European Parliament Ireland constituencies

The 2019 European Parliament election in Ireland was the Irish component of the 2019 European Parliament election and was held on Friday, 24 May 2019, on the same day as the 2019 local elections and a referendum easing restrictions on divorce. The election was conducted in three constituencies under the single transferable vote (STV). Thirteen MEPs were elected, but the last candidate elected in both Dublin and South did not take their seats until after Brexit on 31 January 2020.

== Constituency changes ==
The United Kingdom invoked Article 50 to withdraw from the European Union on 29 March 2017 following the 2016 referendum to leave the European Union. As Article 50 has a two-year period for withdrawal, the United Kingdom would not be part of the 2019 European Parliament election scheduled for May 2019. In July 2018, the European Council made a decision to redistribute a number of the seats from the United Kingdom to other member states. The allocation of MEPs from Ireland increased from 11 to 13; however, this change would not take effect until the United Kingdom has left the EU, which took place on 31 January 2020. As the United Kingdom was still a member of the EU at the beginning of the 2019–2024 parliamentary term, the allocation of seats will remain as it was in the previous parliament, until its withdrawal becomes legally effective.

A Constituency Commission chaired by High Court judge Robert Haughton was established by the Minister for Housing, Planning and Local Government in July 2018 to redraw constituencies in line with the change in seats. The commission's report was published on 24 September 2018 and proposed the following changes:

- Dublin gains an extra seat from 3 to 4; with no boundary changes. Full electorate is 884,118, giving electorate of 221,029.5 per seat.
- South gains an extra seat from 4 to 5, and gains counties Laois and Offaly from Midlands–North-West. Full electorate is 1,417,017, giving electorate of 283,403.4 per seat.
- Midlands–North-West loses Laois and Offaly to South, but remains a 4 seater. Full electorate is 1,224,888, giving electorate of 306,222 per seat.

The European Parliament Elections (Amendment) Act 2019 enacted the changes recommended by the Constituency Commission.

It also provided for the situation that Ireland's representation remained at 11 with an amendment to the rules, "For the purpose of the European elections held in the year 2019, the return made by the chief returning officer [...] shall declare that the last candidate deemed to be elected [...] in each of the constituencies of Dublin and South as specified in the Third Schedule, shall not take up their seats in the European Parliament until such time as a date has been specified by the Parliament for the taking up of such seats".

Taoiseach Leo Varadkar had incorrectly suggested that the votes would be counted twice in the constituencies which had an increased number of seats, to account for either contingency. However, Minister for Housing, Planning and Local Government Eoghan Murphy later clarified that there would be only one count for each constituency, and that the final candidate to be deemed elected in Dublin and South would not take their seats until the withdrawal of the United Kingdom.

== Retiring incumbents ==
The following MEPs did not seek re-election:

Constituency	Departing MEP	Party	EP Group	First elected	Date announced
Dublin	Nessa Childers	Independent	S&D	2009	18 July 2017
South	Brian Crowley	Independent	ECR	1994	17 January 2019
Dublin	Brian Hayes	Fine Gael	EPP	2014	6 November 2018
Midlands–North-West	Marian Harkin	Independent	ALDE	2004	1 April 2019

== Candidates ==
Nominations closed at midday on 15 April 2019, with 59 candidates in total: 19 in Dublin (4 seats), 17 in Midlands–North-West (4 seats) and 23 in South (5 seats).

== Opinion polls ==
=== Party opinion polling ===
==== Nationwide ====
Last date of polling	Polling firm / Commissioner	Constituency	Sample size	FG	FF	SF	Lab	GP	S–PBP	SD	RI	IA	O/I (Note: This column includes figures for Independents 4 Change and Aontú when available.)
17 April 2019	Red C/The Sunday Business Post	Dublin, Midlands–North-West, South	1,000	33	21	16	4	4	0	1	0	2	21 (Note: A figure for 'Others/Independents' is not mentioned in the cited source, but has been calculated by subtracting the other parties from 100%, so the figure shown may be slightly inaccurate due to rounding effects.)

==== Dublin ====
Last date of polling	Polling firm / Commissioner	Sample size	FG	SF	FF	GP	I4C	S–PBP	Lab	SD	O/I
16 May 2019	Red C/The Sunday Business Post	553	25	13	12	11	9	7	5	4	15
10 May 2019	Ipsos MRBI/The Irish Times	500	29	13	18	9	10	6	8	1	6

==== Midlands-North-West ====
Last date of polling	Polling firm / Commissioner	Sample size	FG	FF	SF	GP	Lab	O/I
16 May 2019	Red C/The Sunday Business Post	646	37	15	14	4	3	27
10 May 2019	Ipsos MRBI/The Irish Times	500	37	13	14	3	2	31

==== South ====
Last date of polling	Polling firm / Commissioner	Sample size	FG	FF	SF	I4C	GP	Lab	S–PBP	O/I
16 May 2019	Red C/The Sunday Business Post	825	30	23	15	8	8	3	3	10
10 May 2019	Ipsos MRBI/The Irish Times	500	37	23	14	8	5	5	1	6

=== Candidate polling ===
==== Dublin ====
Last date of polling	Polling firm / Commissioner	Sample size	Fitzgerald (FG)	Boylan (SF)	Andrews (FF)	Cuffe (GP)	Daly (I4C)	Durkan (FG)	White (Lab)	Harrold (S–PBP)	Gannon (SD)	Brien (S–PBP)	Higgins (Ind)	O/I
16 May 2019	Red C/The Sunday Business Post	553	17	13	12	11	9	8	5	4	4	3	2	13
10 May 2019	Ipsos MRBI/The Irish Times	500	22	13	18	9	10	7	8	3	1	3	2	4

==== Midlands-North-West ====
Last date of polling	Polling firm / Commissioner	Sample size	McGuinness (FG)	Carthy (SF)	Flanagan (Ind)	Walsh (FG)	Casey (Ind)	Smith (FF)	Rabbitte (FF)	McHugh (GP)	Hannigan (Lab)	O'Dowd (RI)	O/I
16 May 2019	Red C/The Sunday Business Post	646	27	14	12	10	10	9	6	4	3	2	3
10 May 2019	Ipsos MRBI/The Irish Times	500	26	14	16	11	9	8	5	3	2	1	4

==== South ====
Last date of polling	Polling firm / Commissioner	Sample size	Kelly (FG)	Ní Riada (SF)	Kelleher (FF)	Byrne (FF)	Wallace (I4C)	O'Sullivan (GP)	Clune (FG)	Doyle (FG)	Nunan (Lab)	Wallace (S–PBP)	O/I
16 May 2019	Red C/The Sunday Business Post	825	17	15	13	10	8	8	7	6	3	3	10
10 May 2019	Ipsos MRBI/The Irish Times	500	18	14	13	10	8	5	10	9	5	1	7

== Results ==
Party	Votes	%	+/–	Seats			
Party	Votes	%	+/–	Before Brexit	+/–	After Brexit	+/–
Fine Gael	496,459	29.59	+7.3	5	+1	6	+1
Fianna Fáil	277,705	16.55	–5.7	2	+1	3	+1
Sinn Féin	196,001	11.68	–7.8	1	–1	1	0
Green Party	190,755	11.37	+6.5	2	+2	2	0
Independents 4 Change	124,085	7.39	New	2	New	2	0
Labour Party	52,753	3.14	–2.2	0	0	0	0
Solidarity–People Before Profit	38,771	2.31	–1.0	0	0	0	0
Social Democrats	20,331	1.21	New	0	New	0	0
Renua	6,897	0.41	New	0	New	0	0
Workers' Party	3,701	0.22	New	0	New	0	0
Identity Ireland	3,685	0.22	New	0	New	0	0
Direct Democracy Ireland	2,773	0.17	–1.3	0	0	0	0
Independent	264,087	15.74	–4.1	1	–1	1	0
Total	1,678,003	100.00	–	13	+2	15	+2
Valid votes	1,678,003	95.78					
Invalid/blank votes	73,870	4.22					
Total votes	1,751,873	100.00					
Registered voters/turnout	3,526,023	49.68					
Source: RTÉ News

=== MEPs elected ===
Constituency	Name	Party	EP group
Midlands–North-West	Mairead McGuinness	Fine Gael	EPP
Midlands–North-West	Luke 'Ming' Flanagan	Independent	GUE/NGL
Midlands–North-West	Matt Carthy	Sinn Féin	GUE/NGL
Midlands–North-West	Maria Walsh	Fine Gael	EPP
Dublin	Ciarán Cuffe	Green	Greens/EFA
Dublin	Frances Fitzgerald	Fine Gael	EPP
Dublin	Clare Daly	Inds. 4 Change	GUE/NGL
Dublin	Barry Andrews	Fianna Fáil	RE
South	Seán Kelly	Fine Gael	EPP
South	Billy Kelleher	Fianna Fáil	RE
South	Mick Wallace	Inds. 4 Change	GUE/NGL
South	Grace O'Sullivan	Green	Greens/EFA
South	Deirdre Clune	Fine Gael	EPP

Independents 4 Change was not affiliated to a parliamentary group at the time of the election, but joined European United Left–Nordic Green Left group.

== See also ==
- 2020 Irish general election
