= Alice-Mary Higgins =

Irish politician (born 1975)

Senator Alice-Mary Higgins
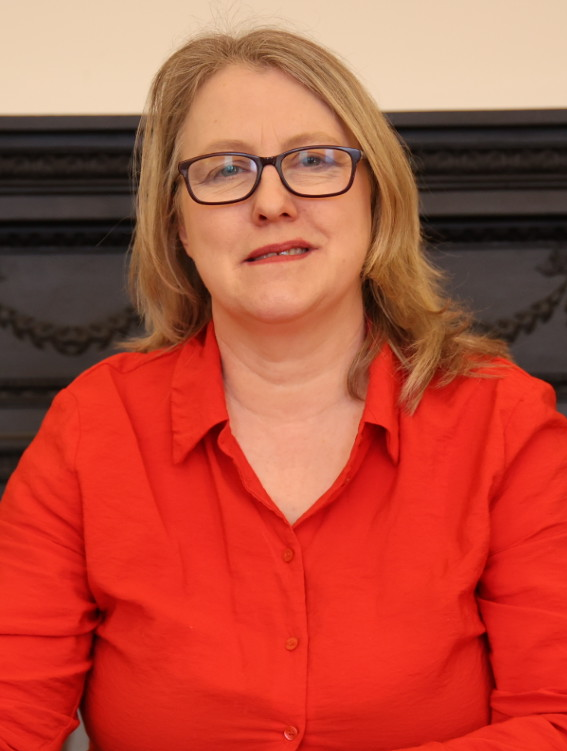
- Higgins in 2025

Senator
- Incumbent
- Assumed office 8 June 2016
- Constituency: National University

Personal details
- Born: 10 April 1975 (age 51) Galway, Ireland
- Party: Independent
- Other political affiliations: Civil Engagement group
- Children: 1
- Parents: Michael D. Higgins; Sabina Higgins
- Education: University College Dublin; Trinity College Dublin; The New School
- Website: alicemaryhiggins.ie

Alice-Mary Higgins (born 10 April 1975) is an Irish independent politician who has served as a senator for the National University since April 2016. She became the leader of the Civil Engagement group in the 25th Seanad. She was the campaigns and policy officer at the National Women's Council of Ireland, and a board member of the European Women's Lobby.

== Early life and education ==
Higgins is the daughter of Michael D. Higgins, a former Labour Party politician and the ninth president of Ireland, and Sabina Higgins.

Higgins studied English and philosophy at University College Dublin, and took an MPhil in theatre and cultural studies at Trinity College Dublin, and a Fulbright MA in sociology at The New School in New York City.

== Career ==
Higgins stood for election to Seanad Éireann on the National University panel in April 2016 and was elected to the third and final seat on the 28th count.

She was an independent candidate for the Dublin constituency at the 2019 European Parliament election but was not elected.

Higgins currently serves as a member of the executive committee of the European Parliamentary Forum for Sexual and Reproductive Rights, campaigning for gender equality, reproductive rights and equal access to healthcare for women.

In 2016, Higgins introduced a motion to the Seanad calling on the Irish Government not to sign up to provisional application of the Comprehensive and Economic Trade Agreement (CETA), citing the investor court system elements of the treaty's potential impacts on public services, the environment and policy decisions.

Higgins currently serves on the Joint Oireachtas Committee on Climate Action, the Joint Oireachtas Committee on Finance, Public Expenditure and Reform, and Taoiseach and the Joint Oireachtas Committee on Disability Matters.

In December 2020, journalist Miriam Lord named Higgins 'Senator of the Year' "for her tireless approach, collegial outlook, level of research, grasp of detail, participation in debates and undimmed enthusiasm for the job."

In the 25th Seanad Higgins served on the Joint Oireachtas Committee on Climate Action and the Join Oireachtas Committee on Employment Affairs and Social Protection.

In 2021, Higgins introduced a motion to support the TRIPS Waiver on the COVID-19 vaccine, which was passed in the Seanad.

Higgins tabled over 100 amendments to the Climate Action and Low Carbon Development (Amendment) Bill 2021 to strengthen emissions targets and place stronger requirements for climate justice and just transition in the Bill. Journalist Miriam Lord said Higgins’ work on the Bill “won universal praise” and that she “saw the global picture, knew her subject inside out, was detailed and logical and spent hours in the chamber.”

In 2023, Higgins introduced the Climate Action and Biodiversity (Mandates of Certain Organisations) Bill, which would give Coillte and Bord na Mona - two of the largest landowners in Ireland - mandates for nature and climate action. The legislation would also require the bodies to enact just transition policies.

She was re-elected at the 2025 Seanad election.

== Personal life ==
In June 2023, she gave birth to her first child, a boy.
