= Grace O'Sullivan =

Irish politician (born 1962)

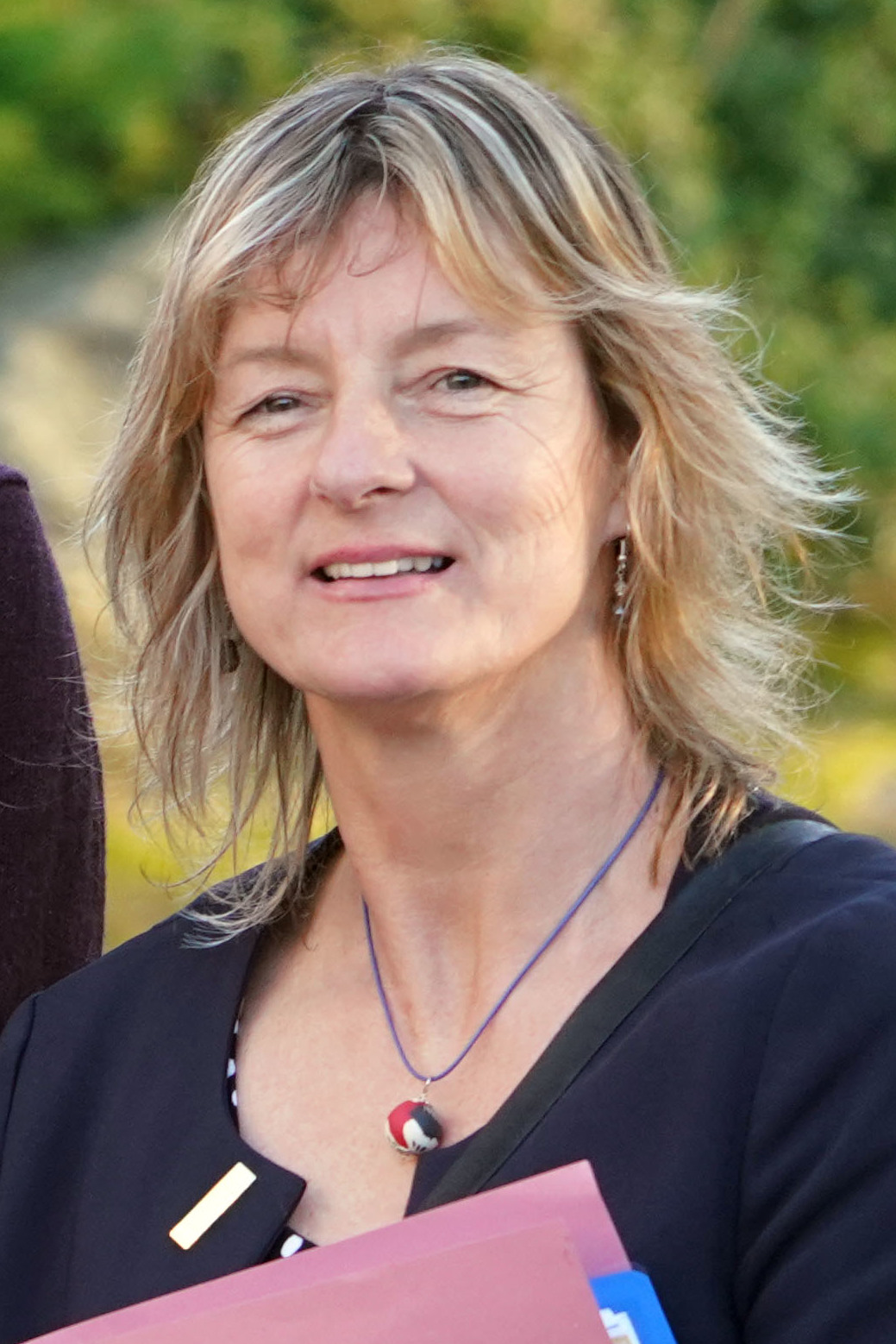
- O'Sullivan in 2019

Member of the European Parliament
- In office 2 July 2019 – 17 July 2024
- Constituency: South

Senator
- In office 8 June 2016 – 1 July 2019
- Constituency: Agricultural Panel

Personal details
- Born: 8 March 1962 (age 64) Tramore, County Waterford, Ireland
- Party: Ireland: Green Party; EU: European Green Party
- Children: 3
- Education: Open University; Waterford Institute of Technology; University College Cork
- Website: graceosullivan.ie

Grace O'Sullivan (born 8 March 1962) is an Irish politician who served as a Member of the European Parliament (MEP) from Ireland for the South constituency from 2019 until 2024. She is a member of the Green Party, and part of the European Green Party. She previously served as a Senator for the Agricultural Panel from 2016 to 2019.

O'Sullivan is also known for her activism during a 20-year career with Greenpeace having served on the crew of the Rainbow Warrior when it was bombed in New Zealand in 1985 by French Intelligence. She is a former Irish surfing champion and has worked for a number of years as an environmental education specialist and ecologist.

Initially elected in the 2019 European Parliament elections, O'Sullivan lost her seat in the 2024 European elections.

== Early and personal life ==
O'Sullivan was born in County Waterford in Ireland, where she grew up in Tramore, close to the back strand and the surrounding countryside, an environment which she says was influential on her life and appreciation of nature and the sea.

As a result of growing up near the sea, O'Sullivan was involved in water and nature-based activities from a young age. She joined Tramore Sea and Cliff Rescue at the age of 16, and by the age of 18 was a helmsman with the Tramore RNLI. She spent some time as a lifeguard with Waterford County Council, patrolling Tramore beach during the summer months.

She was a keen sportsperson at school, learning to surf where she grew up. In the late 1970s, O'Sullivan began to surf competitively and became Ireland's first national female surf champion in 1981.

O'Sullivan is a mother of three, an environmental activist and educationalist and a Green Party politician. Her sister Lola O'Sullivan is a Fine Gael Waterford City and County Councillor.

== Greenpeace ==
O'Sullivan's interest in activism, the environment and the sea led to her taking up a position with Greenpeace in 1983, when she was 21 years old. She spent the next 20 years working with the organisation in areas that included almost 10 years on various Greenpeace ships. She was a crew member of the original Rainbow Warrior when it was bombed in New Zealand in 1985 by French Intelligence. O'Sullivan had been sailing from Florida to Hawaii on the Rainbow Warrior, and went to several small island nations in the Pacific Ocean, taking part in actions for peace and climate justice. On the night of the bombing, two French agents detonated limpet mines and sank the ship as it sat in Auckland Harbour. One crew member died from the bombing, Fernando Pereira, a photographer and friend of O'Sullivan's.

In 1986 O'Sullivan famously attempted to board a Soviet warship in the Mediterranean, by climbing up the anchor chain barefoot in an attempt to protest against the nuclear warheads on board. The purpose of the action was to highlight how close Russian and American vessels carrying nuclear weapons were to populations around the Mediterranean.

O'Sullivan has travelled twice to Antarctica as part of Greenpeace's mission to get a seat in the Antarctic Treaty Nations, in order to convince global leaders of having Antarctica protected as a world park, as well as blocking the construction of a French military airstrip on the continent.

She spent a number of years working for Greenpeace at its Amsterdam offices, including time as assistant to Campaign Director and as Human Resources Manager for Greenpeace International. In addition to working full-time at Greenpeace, O'Sullivan also completed a post graduate diploma in Business Enterprise Development at Waterford Institute of Technology and a diploma in Field Ecology at University College Cork.

== Political career ==
O'Sullivan ran as the Green MEP candidate for the Ireland South constituency in the 2014 European election, being eliminated on the 7th count with approximately 4% of first preference votes. She was elected as a Senator in 2016, and sat with 5 other senators in the Civil Engagement group.

O’Sullivan is a member of the Green Party in Ireland, and was a member of the Agricultural Panel when she served as a Senator. She was also the Green Party Spokesperson on Tourism and the Marine. She was a sponsor of the Control of Economic Activity (Occupied Territories) Bill 2018, tabled by Senator Frances Black, which sought to prohibit the import of goods produced on illegal settlements in the Occupied Palestinian Territories.

=== European Parliament ===
O'Sullivan was elected at the 2019 European Parliament election for the South constituency in Ireland. She received 75,946 (10.56%) first-preference votes. She was elected on the 18th count after a recount of the votes between her and outgoing MEP Liadh Ni Riada. This resulted in O'Sullivan securing the fourth MEP seat in the Ireland South constituency. Pippa Hackett was elected unopposed to the Agricultural Panel of Seanad Éireann in the by-election on 1 November 2019 caused by O'Sullivan's election to the European Parliament.

Within the European Parliament, O'Sullivan is a member of the Greens/European Free Alliance (Greens/EFA), a political group of the European Parliament composed primarily of green and regionalist political parties. As part of her work in the European Parliament, O'Sullivan is a member of several committees, including the Maritime Affairs and Fisheries (PECH) Committee, and the Environment, Public Health and Food Safety (ENVI) Committee. O'Sullivan is also a member of delegations on Mercosur and Palestine, and a member of a number of intergroups and working groups, including the LGBTI Intergroup, the Disability Intergroup and the Animal Welfare Intergroup.

In 2021, Grace O'Sullivan drafted and tabled a European Parliament Resolution calling for the establishment of two Marine Protected Areas in the Antarctic Southern Ocean. The Resolution came as the Commission on the Conservation of Antarctic Marine Living Resources (CCAMLR) was attempting to reach agreement on what would be the largest marine protected area in existence. The achievement of this continues to be blocked by the Russian Federation in the context of its invasion of Ukraine and a growing Russian polar fishery industry.

In 2022, O'Sullivan drafted and tabled a second Resolution, on the topic of ocean governance. The Resolution continued the call for Antarctic Marine Protected Areas, as well as calling for a ban on bottom-trawling in marine protected areas and the cessation of all mining and oil extraction in the Arctic Sea.

O'Sullivan was the co-coordinator of a biodiversity working group. This is an internal campaign group within the Greens/EFA political group of the European Parliament. This working group meets to discuss issues related to biodiversity that are within the scope of various committees, including the committees responsible for environment (ENVI), fisheries (PECH) and agriculture (AGRI).

At the 2024 European Parliament elections O'Sullivan received 47,661 (6.9%) first preference votes, and lost her seat.

=== 8th Environment Action Programme ===
Throughout 2021 Grace was the Rapporteur (Parliament's lead negotiator) on the 8th Environment Action Programme environmental legislation. As of October 2021, O'Sullivan was representing the European Parliament in trilogue negotiations with the European Commission and Council. The 8th EAP is due to last until 2030.
