= Eileen Flynn (politician) =

Irish activist and politician (born 1989/1990)

Senator Eileen Flynn
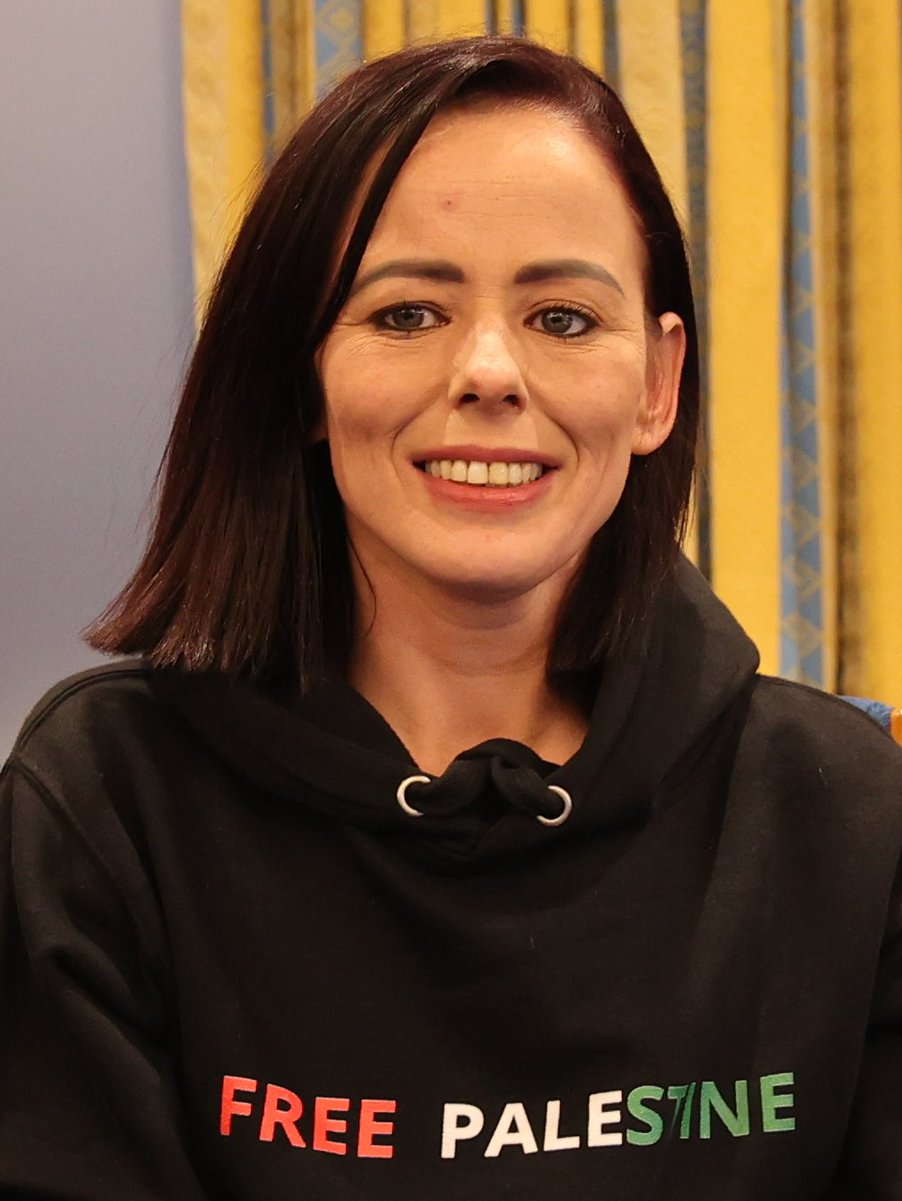
- Flynn in 2025

Senator
- Incumbent
- Assumed office 30 January 2025
- Constituency: Administrative Panel
- In office 29 June 2020 – 30 January 2025
- Constituency: Nominated by the Taoiseach

Personal details
- Born: 1989/1990 (age 36–37) Ballyfermot, Dublin, Ireland
- Party: Independent
- Other political affiliations: Civil Engagement group
- Spouse: Liam Whyte
- Children: 2
- Education: Trinity College Dublin; Ballyfermot College of Further Education; Maynooth University

Eileen Flynn (born 1989/1990) is an Irish independent politician who has served as a senator since June 2020. She was elected for the Administrative Panel in 2025, having previously being nominated by the Taoiseach in 2020.

Her background is in community development and activism on behalf of Irish Travellers. In June 2020, Taoiseach Micheál Martin appointed Flynn to Seanad Éireann, the Irish Senate. She is the first female Traveller to serve in the Oireachtas.

== Early life ==
Eileen and her twin sister Sally were born into a family of nine children in Labre Park, a halting site located in Ballyfermot in Dublin. Flynn's mother died of pneumonia at the age of 48, when Eileen and Sally were 10 years old. Flynn subsequently struggled in school and rebelled against authority. However, Flynn credits her teachers for not giving up on her, and despite her problems both she and her twin became the first members of the Labre Park community to reach third level education in 2008. Her primary and secondary school education came at Linn Dara in Cherry Orchard Ballyfermot. Flynn studied at Trinity College Dublin as part of an access course before attending Ballyfermot College of Further Education and later earning a degree at Maynooth University, a BA in community development.

== Activism ==
Following the completion of her education, Flynn had been an activist and community worker for a decade, working with groups such as the Irish Traveller Movement, the National Traveller Women's Forum and the Ballyfermot Traveller Action Programme. She also campaigned on issues such as housing, marriage equality, abortion rights and anti-racism.

== Political career ==
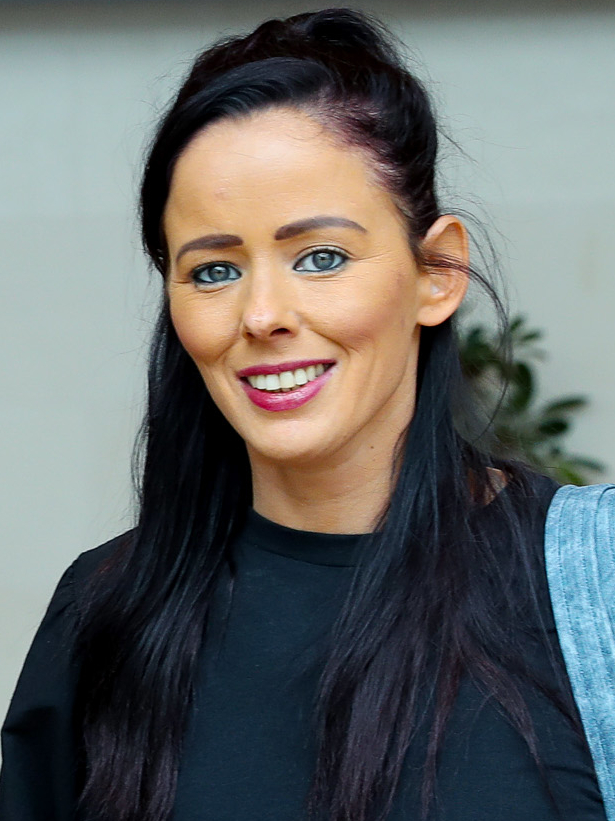
Flynn in 2020

Flynn stood as a candidate for the Labour Panel in the 2020 Seanad election but missed out by a very narrow margin. On 28 June 2020, she became a senator after being nominated by the Taoiseach, and in doing so became the first-ever Traveller to be a member of the Oireachtas. (Note: Sinn Féin's Pádraig Mac Lochlainn is from a Traveller background, and was elected to the Oireachtas in 2011. However, he does not consider himself to be a Traveller.) Pavee Point, the Traveller Advocacy organisation, hailed her appointment to the Seanad as "historic", as did the National Women's Council of Ireland. David Norris, the longest-serving member of the Senate, called her nomination a significant advance. Flynn stated her objectives in the Seanad will be "mental health services, unemployment among Travellers, opportunities for minority groups and getting hate-crime legislation enacted".

Within three days of taking her seat in the Senate, a male senator confronted Flynn and called her a "token" nomination. Flynn retorted back that she had earned her position through her activism.

In November 2020, Flynn was elected as chairperson of the Joint Oireachtas Committee on Key Issues affecting the Traveller Community.

In 2022, Flynn tabled a bill in the Seanad to replace the term "child pornography" with "child sexual exploitation material" in legislation, stating that the term "does not truly reflect the nature of the abuse".

At the 2025 Seanad election, she was elected for the Administrative Panel.

In 2026, Flynn commented that she would not attend protests where the Irish tricolour flag was being flown, because it was a symbol that was being exploited by the far-right. Following this she was subject to days of online abuse, mostly posted by accounts that post anti-immigration content and also right-wing influencers.

In 2026, Flynn provided a positive character reference and requested leniency for John O'Brien, an Irish man and Traveller who was found guilty in an American court of defrauding over one hundred customers out of an estimated $2.6 million by carrying out flaunty repair jobs on their houses in the New England region of the United States.

== Awards ==
Flynn was on the list of the BBC's 100 Women announced on 23 November 2020.

== Personal life ==
Since 2018, Flynn has lived in Ardara, County Donegal, with her husband Liam Whyte, a settled man, and their two daughters.
