= John Dolan (politician) =

Irish politician (born 1956)

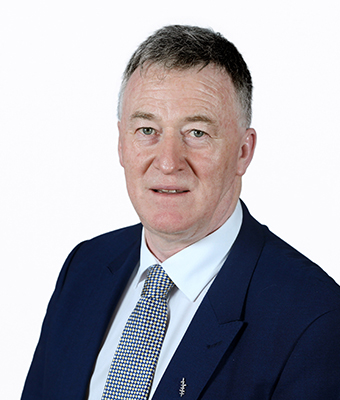

Senator
- In office 8 June 2016 – 29 June 2020
- Constituency: Administrative Panel

Personal details
- Born: 13 January 1956 (age 70) Tipperary, County Tipperary, Ireland
- Party: Independent
- Spouse: Liz Ryan
- Children: 1
- Education: St. Patrick's College, Thurles; University College Dublin; National College of Ireland

John Dolan (born 19 May 1956) is an Irish former independent politician who served as a Senator for the Administrative Panel from 2016 to 2020. He is the CEO of the Disability Federation of Ireland.

He holds a BA in Economics and English from University College Dublin, a qualifications in Philosophy from St. Patrick's College, Thurles and Personal Management from the National College of Industrial Relations.

He lost his seat at the 2020 Seanad election.
