= Same-sex marriage in the Republic of Ireland =

Same-sex marriage has been legal in Ireland since 16 November 2015. A referendum on 22 May 2015 amended the Constitution of Ireland to provide that marriage is recognised irrespective of the sex of the partners. The measure was signed into law by the President of Ireland, Michael D. Higgins, as the Thirty-fourth Amendment of the Constitution of Ireland on 29 August 2015. The Marriage Act 2015, passed by the Oireachtas on 22 October 2015 and signed into law by the Presidential Commission on 29 October, gave legislative effect to the amendment. Same-sex marriages in Ireland began being recognised from 16 November, and the first marriage ceremonies of same-sex couples in Ireland occurred the following day. Ireland was the eleventh country in Europe and the eighteenth in the world to allow same-sex couples to marry nationwide.

Civil partnerships, granted under the Civil Partnership and Certain Rights and Obligations of Cohabitants Act 2010, gave same-sex couples rights and responsibilities similar, but not equal, to those of civil marriage. The 2011 Irish census revealed 143,600 cohabiting couples, up from 77,000 in 2002. This included 4,042 in same-sex relationships, up from 1,300.

== Background ==
=== Law Reform Commission ===
In December 2000, as part of the Second Programme of Law Reform, the government requested the Law Reform Commission of Ireland to examine the rights and duties of cohabitees. In April 2004, the commission published a consultation paper with provisional recommendations on legal issues related to cohabiting relationships. The report included an analysis of issues for same-sex couples. Following responses, the final report was launched in December 2006 by Justice Minister Michael McDowell.

The consultation proposals called for legal 'presumed' recognition of "qualifying" cohabiting relationships. "Qualifying cohabitees" were defined as unmarried same-sex or opposite-sex cohabiting couples in a 'marriage-like' relationships of 2 years (or 3 years in some cases), to be determined by the courts. The commission reviewed such areas as property, succession, maintenance, pensions, social welfare and tax, and recommended some changes in the law to provide rights for qualifying cohabitees. These rights would be applied by the court on application as distinct from the 'automatic' rights of legal marriage. The commission took care not to propose anything which would equate cohabitation with marriage due to concerns that such a proposal might violate the constitutional protection of the family. The paper also included recommendations on other steps that cohabiting couples should take, including writing wills and defining power of attorney, among others.

=== Constitutional review ===
The all-party Oireachtas Committee on the Constitution, re-established in December 2002, was conducting a review of the entire Constitution of Ireland. In October 2004, it invited submissions on the articles related to the family. Chairman Denis O'Donovan stated that it was examining these articles "to ascertain the extent to which they are serving the good of individuals and the community, with a view to deciding whether changes in them would bring about a greater balance between the two." Among the many issues raised by the committee were the definition of the family and the rights of same-sex couples to marry.

The relevant provisions were Articles 40.3, 41 and 42. Article 41 states:

The State pledges itself to guard with special care the institution of marriage, on which the family is founded, and to protect it against attack.

The committee held oral hearings in spring 2005 and received an unexpectedly large volume of written submissions with at least 60% being opposed to any constitutional changes to marriage or the family, including from members of Pro Life Campaign, Family Solidarity and the Mother and Child Campaign. The final report, the tenth interim report of the committee, was launched by Taoiseach Bertie Ahern on 24 January 2006. It recommended no change to the constitutional definitions, as it expected such a referendum to fail. It suggested that there should instead be legislation for a civil partnership registration open to same-sex or opposite-sex couples which would confer succession, maintenance and taxation rights. Controversially, it also recommended that the 'presumed' recognition of cohabiting partners by the courts, as recommended by the Law Reform Commission, should also be legislated for, but only for opposite-sex couples. The basis for the limitation was that it would be easy for the courts to determine the validity of an opposite-sex relationship if there were children.

=== Colley Report ===
On 20 December 2005, Minister for Justice Michael McDowell announced that he was creating a working group in the Department of Justice, Equality and Law Reform to provide options for government consideration. This announcement came on the day after Belfast in Northern Ireland held the first of the new UK civil partnership registration ceremonies. The government said that it would legislate following the report, but Taoiseach Bertie Ahern also said there might not be time to do so before the upcoming election. Chaired by former Teachta Dála Anne Colley, this working group included the Gay and Lesbian Equality Network (GLEN; Líonra Comhionannais do Dhaoine Aeracha agus Leispiacha), which said it expected a recommendation for civil marriage. The group facilitated a conference on the topic in May 2006 as input to its reports, which was attended by experts from countries that had introduced civil unions or same-sex marriage. During his speech, McDowell was interrupted by members of the Ancient Order of Hibernians opposed to the government plans.

Initially to report by March 2006, the group presented its report to the government in November 2006. They recommended that a civil partnership scheme would resolve most of the issues for same-sex and cohabiting couples, while providing less benefits than marriage. Offering civil marriage to same-sex couples would be open to a constitutional challenge. They also recommended a legal presumption of partnership for couples who have lived together for three years, or have children together. No recommendations were made for couples in non-conjugal relationships due to lack of research. The cabinet reviewed the report, but no legislation was introduced before the 2007 general election, and in the intervening period the government rejected opposition legislation, saying that legislation should await the Supreme Court appeal in Zappone v. Revenue Commissioners.

=== Other statutory bodies and NGOs ===
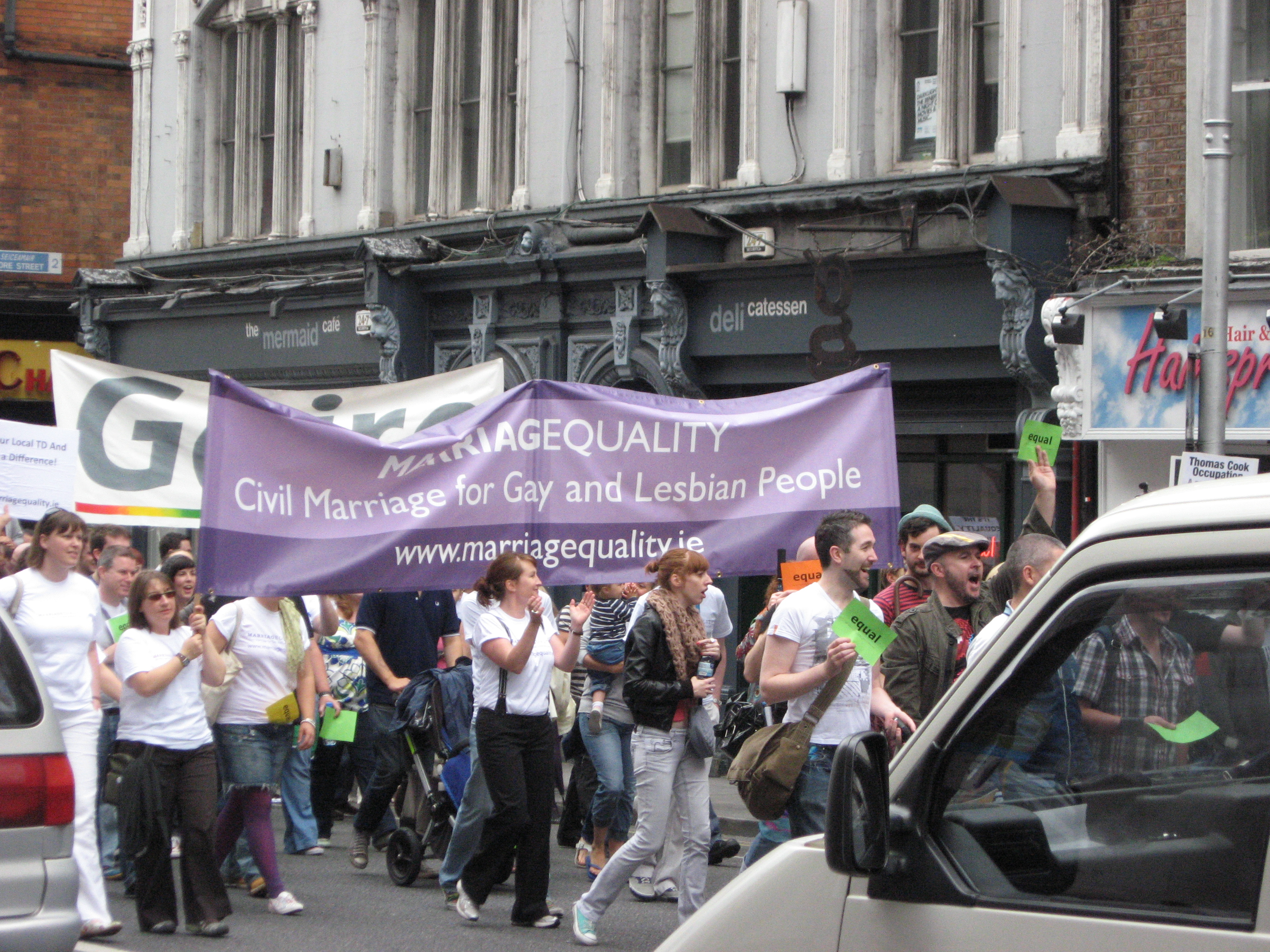
"MarriagEquality" supporting same-sex marriage in Ireland at a demonstration in Dublin, 2009

Since the early 2000s, various statutory bodies have issued reports calling for the recognition of de facto same-sex and opposite-sex relationships, In January 2001, the Equality Authority produced a report on same-sex partnerships in Ireland. In May 2002, it issued its formal report on equality for lesbians, gays and bisexuals, which highlighted the lack of recognition for same-sex couples in Irish law. In a departure from the norm, the report recommended legislative changes. These were to give legal recognition to same-sex couples and to provide equality with married couples in the areas of adoption, inheritance and taxation to eliminate discrimination. Likewise, in April 2003 the National Economic and Social Forum (NESF) published a report calling for the implementation of equality policies for gay, lesbian and bisexual people, and for the Law Reform Commission to consider models to achieve equal rights for same-sex couples in its then upcoming report.

In a report on de facto couples presented to the Justice Minister in May 2006, the Irish Human Rights Commission (IHRC), which merged with the Equality Authority in 2014 to form the Irish Human Rights and Equality Commission (Coimisiún na hÉireann um Chearta an Duine agus Comhionannas), evaluated international standards in dealing with unmarried couples, and assessed the changes needed in Irish law from a human rights perspective. The Commission called for legal recognition of all de facto relationships, but did not call for civil marriage to be made available to same-sex couples. The IHRC also released a report on the civil partnership scheme in January 2009. Legal recognition of partnership rights and addressing inequalities in family law were a strategic objective of the Irish Council for Civil Liberties (ICCL) for 2004–2009. In a December 2004 submission, it welcomed the Law Reform proposals, but said that registered unions were necessary. In a 2005 radio interview, it added that full civil marriage would not be likely to succeed in a referendum. However, its May 2006 report on the issue, "Equality for All Families" (Comhionannas do Gach Teaghlach) launched by ICCL founder Kader Asmal, called for legislated partnership registration and revisions to the constitutional provisions on civil marriage and the family, to give improved protection to children. This revision, which might require a referendum, should include a right to marry irrespective of sexual orientation.

== Civil partnerships ==
Laws regarding same-sex partnerships in Europe¹ Marriage Civil union Limited domestic recognition (cohabitation) Unrecognized Constitution limits marriage to opposite-sex couples ¹ May include recent laws or court decisions that have not yet entered into effect.

=== Summary ===
Civil partnerships (Irish: páirtnéireacht shibhialta, pronounced [ˈpˠaːɾˠtʲnʲeːɾʲəxt̪ˠ ˈhɪvʲiəl̪ˠt̪ˠə]), introduced by the Civil Partnership and Certain Rights and Obligations of Cohabitants Act 2010, gave same-sex couples rights and responsibilities similar, but not equal to, those of civil marriage. The ability to enter into a civil partnership ended on 16 November 2015. Constitutional protections granted to spouses, such as the spouse of a witness not being compelled to give evidence against their spouse in most cases, is one example of protections granted under civil partnerships. Spouses may further claim privilege in so far as necessary to protect the constitutional right to marital privacy. No such constitutional protections existed for civil partnerships. Further inequalities in relation to the family, immigration and other types of Irish law existed. The legislation also provided rights for participants in long-term cohabiting relationships (opposite-sex or same-sex) who had not entered into a civil partnership or marriage. The following entry focuses primarily on the same-sex civil partnership aspect of the act, as opposed to the cohabitation aspect.

The Civil Partnership Act came into effect on 1 January 2011. It had been expected that the first ceremonies would not take place until April 2011 due to a three-month waiting period required by law for all civil ceremonies. However, the legislation provided a mechanism for exemptions to be sought through the courts, and the first partnership, which was between two men, was registered on 7 February 2011. While this ceremony was carried out publicly in the Civil Registration Office in Dublin, the mainstream media were not present. It was not until 5 April 2011, the date originally anticipated as the date for the first ceremonies, that the media covered a civil partnership. This partnership ceremony, which was between Hugh Walsh and Barry Dignam, also took place in Dublin.

Registration of civil partnerships discontinued on the day same-sex marriage legislation came into effect in November 2015, though existing civil partners are permitted to retain their relationship status, as there is no automatic conversion from a civil partnership to marriage.

=== Legal history ===
==== Position before civil partnerships ====
In March 2004, there was controversy in Dáil Éireann surrounding a definition of "spouse" when it was claimed that the Minister for Social and Family Affairs, Mary Coughlan, was seeking to exclude non-married partners from social welfare legislation. The exclusion was a government response to a finding by the Equality Tribunal that a same-sex couple was discriminated against in travel privileges. The Civil Registration Act 2004 included a prohibition of same-sex marriage. The act explicitly declared that there was an "impediment to a marriage" if "both parties are of the same sex". In December 2006, the High Court held in Zappone v. Revenue Commissioners that marriage as defined in the Irish Constitution was between "a man and a woman" and that there was no breach of rights in the refusal of the Revenue Commissioners to recognise foreign same-sex marriages.

==== Early bills ====
In December 2004, Independent Senator David Norris, who had been central to the 1970s and 1980s Campaign for Homosexual Law Reform and had been successful in the European Court of Human Rights in Norris v. Ireland, tabled a private member's bill on civil partnerships in Seanad Éireann. The bill provided for the recognition of unmarried partnerships, both same-sex and opposite-sex cohabiting couples. It defined eligibility for a civil partnership and the process of registering a civil partnership. Rather than listing all the rights of a civil partner, it specified that all the rights of marriage would apply to anyone in a civil partnership. However, it specifically defined the dissolution process and the process for recognising foreign civil partnerships. Norris said the bill was initiated "to protect the rights of adults who find themselves in relationships outside the conventional bonds of marriage" and "to meet the requirements of those who are making arrangements in their personal lives outside the formalities of marriage" and who also "need to be supported in the creation of mature stable relationships". Norris said he had done substantial research in order to achieve consensus on a moderate bill which took on board stated reservations. The debate, including contributions from the Minister for Justice, Equality and Law Reform, Michael McDowell, took place on 16 February 2005. The majority of speakers supported the principles behind the bill and complimented Senator Norris on his work. Some expressed reservations due to the constitutional protection of the family. A government amendment designed to postpone a vote attracted much acrimony. This postponement was to allow for input from then ongoing investigations: the Law Reform Commission, the High Court case Zappone v. Revenue Commissioners on the recognition of a Canadian marriage and the Constitutional Review Committee. Eventually, it was agreed to debate the bill but adjourn a vote indefinitely.

In December 2006, on the same day as the High Court judgment in Zappone, Brendan Howlin, an opposition Labour Party TD, tabled a private member's bill on civil partnerships in Dáil Éireann. Similar to the Norris bill in its provisions, this bill defined a civil union as providing all the rights and duties as defined for marriage, but specifically limited civil unions to same-sex couples. It also provided for adoption by couples in such unions. The debate, again including contributions from Justice Minister Michael McDowell, took place in February 2007. All speakers supported civil unions for same-sex couples and complimented Deputy Howlin on the bill. One expressed reservations about adoption. Minister McDowell claimed that the bill violated the constitutional provisions on marriage and the family. Government speakers said that civil unions needed to be introduced but that more time was needed to take account of the ongoing Supreme Court case and investigation work in the Department of Justice. The government amended the bill to delay debate for six months. As expected, the bill then fell when the Dáil was dissolved in the intervening period for the 2007 general election. Deputy Howlin said that the real reason for the delay was that the government did not want to enact this type of social legislation in the face of an election. Labour again brought their bill before the new house on 31 October 2007 but the government again voted the bill down. The Green Party, now in government also voted in opposition to the bill, with spokesperson Ciarán Cuffe arguing that the bill was unconstitutional but without giving a reasoning. The government committed itself to introducing its own bill for registered civil partnerships by 31 March 2008, a date it would fail to meet.

==== Government legislation ====
The Green Party entered government with Fianna Fáil in 2007, and a commitment to legislation introducing civil partnerships was agreed in the Programme for Government in June of that year. On 24 June 2008, the government announced the publication of a civil partnership bill. In response to the legislation, Senator Jim Walsh put forward a party motion to counter the bill. The Irish Times reported that around 30 unidentified backbenchers had signed the motion. One anonymous senator was quoted as claiming that the motion "would have considerable support from the more conservative sections of the parliamentary party". Taoiseach Brian Cowen responded by insisting that the registration of same-sex couples would not interfere with the constitutional status of marriage. Cowen noted that the bill had been drawn up in close consultation with the Attorney General, Paul Gallagher, and had been included in the Programme for Government. The motion was referred to the parliamentary party's justice committee on 1 July 2008. A Fianna Fáil spokesperson was quoted as saying that there was "broad support" within the party for the legislation, while the Taoiseach and the Minister for Justice, Equality and Law Reform, Dermot Ahern, reaffirmed the constitutional compatibility of the law. The announcement was denounced as inadequate by the opposition Labour and Sinn Féin parties. Sinn Féin spokesperson Aengus Ó Snodaigh commented that "the government must do better".

The civil partnership bill was introduced on 26 June 2009. Dermot Ahern, the Minister for Justice, Equality and Law Reform, introduced the bill's second stage on 3 December. He said that consequent modifications to the finance and social welfare provisions would come into effect once the bill was passed. There was further second stage debate on the bill on 21 January 2010. The second stage finished on 27 January, and the committee stage of the bill was completed on 27 May. The bill was passed in the final stage by the Dáil without a vote on 1 July. It was passed in the final stage in the Seanad by a vote of 48–4 on 8 July, and was signed by President Mary McAleese on 19 July. Minister Ahern said, "This is one of the most important pieces of civil rights legislation to be enacted since independence. Its legislative advance has seen an unprecedented degree of unity and support within both Houses of the Oireachtas."

8 July 2010 vote in Seanad Éireann
Party	Voted for	Voted against	Absent (Did not vote)
G Fianna Fáil	22: Martin Brady; James Carroll; John Carty; Donie Cassidy; Maria Corrigan; Mark Daly; John Ellis; Geraldine Feeney; Camillus Glynn; Cecilia Keaveney; Terry Leyden; Marc MacSharry; Lisa McDonald; Paschal Mooney; Brian Ó Domhnaill; Francis O'Brien; Denis O'Donovan; Ned O'Sullivan; Ann Ormonde; Kieran Phelan; Mary White; Diarmuid Wilson	3: John Hanafin; Labhrás Ó Murchú; Jim Walsh	2: Larry Butler; Ivor Callely
Fine Gael	12: Paul Bradford; Paddy Burke; Jerry Buttimer; Ciarán Cannon; Paudie Coffey; Maurice Cummins; Frances Fitzgerald; Fidelma Healy Eames; Nicky McFadden; Joe O'Reilly; Eugene Regan; Liam Twomey	–	3: Paul Coghlan; Paschal Donohoe; John Paul Phelan
Labour Party	5: Ivana Bacik; Dominic Hannigan; Michael McCarthy; Brendan Ryan; Alex White	–	1: Phil Prendergast
G Green Party	3: Dan Boyle; Mark Dearey; Niall Ó Brolcháin	–	–
Sinn Féin	1: Pearse Doherty	–	–
Independent	5: David Norris; Fiona O'Malley; Joe O'Toole; Feargal Quinn; Shane Ross	1: Rónán Mullen	1: Eoghan Harris
Total (Note: Seanad Éireann has 59 voting members. The Cathaoirleach, Pat Moylan, votes only in case of a tied vote.)	48	4	7
Total	81.4%	6.8%	11.9%

The Minister for Justice signed a commencement order on 23 December 2010. The act came into force on 1 January 2011. The date of commencement of the act was dependent on further legislation in the areas of taxation and social welfare, which was enacted separately. The Social Welfare and Pensions Act 2010 was passed by the Dáil on 14 December and the Seanad on 17 December 2010. Tax codes were amended in July 2011 under the Finance (No. 3) Act 2011 to take account of civil partnerships. The act, in the main, is retrospective to 1 January 2011 and it created virtual parity, in taxation matters, between civil partners on the one hand and married people on the other hand.

=== Recognition of foreign partnerships ===
Certain foreign partnerships and same-sex marriages had been recognised as civil partnerships since 13 January 2011. While Glenn Cunningham and Adriano Vilar are often cited as the first same-sex couple to have their civil partnership formally recognised in Ireland, in fact several hundred couples were recognised together at the exactly the same time. The couple had formed a civil partnership at a ceremony in Northern Ireland in 2010.

Section 5 of the Civil Partnership and Certain Rights and Obligations of Cohabitants Act 2010 stated the criteria used to govern which classes of relationships could be recognised. They were:

- the relationship was exclusive in nature
- the relationship was permanent unless the parties dissolved it through the courts
- the relationship had been registered under the law of that jurisdiction
- the rights and obligations attendant on the relationship were, in the opinion of the Minister, sufficient to indicate that the relationship would be treated comparably to a civil partnership

The recognition was formally authorised by statutory instruments, four of which were passed: in 2010, listing 33 relationship types in 27 jurisdictions; in 2011, adding 6 relationships; in 2012, adding 4; and in 2013, adding 14. The French civil solidarity pact was not included, nor were some other legal relationships, for example, the Dutch registered partnership and some of the domestic partnerships in the United States. The reason is that these kinds of relationships can be dissolved by agreement between the parties (that is by both parties signing a document with a lawyer), not through the courts.

=== Statistics ===
2,071 civil partnerships were registered in Ireland between 2011 and 2015; 536 in 2011, 429 in 2012, 338 in 2013, 392 in 2014, and 376 in 2015. Most partnerships were between two men (1,298), and a majority were performed in Leinster, particularly in the Greater Dublin Area.

=== End of civil partnerships ===
Following Ireland's legalisation of same-sex marriage in 2015, the ability to enter into a civil partnership was closed off. As of 16 November 2015, no further civil partnerships are granted in Ireland and existing civil partners only retain that status if they do not marry. Any civil partnership converted into a marriage is dissolved.

== Same-sex marriage ==
=== Court case ===
In November 2004, Katherine Zappone and Ann Louise Gilligan were granted leave by the High Court of Ireland to pursue a claim to have their September 2003 Vancouver marriage recognised for the filing of joint tax returns in Ireland. The case was heard in October 2006. The judgment was delivered in December 2006 and found that the Irish Constitution had always meant for marriage to be between "a man and a woman". The case was appealed to the Supreme Court in February 2007. It came before the Supreme Court in 2012, although returned to the High Court to challenge different elements of law, specifically the Civil Registration Act 2004 and the Civil Partnership Act 2010.

=== Preparation for the referendum ===
The coalition government, which took office in March 2011, convened a Constitutional Convention to discuss proposed amendments to the Constitution of Ireland, including plans to introduce same-sex marriage. On 10 July 2012, the Dáil referred the issue of whether to make provision for same-sex marriage to the Constitutional Convention, to report back in a year. On 14 April 2013, the convention approved provisions allowing for same-sex marriage, to be discussed by the Oireachtas and be put to a public referendum. On 2 July 2013, the Constitutional Convention delivered the formal report to the Oireachtas, which had four months to respond. On 5 November 2013, it was announced that a referendum to legalise same-sex marriage would be held in the first half of 2015. On 1 July 2014, Taoiseach Enda Kenny announced that the same-sex marriage referendum would take place in spring 2015. The referendum was held on 22 May 2015.

With the signing into law of the Children and Family Relationships Act 2015 on 6 April 2015, same-sex couples have the ability to adopt stepchildren, as well as being able to obtain parental recognition in assisted reproduction methods. On 18 January 2016, key provisions of the law (including spouses, stepparents, civil partners and cohabiting partners being able to apply to become guardians of a child or for custody) went into effect, following the signing of a commencement order by the Minister for Justice and Equality, Frances Fitzgerald. Portions of the act allowing for joint adoption, which never went into effect as no commencement order was signed, were repealed in 2017 after passage of the Adoption (Amendment) Act 2017, which legalised joint adoption by married same-sex couples.

=== "Marriage Equality" referendum ===
How the Irish electorate voted, by constituency: 72.5%–75% 70%–72.49% 67.5%–69.99% 65%–67.49% 62.5%–64.99% 60%–62.49% 57.5%–59.99% 55%–57.49% 52.5%–54.99% 50%–52.49% 48.58%

The amendment to the Constitution was moved on 21 January 2015. The "Marriage Equality" (Irish: Comhionannas Pósta) (Note: In Irish, same-sex marriage is known as pósadh comhghnéis or more commonly as comhionannas pósta (pronounced [ˈkuːan̪ˠən̪ˠəsˠ ˈpˠoːsˠt̪ˠə, ˈpˠɔ-], meaning "marriage equality"). The term "marriage equality" is widely used in public discourse and in Irish media.) referendum proposed to add the following text to Article 41 of the Constitution: Marriage may be contracted in accordance with law by two persons without distinction as to their sex. (Note: Irish: Féadfaidh beirt, gan beann ar a ngnéas, conradh pósta a dhéanamh de réir dlí.) In March 2015, the Department of Justice and Equality published the general scheme of a new marriage bill. The bill set out the changes to be made to legislation if the proposed amendment was approved. These changes included removing the legislative bar on same-sex couples marrying (though the wording of the amendment is self-executing and designed to invalidate it irrespective of legislative delay), addressing the situation of civil partnerships, and updating terminology of existing legislation to reflect the new provision.

The "Marriage Equality" referendum was held on 22 May 2015. With votes from all 43 constituencies counted, the 62.07% "Yes" vote assured the passage of the referendum. In the aftermath of the result, Minister for Justice and Equality Frances Fitzgerald stated that legislation would be brought through the Oireachtas by summer (i.e. sometime in June or July 2015) to make same-sex marriage a reality. However, an unsuccessful legal challenge contesting the validity of the referendum delayed the legislation from going to government and the Oireachtas. The referendum results were published in Iris Oifigiúil on 26 May.

Thirty-fourth Amendment of the Constitution (Marriage Equality) Bill 2015
Choice	Votes	%
For	1,201,607	62.07
Against	734,300	37.93
Total	1,935,907	100.00
Valid votes	1,935,907	99.29
Invalid/blank votes	13,818	0.71
Total votes	1,949,725	100.00
Registered voters/turnout	3,221,681	60.52

=== Marriage Act 2015 ===
On 16 September 2015, following the High Court's rejection of the legal challenge contesting the validity of the referendum result, Fitzgerald brought a same-sex marriage bill before cabinet. A spokesperson for the Department of Justice and Equality stated that "the aim is to have the bill enacted as quickly as possible, subject to the legislative process, so that the first same-sex marriages can take place this year." Under the legislation, the first same-sex marriages would be those of couples who convert a notification of their intention to register a civil partnership into a notification of their intention to marry. The bill passed all stages of the legislative process in the Oireachtas on 22 October 2015. On 29 October, the bill was signed into law by the Presidential Commission. The Marriage Act 2015 (Irish: An tAcht um Pósadh, 2015, pronounced [ənˠ ˌt̪ˠaxt̪ˠ ʊmˠ ˈpˠoːsˠuː, -sˠə]) also provides for the recognition of same-sex marriages validly performed abroad: A marriage under the law of a place other than the State shall not be precluded from being recognised as a marriage by reason of the sex of the parties to the marriage. (Note: Irish: Ní choiscfear pósadh faoi dhlí áite seachas an Stát a aithint mar phósadh mar gheall ar ghnéas na bpáirtithe sa phósadh.)

Though most same-sex couples seeking to marry are required to give three months notice (as is the case for opposite-sex couples), same-sex couples already in a civil partnership were allowed to make use of a 5-day fast track provision in the legislation. As of 16 November 2015, same-sex couples who married abroad have their marriages recognised in Ireland. The first marriage ceremonies of same-sex couples occurred the following day, on 17 November 2015. The first couple to marry in Ireland were Richard Dowling and Cormac Gollogly on Tuesday, 17 November in Clonmel, County Tipperary. The couple said they "[were] really delighted to be able to do it and we are 12 years together so it was obviously the next move. Having a full marriage was important to us so now we can relax and get old together."

=== Subsequent changes ===
On 5 May 2016, the Minister for Children and Youth Affairs, James Reilly, announced that the government had approved the publication of a new adoption bill. The bill would amend the Adoption Act 2010 and the Children and Family Relationships Act 2015 and give legislative effect to the Thirty-first Amendment of the Constitution of Ireland. The purposes of the bill were to allow children to be adopted by their foster carers, where they have cared for the child for at least 18 months, and to allow two people regardless of marital status to adopt children, thus granting married same-sex couples the right to adopt. The bill would also allow for the adoption of a child by civil partners and cohabiting couples, and give children a greater say in the adoption process, among many other reforms to the adoption system. The bill passed the Dáil on 30 November 2016, and received approval by the Seanad on 13 June 2017. It was signed into law by President Michael D. Higgins on 19 July 2017, becoming the Adoption (Amendment) Act 2017. The commencement order was signed by the Minister for Children and Youth Affairs, Katherine Zappone, on 18 October 2017 and the law went into effect the following day.

In January 2019, the Minister for Employment Affairs and Social Protection, Regina Doherty, announced that the government had published a bill to amend the Civil Registration Act 2004. This bill would allow lesbian couples who have had donor-assisted children to be automatically registered as the child's parents. Under the changes, parents could choose the labels "mother", "father" or "parent", enabling the non-biological mother to be legally registered as a co-parent. Previously, only the biological mother could be named on the child's birth certificate. The legislation passed the Daíl in March 2019, and the Seanad in May, and was signed into law by President Higgins on 23 May 2019. It came into effect that same day.

=== Statistics ===
91 same-sex marriages were performed between 16 November and 31 December 2015; 47 between two men and 44 between two women. Data published by the Department of Social Protection a few days ahead of the first anniversary of the "Marriage Equality" referendum showed that 412 same-sex marriages had been performed in Ireland since November 2015, distributed by county as follows: Dublin (213), Cork (43), Limerick (25), Wicklow (17), Galway (14), Donegal (11), Kildare (11) and Wexford (11), Kerry (9), Louth (8), Kilkenny (7), Offaly (6), Meath (5) and Waterford (5), Cavan (4), Sligo (4) and Tipperary (4), Laois (3) and Mayo (3), Longford (2), Roscommon (2) and Westmeath (2), Carlow (1), Leitrim (1) and Monaghan (1), and Clare (0). 1,082 same-sex couples married in Ireland in the one year following the law's entry into force, averaging 21 same-sex weddings a week. 450 of these marriages were performed in Dublin, 93 in Cork, 56 in Wicklow and 48 in Kildare. The counties with the fewest same-sex marriages were Longford at two, followed by three in Roscommon and five in Leitrim.

1,056 same-sex marriages were performed in 2016, the first full year in which same-sex couples could marry; 606 were male unions and 450 were female unions. 6,580 same-sex marriages had been performed in Ireland by the end of 2025. Figures for 2020 are much lower than previous years because of the restrictions in place due to the COVID-19 pandemic.

Number of marriages performed in Ireland
Year	Same-sex marriages			Opposite-sex marriages	Total marriages	% same-sex
Year	Female	Male	Total	Opposite-sex marriages	Total marriages	% same-sex
2015	44	47	91	21,934	22,025	0.41%
2016	450	606	1,056	20,514	21,570	4.90%
2017	335	424	759	20,503	21,262	3.57%
2018	292	372	664	19,725	20,389	3.26%
2019	287	353	640	19,033	19,673	3.25%
2020	144	170	314	9,209	9,523	3.30%
2021	248	252	500	16,717	17,217	2.90%
2022	313	305	618	22,555	23,173	2.67%
2023	322	324	646	20,513	21,159	3.05%
2024	343	325	668	19,680	20,348	3.28%
2025	310	314	624	19,274	19,898	3.14%

=== Religious performance ===
Most religious denominations in Ireland do not support same-sex marriage and do not allow their clergy to bless or officiate at marriages of same-sex couples. The Quakers are the only mainstream church in Ireland that performs same-sex marriages. In 2018, a motion supporting and allowing such marriages in their meeting houses was passed at an annual yearly meeting held in Limerick.

The Catholic Church opposes same-sex marriage and does not allow its priests to officiate at such marriages. In December 2023, the Holy See published Fiducia supplicans, a declaration allowing Catholic priests to bless couples who are not considered to be married according to church teaching, including the blessing of same-sex couples. The Primate of All Ireland and Archbishop of Armagh, Eamon Martin, said, "At a practical level as a priest, I welcome the clarity in this document. The pope is very clear that these pastoral blessings are not a kind of a liturgical or ritual acknowledgment that these unions are equivalent or in any way analogous to the marriage between a man or a woman. At the same time, it shows that the issues and the hurts experienced by people identifying as LGBT+ have certainly been heard very loudly within the church. I do hope that people who may have felt excluded in the past, will see this as some step towards them with the love and mercy of Christ." The Bishop of Waterford and Lismore, Alphonsus Cullinan, also welcomed the declaration, "This document is a valuable gift since it focuses on the beauty of blessings flowing from the heart of God and is particularly welcome before Christmas when we celebrate the greatest blessing on our world – Christ Our Saviour – who is born among us. He is the One to whom we turn for spiritual health and goodness and the fulness of life." The Archbishop of Dublin, Dermot Farrell, issued a statement on 8 January 2024 that "couples in so-called irregular unions, including same sex couples, cannot be refused a blessing by a Catholic priest".

The Presbyterian Church in Ireland subscribes to the Westminster Confession of Faith which affirms that marriage "is to be between one man and one woman: neither is it lawful for any man to have more than one wife, nor for any woman to have more than one husband, at the same time". The Reformed Presbyterian Church of Ireland also subscribes to the Westminster Confession of Faith and its definition of marriage. The Methodist Church in Ireland states that marriage is "a relationship, intended as permanent, between one man and one woman" in its "Practical Expressions of Methodist Belief" document. The church opposes "all debased forms of sexuality and sexual practice, whether heterosexual or homosexual" but asks for "understanding and tolerance for those whose sexual orientation is towards those of their own gender" and encourages the wider church "to give a greater lead in the education of society, including Christians, regarding this issue, so that ignorance, prejudice and fear may disappear". The Association of Baptist Churches in Ireland affirms "the creation ordinance of marriage as the lifelong union of one man and one woman" in its Doctrinal Statement.

The Church of Ireland affirms in its canon law that "according to our Lord's teaching that marriage is in its purpose a union permanent and life-long, for better or worse, till death do them part, of one man with one woman, to the exclusion of all others on either side". In 2012, the General Synod of the Church of Ireland reaffirmed this teaching in a motion on "Human Sexuality in the Context of Christian Belief". The motion added that the church "recognises for itself and of itself, no other understanding of marriage" and acknowledged that members of the church "have at times hurt and wounded people by words and actions, in relation to human sexuality". The church affirmed a "continuing commitment to love our neighbour, and opposition to all unbiblical and uncharitable actions and attitudes in respect of human sexuality from whatever perspective, including bigotry, hurtful words or actions, and demeaning or damaging language". In October 2023, the synod of the Diocese of Dublin and Glendalough passed a motion calling on the Church of Ireland to permit same-sex blessings. The dioceses of Tuam, Limerick and Killaloe and Cashel and Ossory approved similar resolutions a few weeks later.

== Public debate ==
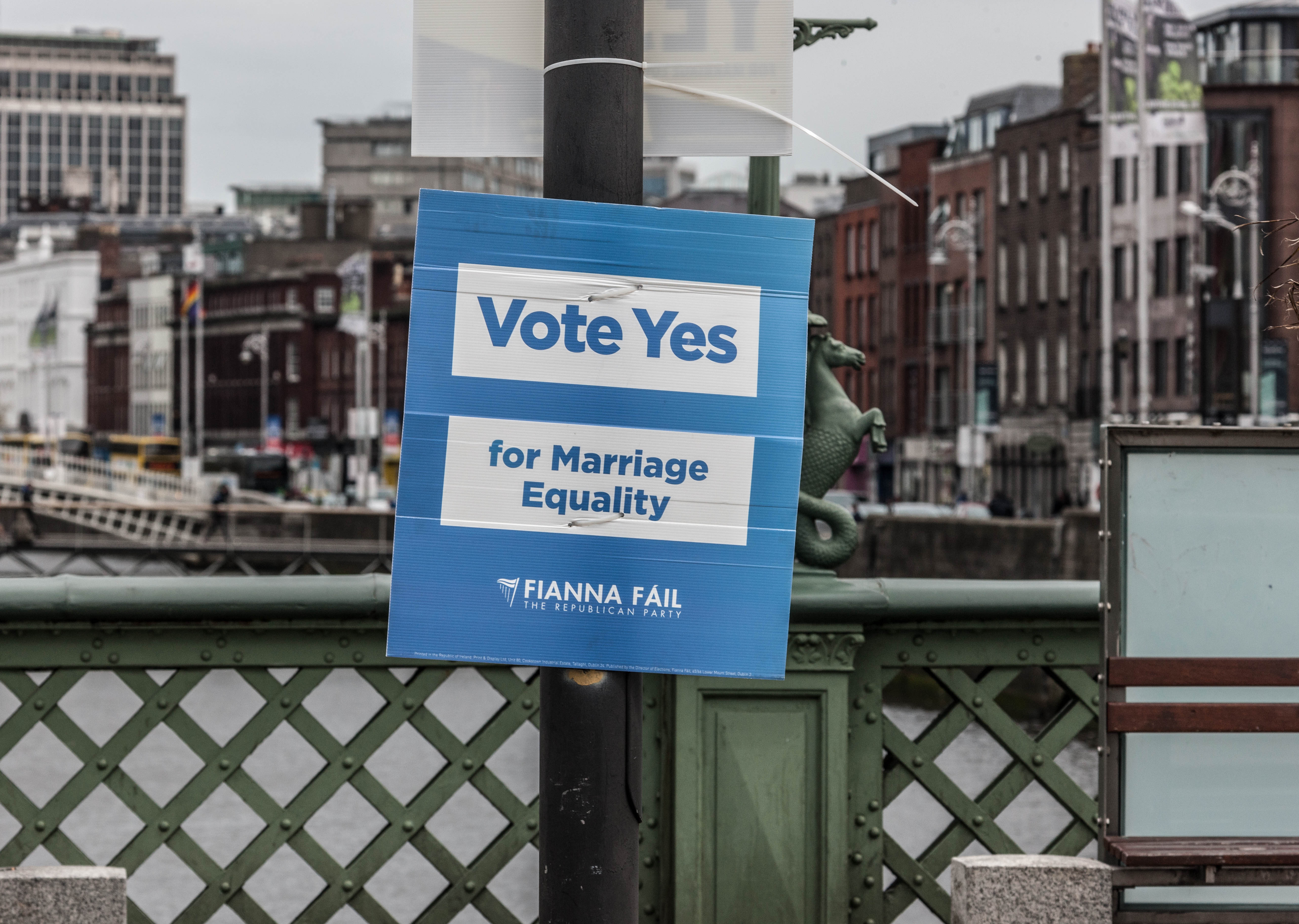
Fianna Fáil poster in support of the Thirty-fourth Amendment

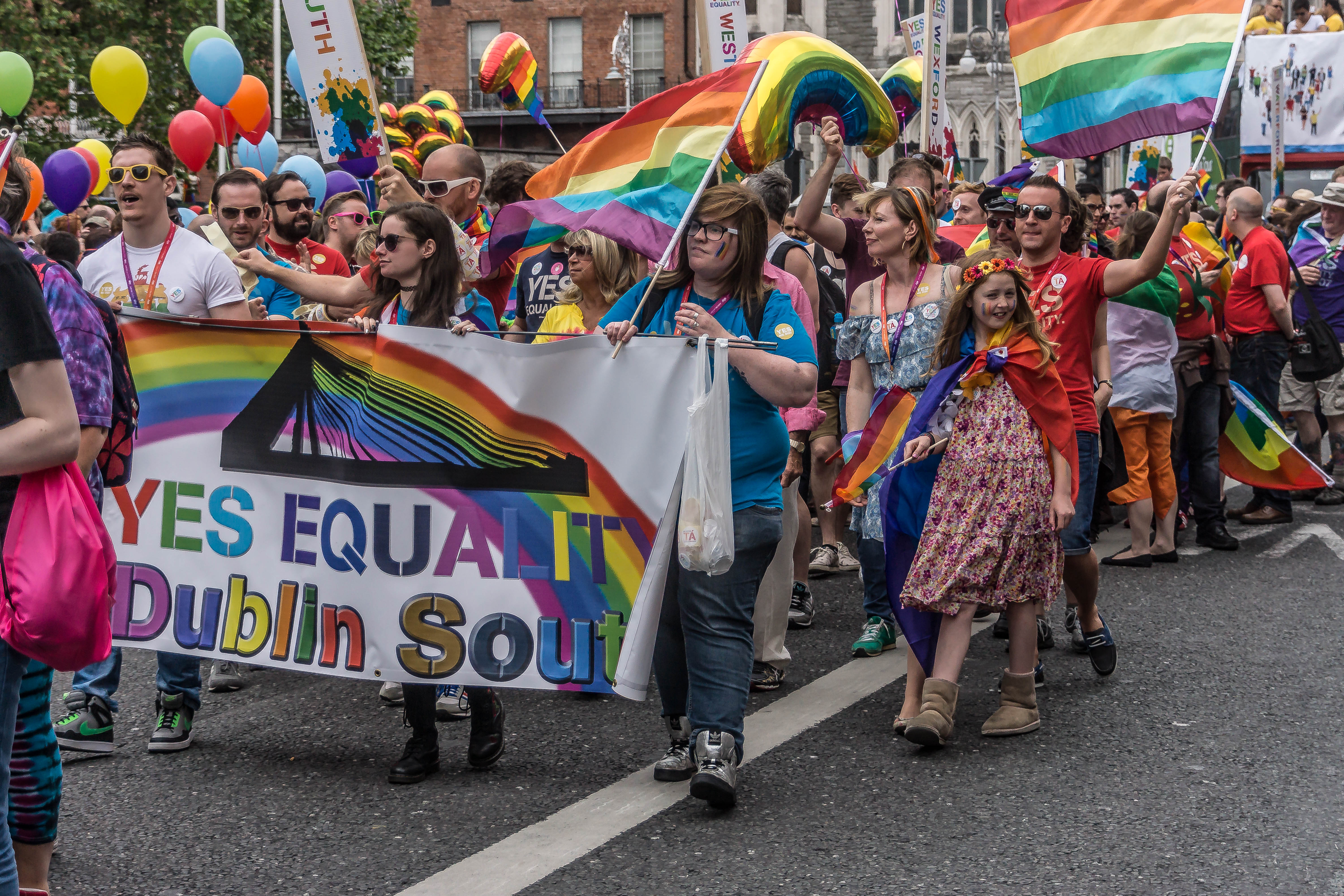
Participants at Dublin Pride celebrating the success of the "Yes" campaign, June 2015

=== Campaigns ===
Following the decriminalisation of buggery in 1993, LGBT rights was not a high-profile issue in Ireland. From 2001 however, Irish media increasingly covered international developments on the recognition of same-sex partnerships. This has included coverage of reports on the issue, legal cases taken by Irish same-sex couples, surrogate parenthood, adoption, extra-legal same-sex unions, blessings and the foreign partnerships of Irish politicians. There was extensive coverage of the 2005 introduction of civil partnerships by the British Government, which applies to Northern Ireland.

Irish legislators began to comment publicly from 2003, some tentatively suggesting legislation, and some referring to Catholic teachings. Among the general public, reaction was favourable, with a 2005 online poll showing most respondents seeing some recognition as inevitable and acceptable. More rigorous public polls taken during 2006 showed an increasing majority of the population, up to 80%, supporting the introduction of some partnership rights for same-sex couples, with a slim majority favouring marriage. The numbers in favour of adoption by same-sex couples were lower but less clear. Some public and religious figures, including bishops in the Catholic Church, and in the Church of Ireland also proposed legal recognition in 2004, but in a form different from marriage. Existing and new gay organisations such as the Gay and Lesbian Equality Network, GLUE magazine and LGBT Noise began specifically campaigning for recognition in 2006.

At the 2002 general election, only the manifestos of the Green Party and the Labour Party explicitly referred to the rights of same-sex couples, but from 2004 all political parties, including the Fianna Fáil/Progressive Democrat government, produced policies or made statements in favour of varying forms of recognition. In 2004, Fine Gael was the first party to launch an explicit policy document supporting civil partnerships. In the run-up to the 2007 general election, the manifestos of all parties supported civil unions for same-sex couples, with Sinn Féin and the Green Party supporting civil marriage. All parties ran advertisements in the Gay Community News with commitments to same-sex couples. In 2012, Sinn Féin sought to provide opportunities to bring same-sex marriage to the fore by introducing motions of support at the city and county council level. By November 2013, all parties in the Dáil supported same-sex marriage: the Labour Party, the Green Party, the Socialist Party, Sinn Féin, Fianna Fáil, and Fine Gael.

=== Polling ===
A survey carried out in 2008 showed that 84% of Irish people supported civil marriage or civil partnerships for same-sex couples, with 58% (up from 51%) supporting full marriage rights in registry offices. The number who believed same-sex couples should only be allowed to have civil partnerships fell in the same period, from 33% to 26%. A public survey in October 2008 revealed that 62% of adults would vote "yes" in a referendum to extend civil marriage to same-sex couples. A breakdown of the results showed that support was strongest among younger people and in urban areas. Women were more supportive at 68% compared to 56% of men. There was slightly less support for same-sex couples being given the right to adopt. A total of 58% of those under 50 believed same-sex couples should be able to adopt, falling to 33% among the over-50s. A total of 54% believed the definition of the family unit in the Irish Constitution should be changed to include same-sex families.

A survey commissioned by MarriagEquality in February 2009 indicated that 62% of Irish people supported same-sex marriage and would vote in favour of it if a referendum were held. In September 2010, a survey by The Irish Times/Behaviour Attitudes of 1,006 people showed that 67% of respondents felt same-sex couples should be allowed to marry. This majority extended across all age groups, with the exception of the over-65s, and 66% of Catholics were in favour of same-sex marriage. Only 25% disagreed that same-sex couples should be allowed to marry, opposition that was concentrated among older people and those in rural areas. In terms of same-sex adoption, 46% were in support and 38% opposed; however, a majority of women, 18–44-year-olds, and urban dwellers supported the idea. The survey also showed that 91% of people would not think less of someone who came out as homosexual, while 60% felt the recent civil partnership legislation was not an attack on marriage.

A poll in March 2011 conducted by The Sunday Times/RED C showed that 73% of people supported allowing same-sex marriage, with 53% "agreeing strongly" with the idea, and 60% felt that same-sex couples should be allowed to adopt children. A poll in January 2012 conducted by RED C for the Department of Public Expenditure and Reform showed that 73% of voters supported the idea of same-sex marriages being recognised in the Irish Constitution, and a late 2012 poll by Millward Brown Lansdowne showed that 75% of respondents would vote in favour of extending marriage to same-sex couples.

A poll in November 2013 by RED C for Paddy Power showed that 76% of voters intended to support the introduction of same-sex marriage in any referendum, with 18% opposed and 6% undecided (with the undecideds excluded, the ratio was 81% support and 19% against). Support was highest among women (85%), those under 44 (87%), Labour supporters (96%) and those living in Dublin and commuter counties (83%). A February 2014 poll by RED C for RTÉ's Prime Time and the Business Post showed that 76% of voters would vote "yes" to the introduction of same-sex marriage in any referendum. A poll conducted two months later by The Irish Times and Ipsos MRBI found that 67% of respondents would vote in favour of same-sex marriage and 21% against, with 12% undecided. When the undecided were excluded, 76% were in favour and 24% against.

The 2015 Eurobarometer found that 80% of Irish people thought same-sex marriage should be allowed throughout Europe, whilst 15% were against. A Pew Research Center poll, conducted between April and August 2017 and published in May 2018, showed that 66% of Irish people supported same-sex marriage, 27% were opposed and 7% did not know or had refused to answer. When divided by religion, 87% of religiously unaffiliated people, 80% of non-practicing Christians and 43% of church-attending Christians supported same-sex marriage. Opposition was 20% among 18–34-year-olds. The 2019 Eurobarometer found that 79% of Irish people thought same-sex marriage should be allowed throughout Europe, while 13% were opposed. The 2023 Eurobarometer showed that support had increased to 86%, while 9% were opposed. The survey also found that 83% of Irish people thought that "there is nothing wrong in a sexual relationship between two persons of the same sex", while 12% disagreed.

Opinion polls on the issue of same-sex marriage or voting intentions in the 2015 marriage referendum
Date	Conducted by	Sample size	In favour	Against	Neutral/Undecided (Note: Undecided or refused to answer)
21–23 April 2015	RED C/Business Post	1,000 voters	72%	20%	8%
13 April 2015	Amárach Research/RTÉ – Claire Byrne Live	838 adults	77%	14%	9%
23–24 March 2015	Ipsos MRBI/The Irish Times	1,200 voters	74%	26%	—N/a (Note: "Yes"/"No" percentages excluding respondents refusing to answer or uncertain.)
19–21 January 2015	RED C/Business Post	1,005 adults	77%	22%	1%
1–2 December 2014	Ipsos MRBI/The Irish Times	1,200 adults	71%	17%	12%
6–7 October 2014	Ipsos MRBI/The Irish Times	1,200 adults	76%	24%	—N/a
April 2014	Ipsos MRBI/The Irish Times	1,000 adults	67%	21%	12%
17–19 February 2014	RED C/Business Post – Prime Time	1,007 adults	76%	19%	5%
4–6 November 2013	RED C/Paddy Power	1,004 adults	76%	18%	6%
November 2012	Ipsos MRBI/The Irish Times	1,000 voters	53%	30%	17%

Support is strongest among younger voters. Sinn Féin and Labour voters are somewhat more in favour than Fine Gael and Fianna Fáil voters. Among those intending to vote "yes" in January 2015, 33/77 had "some reservations about same-sex marriage", and 29/77 had "some reservations about adoption by gay couples". A poll conducted a week before the referendum by The Irish Times showed that women supported same-sex marriage more than men.

== See also ==
- LGBTQ rights in the Republic of Ireland
- LGBTQ history in Ireland
- Recognition of same-sex unions in Europe
- He never married
