= 23rd Seanad =

Members of the Seanad from 2007 to 2011

←	22nd Seanad	24th Seanad	→

Overview
- Legislative body: Seanad Éireann
- Jurisdiction: Ireland
- Meeting place: Leinster House
- Term: 13 September 2007 – 20 April 2011
- Government: 27th government of Ireland (2007–2008); 28th government of Ireland (2008–2011)
- Members: 60
- Cathaoirleach: Pat Moylan (FF)
- Leas-Chathaoirleach: Paddy Burke (FG)
- Leader of the Seanad: Donie Cassidy (FF)

Sessions
- 1st: 13 September 2007 – 10 July 2008
- 2nd: 30 September 2008 – 15 July 2009
- 3rd: 23 September 2009 – 14 July 2010
- 4th: 29 September 2010 – 20 April 2011

The 23rd Seanad was in office from 2007 to 2011. An election to Seanad Éireann, the senate of the Oireachtas (Irish parliament) took place in July 2007, following the 2007 general election to the 30th Dáil on 24 May. There are 60 seats in the Seanad: 43 were elected on five vocational panels by serving politicians; 6 were elected in two university constituencies; and 11 were nominated by the Taoiseach. Under the Constitution of Ireland, a general election for the Seanad was required within 90 days of the dissolution of the 29th Dáil on 30 April 2007. Polls closed on 24 July 2007, and the Taoiseach's nominees were announced by Bertie Ahern on 3 August 2007. The 23rd Seanad first met at Leinster House on 13 September 2007. The term of the 23rd Seanad was from 13 September 2007 to 20 April 2011, remaining in session until the close of poll for the 24th Seanad.

== Cathaoirleach ==
On 13 September 2007, Pat Moylan (FF) was proposed as Cathaoirleach by Donie Cassidy (FF) and seconded by Dan Boyle (GP). He was elected without a division. On 26 September 2007, Paddy Burke (FG) was proposed as Leas-Chathaoirleach by Frances Fitzgerald (FG) and seconded by Maurice Cummins (FG).

== Composition of the 23rd Seanad ==
There are a total of 60 seats in the Seanad. There are 43 Senators elected by the vocational panels, 6 elected by the Universities and 11 are nominated by the Taoiseach.

The following table shows the composition by party when the 23rd Seanad first met on 13 September 2007.

Origin Party	Vocational panels					NUI	DU	Nominated	Total
Origin Party	Admin	Agri	Cult & Educ	Ind & Comm	Labour	NUI	DU	Nominated	Total
Fianna Fáil	4	5	3	5	5	0	0	6	28
Fine Gael	2	4	1	3	4	0	0	0	14
Labour Party	1	1	1	1	2	0	0	0	6
Green Party	0	0	0	0	0	0	0	2	2
Progressive Democrats	0	0	0	0	0	0	0	2	2
Sinn Féin	0	1	0	0	0	0	0	0	1
Independent	0	0	0	0	0	3	3	1	7
Total	7	11	5	9	11	3	3	11	60

=== Effect of changes ===
Party	2007^{1}	Nov. 2010^{2}	Mar. 2011^{3}
Fianna Fáil	28	25	26
Fine Gael	14	15	6
Labour Party	6	6	2
Green Party	2	3	3
Sinn Féin	1	0	0
Progressive Democrats	2	0	0
Independent	7	9	8
Vacant	0	2	15
Total	60		

Notes

1. The 2007 column refers to the state of parties when 23rd Seanad first met in 2007.
2. The November 2010 column refers to the state of parties on the dissolution of the 30th Dáil.
3. The March 2011 column refers to the state of parties after the 2011 Dáil election.

=== Graphical representation ===
This is a graphical comparison of party strengths in the 23rd Seanad in January 2011.

- Note: This was not the official seating plan.

== List of senators ==
- Note: The entries for Senators who were elected or appointed to fill vacancies are shown in italics

Name	Panel	Party	Notes
Mark Daly	Administrative Panel	Fianna Fáil	
Paschal Donohoe	Administrative Panel	Fine Gael	Elected to Dáil at the 2011 general election
Camillus Glynn	Administrative Panel	Fianna Fáil	
Tony Kett	Administrative Panel	Fianna Fáil	Died on 19 April 2009
Nicky McFadden	Administrative Panel	Fine Gael	Elected to Dáil at the 2011 general election
Brendan Ryan	Administrative Panel	Labour	Elected to Dáil at the 2011 general election
Diarmuid Wilson	Administrative Panel	Fianna Fáil	
James Carroll	Administrative Panel	Fianna Fáil	Elected to Seanad on 26 November 2009, replacing Tony Kett
Paul Bradford	Agricultural Panel	Fine Gael	
Paddy Burke	Agricultural Panel	Fine Gael	Leas-Chathaoirleach
Peter Callanan	Agricultural Panel	Fianna Fáil	Died on 11 October 2009
John Carty	Agricultural Panel	Fianna Fáil	
Pearse Doherty	Agricultural Panel	Sinn Féin	Elected to Dáil Éireann in a by-election on 26 November 2010
Alan Kelly	Agricultural Panel	Labour	Elected to the European Parliament on 7 June 2009
Pat Moylan	Agricultural Panel	Fianna Fáil	Cathaoirleach
Francis O'Brien	Agricultural Panel	Fianna Fáil	
John Paul Phelan	Agricultural Panel	Fine Gael	Elected to Dáil at the 2011 general election
Eugene Regan	Agricultural Panel	Fine Gael	
Jim Walsh	Agricultural Panel	Fianna Fáil	Resigned the Fianna Fáil party whip on 7 July 2010; Rejoined the Fianna Fáil parliamentary party on 23 November 2010
Niall Ó Brolcháin	Agricultural Panel	Green	Elected to Seanad in a by-election on 14 December 2009, replacing Alan Kelly
Paschal Mooney	Agricultural Panel	Fianna Fáil	Elected to Seanad in a by-election on 19 January 2010, replacing Peter Callanan
Cecilia Keaveney	Cultural and Educational Panel	Fianna Fáil	
Labhrás Ó Murchú	Cultural and Educational Panel	Fianna Fáil	Resigned the Fianna Fáil party whip on 7 July 2010; Rejoined the Fianna Fáil parliamentary party on 23 November 2010
Ann Ormonde	Cultural and Educational Panel	Fianna Fáil	
Liam Twomey	Cultural and Educational Panel	Fine Gael	Elected to Dáil at the 2011 general election
Alex White	Cultural and Educational Panel	Labour	Elected to Dáil at the 2011 general election
Larry Butler	Industrial and Commercial Panel	Fianna Fáil	Resigned the Fianna Fáil party whip on 5 June 2010
Paudie Coffey	Industrial and Commercial Panel	Fine Gael	Elected to Dáil at the 2011 general election
Paul Coghlan	Industrial and Commercial Panel	Fine Gael	
Dominic Hannigan	Industrial and Commercial Panel	Labour	Elected to Dáil at the 2011 general election
Marc MacSharry	Industrial and Commercial Panel	Fianna Fáil	
Denis O'Donovan	Industrial and Commercial Panel	Fianna Fáil	Lost the Fianna Fáil party whip on 25 June 2010; Rejoined the Fianna Fáil parliamentary party on 19 October 2010
Joe O'Reilly	Industrial and Commercial Panel	Fine Gael	Elected to Dáil at the 2011 general election
Kieran Phelan	Industrial and Commercial Panel	Fianna Fáil	Died on 26 May 2010
Mary White	Industrial and Commercial Panel	Fianna Fáil	
Jerry Buttimer	Labour Panel	Fine Gael	Elected to Dáil at the 2011 general election
Donie Cassidy	Labour Panel	Fianna Fáil	Leader of the Seanad
Maurice Cummins	Labour Panel	Fine Gael	
Geraldine Feeney	Labour Panel	Fianna Fáil	
Frances Fitzgerald	Labour Panel	Fine Gael	Elected to Dáil at the 2011 general election
John Hanafin	Labour Panel	Fianna Fáil	Resigned the Fianna Fáil party whip on 7 July 2010; Rejoined the Fianna Fáil parliamentary party on 23 November 2010
Fidelma Healy Eames	Labour Panel	Fine Gael	
Terry Leyden	Labour Panel	Fianna Fáil	
Michael McCarthy	Labour Panel	Labour	Elected to Dáil at the 2011 general election
Ned O'Sullivan	Labour Panel	Fianna Fáil	
Phil Prendergast	Labour Panel	Labour	
Rónán Mullen	National University of Ireland	Independent	
Joe O'Toole	National University of Ireland	Independent	
Feargal Quinn	National University of Ireland	Independent	
Ivana Bacik	Dublin University	Independent	Joined the Labour Party on 23 September 2009
David Norris	Dublin University	Independent	
Shane Ross	Dublin University	Independent	Elected to Dáil at the 2011 general election
Dan Boyle	Nominated by the Taoiseach	Green	
Martin Brady	Nominated by the Taoiseach	Fianna Fáil	
Ivor Callely	Nominated by the Taoiseach	Fianna Fáil	Resigned the Fianna Fáil party whip on 5 June 2010; Resigned from the Fianna Fáil party on 24 August 2010
Ciarán Cannon	Nominated by the Taoiseach	Progressive Democrats	Joined Fine Gael on 24 March 2009; Elected to Dáil at the 2011 general election
Maria Corrigan	Nominated by the Taoiseach	Fianna Fáil	
Déirdre de Búrca	Nominated by the Taoiseach	Green	Resigned from the Seanad on 12 February 2010
John Ellis	Nominated by the Taoiseach	Fianna Fáil	
Eoghan Harris	Nominated by the Taoiseach	Independent	
Lisa McDonald	Nominated by the Taoiseach	Fianna Fáil	
Brian Ó Domhnaill	Nominated by the Taoiseach	Fianna Fáil	
Fiona O'Malley	Nominated by the Taoiseach	Progressive Democrats	Sat as an independent on dissolution of the Progressive Democrats in December 2009
Mark Dearey	Nominated by the Taoiseach	Green	Appointed on 23 February 2010, replacing Déirdre de Búrca
Darragh O'Brien	Nominated by the Taoiseach	Fianna Fáil	Nominated on 4 March 2011 to fill vacancy

== Changes ==
Fourteen senators were elected to the 31st Dáil at the general election on 25 February 2011.

Date	Panel	Loss	Gain	Note
24 March 2009	Nominated by the Taoiseach	Progressive Democrats	Fine Gael	Ciarán Cannon joins Fine Gael
19 April 2009	Administrative Panel	Fianna Fáil		Death of Tony Kett
7 June 2009	Agricultural Panel	Labour		Alan Kelly elected to the European Parliament
23 September 2009	Dublin University	Independent	Labour	Ivana Bacik takes Labour Party whip
11 October 2009	Agricultural Panel	Fianna Fáil		Death of Peter Callanan
26 November 2009	Administrative Panel		Fianna Fáil	James Carroll elected unopposed, succeeding Tony Kett
11 December 2009	Nominated by the Taoiseach	Progressive Democrats	Independent	Fiona O'Malley becomes an independent on dissolution of the Progressive Democrats
14 December 2009	Agricultural Panel		Green	Niall Ó Brolcháin elected in a by-election, replacing Alan Kelly
19 January 2010	Agricultural Panel		Fianna Fáil	Paschal Mooney elected in a by-election, replacing Peter Callanan
12 February 2010	Nominated by the Taoiseach	Green		Déirdre de Búrca resigns from the Seanad
23 February 2010	Nominated by the Taoiseach		Green	Mark Dearey appointed, replacing Déirdre de Búrca
26 May 2010	Industrial and Commercial Panel	Fianna Fáil		Death of Kieran Phelan
5 June 2010	Industrial and Commercial Panel	Fianna Fáil	Independent	Larry Butler resigns the Fianna Fáil party whip
5 June 2010	Nominated by the Taoiseach	Fianna Fáil	Independent	Ivor Callely resigns the Fianna Fáil party whip
25 June 2010	Industrial and Commercial Panel	Fianna Fáil	Independent	Denis O'Donovan loses the Fianna Fáil party whip
7 July 2010	Labour Panel	Fianna Fáil	Independent	John Hanafin resigns the Fianna Fáil party whip in opposition to Civil Partnership and Certain Rights and Obligations of Cohabitants Bill
7 July 2010	Agricultural Panel	Fianna Fáil	Independent	Jim Walsh resigns the Fianna Fáil party whip in opposition to Civil Partnership and Certain Rights and Obligations of Cohabitants Bill
7 July 2010	Cultural and Educational Panel	Fianna Fáil	Independent	Labhrás Ó Murchú resigns the Fianna Fáil party whip in opposition to Civil Partnership and Certain Rights and Obligations of Cohabitants Bill
24 August 2010	Nominated by the Taoiseach			Ivor Callely resigns from the Fianna Fáil party after expenses controversy
19 October 2010	Industrial and Commercial Panel	Independent	Fianna Fáil	Denis O'Donovan rejoined the Fianna Fáil parliamentary party
23 November 2010	Agricultural Panel	Independent	Fianna Fáil	Jim Walsh rejoins the Fianna Fáil parliamentary party
23 November 2010	Labour Panel	Independent	Fianna Fáil	John Hanafin rejoins the Fianna Fáil parliamentary party
23 November 2010	Cultural and Educational Panel	Independent	Fianna Fáil	Labhrás Ó Murchú rejoins Fianna Fáil parliamentary party
26 November 2010	Agricultural Panel	Sinn Féin		Pearse Doherty elected to the 30th Dáil in a by-election
25 February 2011	Administrative Panel	Fine Gael		Paschal Donohoe elected to the 31st Dáil
25 February 2011	Administrative Panel	Fine Gael		Nicky McFadden elected to the 31st Dáil
25 February 2011	Administrative Panel	Labour		Brendan Ryan elected to the 31st Dáil
25 February 2011	Agricultural Panel	Fine Gael		John Paul Phelan elected to the 31st Dáil
25 February 2011	Cultural and Educational Panel	Fine Gael		Liam Twomey elected to the 31st Dáil
25 February 2011	Cultural and Educational Panel	Labour		Alex White elected to the 31st Dáil
25 February 2011	Industrial and Commercial Panel	Fine Gael		Paudie Coffey elected to the 31st Dáil
25 February 2011	Industrial and Commercial Panel	Labour		Dominic Hannigan elected to the 31st Dáil
25 February 2011	Industrial and Commercial Panel	Fine Gael		Joe O'Reilly elected to the 31st Dáil
25 February 2011	Labour Panel	Fine Gael		Jerry Buttimer elected to the 31st Dáil
25 February 2011	Labour Panel	Fine Gael		Frances Fitzgerald elected to the 31st Dáil
25 February 2011	Labour Panel	Labour		Michael McCarthy elected to the 31st Dáil
25 February 2011	Dublin University	Independent		Shane Ross elected to the 31st Dáil
25 February 2011	Nominated by the Taoiseach	Fine Gael		Ciarán Cannon elected to the 31st Dáil
4 March 2011	Nominated by the Taoiseach		Fianna Fáil	Darragh O'Brien nominated to fill vacancy
