= 21st Seanad =

Members of the Seanad from 1997 to 2002

←	20th Seanad	22nd Seanad	→

Overview
- Legislative body: Seanad Éireann
- Jurisdiction: Ireland
- Meeting place: Leinster House
- Term: 17 September 1997 – 26 June 2002
- Government: 25th government of Ireland
- Members: 60
- Cathaoirleach: Brian Mullooly (FF)
- Leas-Chathaoirleach: Liam T. Cosgrave (FG)
- Leader of the Seanad: Donie Cassidy (FF)

The 21st Seanad was in office from 1997 to 2002. An election to Seanad Éireann, the senate of the Oireachtas (Irish parliament), followed the 1997 general election to the 28th Dáil. The senators served until the close of poll for the 22nd Seanad at the end of July 2002.

== Cathaoirleach ==
On 17 September 1997, Brian Mullooly (FF) was proposed as Cathaoirleach by Donie Cassidy (FF) and seconded by Michael Finneran (FF). He was elected without a division.

On 18 September 1997, Liam T. Cosgrave (FG) was proposed as Leas-Chathaoirleach by Maurice Manning (FG) and seconded by Paddy Burke (FG). He was elected without a division.

== Composition of the 21st Seanad ==
There are a total of 60 seats in the Seanad. 43 Senators were elected on five vocational panels, 6 were elected from two university constituencies and 11 are nominated by the Taoiseach.

The following table shows the composition by party when the 21st Seanad first met on 17 September 1997.

Origin Party	Vocational panels					NUI	DU	Nominated	Total
Origin Party	Admin	Agri	Cult & Educ	Ind & Comm	Labour	NUI	DU	Nominated	Total
Fianna Fáil	3	6	3	5	6	0	0	6	29
Fine Gael	3	4	2	3	4	0	0	0	16
Labour Party	1	1	0	1	1	0	0	0	4
Progressive Democrats	0	0	0	0	0	0	0	4	4
Independent	0	0	0	0	0	3	3	1	7
Total	7	11	5	9	11	3	3	11	60

== List of senators ==
- Note: The entries for Senators who were elected or appointed to fill vacancies are shown in italics

Name	Panel	Party	Notes
Fintan Coogan	Administrative Panel	Fine Gael	
Joe Costello	Administrative Panel	Labour	Elected to Dáil at the 2002 general election
Joe Doyle	Administrative Panel	Fine Gael	
Michael Finneran	Administrative Panel	Fianna Fáil	Elected to Dáil at the 2002 general election
Camillus Glynn	Administrative Panel	Fianna Fáil	
Tony Kett	Administrative Panel	Fianna Fáil	
Fergus O'Dowd	Administrative Panel	Fine Gael	Elected to Dáil at the 2002 general election
Paddy Burke	Agricultural Panel	Fine Gael	
Peter Callanan	Agricultural Panel	Fianna Fáil	
John Connor	Agricultural Panel	Fine Gael	
Avril Doyle	Agricultural Panel	Fine Gael	
Tom Hayes	Agricultural Panel	Fine Gael	Elected to Dáil at the Tipperary South by-election on 30 June 2001
Rory Kiely	Agricultural Panel	Fianna Fáil	
Patrick McGowan	Agricultural Panel	Fianna Fáil	Died on 3 October 1999
Pat Moylan	Agricultural Panel	Fianna Fáil	
Francis O'Brien	Agricultural Panel	Fianna Fáil	
Kathleen O'Meara	Agricultural Panel	Labour	
Jim Walsh	Agricultural Panel	Fianna Fáil	
Seán Ó Fearghaíl	Agricultural Panel	Fianna Fáil	Elected to Seanad in a by-election on 2 June 2000; Elected to Dáil at the 2002 general election
M. J. Nolan	Agricultural Panel	Fianna Fáil	Elected to the Seanad at a by-election on 18 December 2001; Elected to Dáil at the 2002 general election
Maurice Manning	Cultural and Educational Panel	Fine Gael	
Paschal Mooney	Cultural and Educational Panel	Fianna Fáil	
Labhrás Ó Murchú	Cultural and Educational Panel	Fianna Fáil	
Ann Ormonde	Cultural and Educational Panel	Fianna Fáil	
Madeleine Taylor-Quinn	Cultural and Educational Panel	Fine Gael	
Eddie Bohan	Industrial and Commercial Panel	Fianna Fáil	
Ernie Caffrey	Industrial and Commercial Panel	Fine Gael	
Paul Coghlan	Industrial and Commercial Panel	Fine Gael	
Liam T. Cosgrave	Industrial and Commercial Panel	Fine Gael	
Margaret Cox	Industrial and Commercial Panel	Fianna Fáil	
Willie Farrell	Industrial and Commercial Panel	Fianna Fáil	
Pat Gallagher	Industrial and Commercial Panel	Labour	Resigned from the Seanad on 12 October 1999
Jim Glennon	Industrial and Commercial Panel	Fianna Fáil	Elected to the Seanad at a by-election on 2 June 2000; Elected to Dáil at the 2002 general election
Mick Lanigan	Industrial and Commercial Panel	Fianna Fáil	
Denis O'Donovan	Industrial and Commercial Panel	Fianna Fáil	Elected to Dáil at the 2002 general election
Donie Cassidy	Labour Panel	Fianna Fáil	Elected to Dáil at the 2002 general election
Denis Cregan	Labour Panel	Fine Gael	
Liam Fitzgerald	Labour Panel	Fianna Fáil	
Des Hanafin	Labour Panel	Fianna Fáil	
Mary Jackman	Labour Panel	Fine Gael	
Dan Kiely	Labour Panel	Fianna Fáil	
Don Lydon	Labour Panel	Fianna Fáil	
Jarlath McDonagh	Labour Panel	Fine Gael	
Brian Mullooly	Labour Panel	Fianna Fáil	
Therese Ridge	Labour Panel	Fine Gael	
Seán Ryan	Labour Panel	Labour	Elected to the Dáil at the Dublin North by-election on 11 March 1998
John Cregan	Labour Panel	Fianna Fáil	Elected to the Seanad at a by-election on 23 June 1998; Elected to Dáil at the 2002 general election
Joe O'Toole	National University of Ireland	Independent	
Feargal Quinn	National University of Ireland	Independent	
Brendan Ryan	National University of Ireland	Independent	Joined the Labour Party on 14 January 1999
Mary Henry	Dublin University	Independent	
David Norris	Dublin University	Independent	
Shane Ross	Dublin University	Independent	
Enda Bonner	Nominated by the Taoiseach	Fianna Fáil	
Frank Chambers	Nominated by the Taoiseach	Fianna Fáil	
John Dardis	Nominated by the Taoiseach	Progressive Democrats	
Tom Fitzgerald	Nominated by the Taoiseach	Fianna Fáil	Resigned from Seanad on 4 April 2002
Dermot Fitzpatrick	Nominated by the Taoiseach	Fianna Fáil	Elected to Dáil at the 2002 general election
Jim Gibbons	Nominated by the Taoiseach	Progressive Democrats	
Edward Haughey	Nominated by the Taoiseach	Fianna Fáil	
Maurice Hayes	Nominated by the Taoiseach	Independent	
Helen Keogh	Nominated by the Taoiseach	Progressive Democrats	Changed from Progressive Democrats to Fine Gael on 14 June 2000
Ann Leonard	Nominated by the Taoiseach	Fianna Fáil	
Máirín Quill	Nominated by the Taoiseach	Progressive Democrats	
Martin Mackin	Nominated by the Taoiseach	Fianna Fáil	Nominated on 22 May 2002 to fill vacancy
Mary O'Rourke	Nominated by the Taoiseach	Fianna Fáil	Nominated on 22 May 2002 to fill vacancy

== Changes ==
Date	Panel	Loss	Gain	Note
11 March 1998	Labour Panel	Labour		Seán Ryan elected to the 28th Dáil at the Dublin North by-election
23 June 1998	Labour Panel		Fianna Fáil	John Cregan elected to the Seanad at a by-election
14 January 1999	National University	Independent	Labour	Brendan Ryan joined the Labour Party
3 October 1999	Agricultural Panel	Fianna Fáil		Death of Patrick McGowan
12 October 1999	Industrial and Commercial Panel	Labour		Pat Gallagher resigned from the Seanad to take up position on Westmeath County Council.
9 June 2000	Industrial and Commercial Panel		Fianna Fáil	Jim Glennon elected to the Seanad at a by-election
9 June 2000	Agricultural Panel		Fianna Fáil	Seán Ó Fearghaíl elected to Seanad in a by-election
14 June 2000	Nominated by the Taoiseach	Progressive Democrats	Fine Gael	Helen Keogh joined Fine Gael
30 June 2001	Agricultural Panel	Fine Gael		Tom Hayes elected to 28th Dáil at the Tipperary South by-election
December 2001	Agricultural Panel		Fianna Fáil	M. J. Nolan elected to the Seanad at a by-election
4 April 2002	Nominated by the Taoiseach	Fianna Fáil		Tom Fitzgerald resigned from the Seanad
17 May 2002	Labour Panel	Fianna Fáil		Donie Cassidy elected to the 29th Dáil at the 2002 general election
17 May 2002	Administrative Panel	Labour		Joe Costello elected to the 29th Dáil at the 2002 general election
17 May 2002	Labour Panel	Fianna Fáil		John Cregan elected to the 29th Dáil at the 2002 general election
17 May 2002	Administrative Panel	Fianna Fáil		Michael Finneran elected to 29th Dáil at the 2002 general election
17 May 2002	Nominated by the Taoiseach	Fianna Fáil		Dermot Fitzpatrick elected to the 29th Dáil at the 2002 general election
17 May 2002	Industrial and Commercial Panel	Fianna Fáil		Jim Glennon elected to the 29th Dáil at the 2002 general election
17 May 2002	Agricultural Panel	Fianna Fáil		M. J. Nolan elected to the 29th Dáil at the 2002 general election
17 May 2002	Industrial and Commercial Panel	Fianna Fáil		Denis O'Donovan elected to the 29th Dáil at the 2002 general election
17 May 2002	Administrative Panel	Fine Gael		Fergus O'Dowd elected to the 29th Dáil at the 2002 general election
17 May 2002	Agricultural Panel	Fianna Fáil		Seán Ó Fearghaíl elected to the 29th Dáil at the 2002 general election
22 May 2002	Nominated by the Taoiseach		Fianna Fáil	Mary O'Rourke nominated to fill vacancy
22 May 2002	Nominated by the Taoiseach		Fianna Fáil	Martin Mackin nominated to fill vacancy
