= Larry Butler =

Larry Butler may refer to:

- Larry Butler (producer) (1942–2012), American country music producer and songwriter
- Larry Butler (Canadian football) (born 1952), American player of Canadian football
- Larry Butler (darts player) (born 1957), American darts player
- Larry Butler (Irish politician), Irish Fianna Fáil politician
- Larry Butler (Connecticut politician), member of the Connecticut House of Representatives

== See also ==
- Lawrence Butler (disambiguation)
