= Comhaltas Ceoltóirí Éireann =

Irish musical organisation

Coordinates: 53°17′43.5″N 6°9′44″W

- Formation: 1951
- Type: Music organisation, purpose: Primarily the managing and promotion of Irish music and dance, also the promotion of Irish culture in general and the language.
- Headquarters: Cultúrlann na hÉireann, Monkstown, Dublin
- Region served: Worldwide
- Official language: Irish language
- President: Attracta Ní Bhrádaigh
- Director General: Labhrás Ó Murchú
- Staff: Limited full time staff
- Website: https://comhaltas.ie/

Comhaltas Ceoltóirí Éireann (Irish pronunciation: [ˈkoːl̪ˠt̪ˠəsˠ ˈcoːl̪ˠt̪ˠoːɾʲiː ˈeːɾʲən̪ˠ]; meaning "Society of the musicians of Ireland") is the primary Irish organisation dedicated to the promotion of the music, song, dance and the language of Ireland. The organisation was founded in 1951 and has promoted Irish music and culture among the Irish people and the Irish diaspora.

Its current Ardstiúrthóir (Director General) is Labhrás Ó Murchú and its Uachtarán (president) is Attracta Ní Bhrádaigh. It has more than 400 branches worldwide with tens of thousands of members, in Ireland, the United Kingdom, the United States of America, Canada, Mexico, France, Spain, Germany, Hungary, Luxembourg, Russia, Australia and New Zealand.

== History ==
Comhaltas was founded in 1951 in Mullingar, County Westmeath by a group of traditional musicians and other Gaelic culture advocates from around Ireland, seeking to improve the standing of traditional Irish music, dance and language in Ireland. The first Fleadh Cheoil was held in Mullingar in 1951. The organisation was initially named Cumann Ceoltóirí na hÉireann, changing to its present name in 1952.

== Comhaltas around the World ==
=== Great Britain ===
Six years after the creation of Comhaltas Ceoltóirí Éireann, in 1957, Comhaltas na Breataine or Comhaltas in Britain was established. The first branch outside of Ireland was based in Glasgow where a many Irish immigrants settled during the 50s and 60s. As of 2024, it now hosts over 24 branches across England, Scotland and Wales.

== Centres ==
- Áras an Mhuilinn, Mullingar.
- Brú Ború, Cashel.
- Brú na Sí, Youghal.
- Clasaċ, Clontarf.
- Cnoc na Gaoithe, Tulla.
- Cois na hAbhna, Ennis.
- Cultúrlann na hÉireann, Headquarters, Monkstown.
- Dún Uladh, Omagh.
- Dún na Sí, Moate.
- Kilrush Regional Outreach Centre.
- Meitheal an Íarthar/Ceoláras Coleman/Regional Resource Centre, Gurteen.
- Morrison Teach Cheoil, Riverstown.
- Oriel Centre (Dundalk Gaol).

== Activities ==
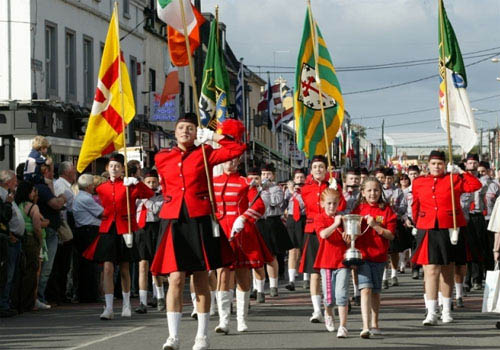
Opening of Fleadh Cheoil na hÉireann 2008 in Tullamore

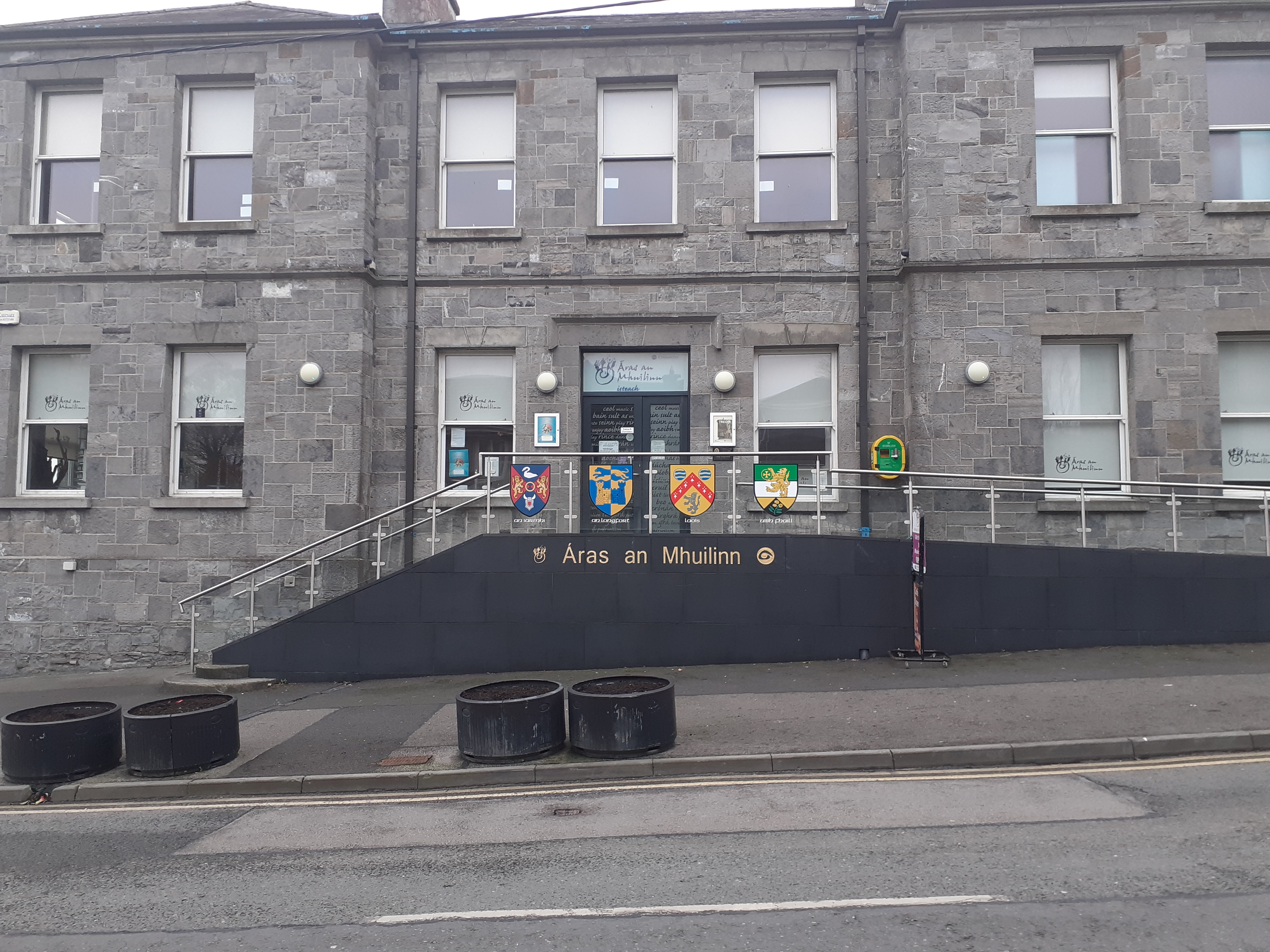
Áras an Mhuilinn, one of the Comhaltas centres in Ireland. Comhaltas was established in Mullingar in 1951.

Comhaltas is responsible for organising the annual national Irish music festival and competition called the Fleadh Cheoil.

Comhaltas has published a magazine called Treoir relating to Irish traditional music since 1970.

== See also ==
- Music of Ireland
- Uilleann pipes
- Irish language
- Fleadh Cheoil
