= Martin Mackin =

Irish politician

Senator
- In office 22 May 2002 – 12 September 2002
- Constituency: Nominated by the Taoiseach

Personal details
- Political party: Fianna Fáil

Martin Mackin is an Irish former Fianna Fáil politician who served briefly as a senator for the final weeks of the 21st Seanad in 2002, when he was nominated by the Taoiseach, Bertie Ahern to fill one of the vacancies caused by the election of a nominated senator to Dáil Éireann. He is a former press secretary for the Fianna Fáil party and was General Secretary of the party from 1998 until 2003.
