= Lawrence Butler =

Lawrence Butler may refer to:

- Lawrence W. Butler (1908–1988), American special effects designer
- Lawrence Butler (archaeologist) (1934–2014), English archaeologist
- Lawrence E. Butler (born 1953), American diplomat
- Lawrence Butler (basketball) (1957–2018), American basketball player
- Lawrence Butler (baseball) (born 2000), American baseball player

== See also ==
- Larry Butler (disambiguation)
