= Zappone v. Revenue Commissioners =

Irish LGTBQ legal case

- Court: High Court of Ireland
- Full case name: Katherine Zappone and Ann Louise Gilligan, Plaintiffs v. The Revenue Commissioners, Ireland and The Attorney General, Defendants, and The Human Rights Commission, Notice Party
- Decided: 14 December 2006
- Citation: [2006] IEHC 404, [2008] 2 IR 417

Court membership
- Judge sitting: Dunne J

Keywords
- Same-sex marriage; Recognition of Marriage; Constitution of Ireland; Taxation

Zappone & Gilligan v. Revenue Commissioners & Ors [2006] IEHC 404 (also known as the KAL Case) was a High Court case which was one of the first major events in the debate on the recognition of same-sex marriage in Ireland. The plaintiffs Ann Louise Gilligan and Katherine Zappone unsuccessfully sought recognition of their Canadian marriage.

The case helped prompt the Civil Partnership and Certain Rights and Obligations of Cohabitants Act 2010, as well as the Thirty-fourth Amendment of the Constitution of Ireland which allowed for the Marriage Act 2015, which legalised same-sex marriage in the Republic of Ireland.

== Case ==
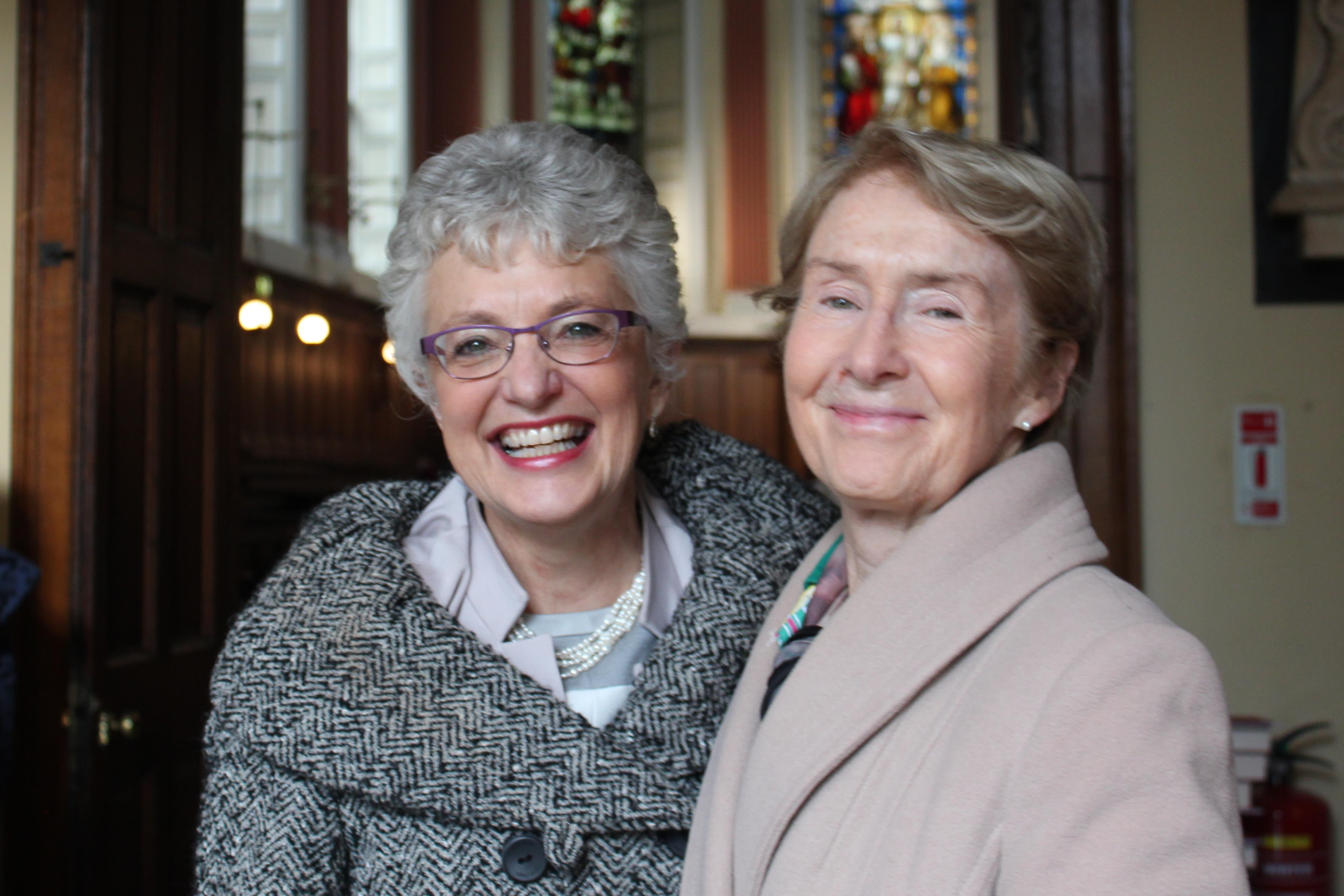
Katherine Zappone and Ann Louise Gilligan at a service in the chapel of Trinity College Dublin on 16 November 2014.

In November 2004, lesbian couple Katherine Zappone and Ann Louise Gilligan (K & AL) were granted leave by the High Court to pursue a claim to have their September 2003 Vancouver marriage recognised for the filing of joint tax returns in Ireland. Mr. Justice Liam McKechnie remarked that the case was significant and would embrace far-reaching issues touching many aspects of society. Lead barrister, Gerard Hogan, argued that neither the 1937 Irish constitution nor more recent tax laws specifically define marriage as between one man and one woman. Following a delay, the Government announced in April 2005 that it would contest the case on the basis of advice from the Attorney General that it would prevail. The case attracted media coverage in The Boston Globe and the couple were interviewed on The Late Late Show. Writing about the beginning of the case, Ciara Dwyer of the Irish Independent wrote "They were shocked that all they had saved for could go down the drain. When they first contacted the Revenue with queries, the tax officials were confused by their status. Yes, they were married – but of the same sex. The pair thought it was time to fight for their case. 'Out-fucking-rageous', says Katherine."

The couple were represented by Michael M. Collins, SC, Gerard Hogan, SC (later appointed to the High Court in 2010 and to the Court of Appeal in 2014), and Ivana Bacik (later elected to Seanad Éireann in 2007).

The case was heard from 3 to 13 October 2006 and the judgment was delivered on 14 December 2006. Ms. Justice Dunne found that although a "living document", the Constitution of Ireland had always meant for marriage to be between a man and a woman, that the definitions used in the Civil Registration Act of 2004 was an expression of the current attitudes of the state and that she could find no reason to change that. Further, she found that the constitution did not violate the plaintiffs' rights under European law. The judgment did say, however, that the topic is very much in the news and that there were undoubtedly difficulties and hardships for same-sex and unmarried heterosexual couples and, "It is to be hoped that the legislative changes to ameliorate these difficulties will not be long in coming. Ultimately, it is for the legislature to determine the extent to which such changes should be made". Dunne J did not explicitly find that same-sex marriage would be unconstitutional.

On 23 February 2007, the case was appealed to the Supreme Court. The case came before the Supreme Court in 2012, although returned to the High Court to challenge different elements of law, specifically the Civil Registration Act of 2004 and Civil Partnership Act of 2010.

== Later developments ==
In 2008, the couple published a joint memoir, Our Lives Out Loud: In Pursuit of Justice and Equality, which detailed the background to the case. Its foreword was written by Archbishop Desmond Tutu.

The Civil Partnership and Certain Rights and Obligations of Cohabitants Act 2010 allowed same-sex couples to enter civil partnerships. Katherine Zappone was nominated by the Taoiseach as a Senator for the term beginning in 2011.

The Thirty-fourth Amendment of the Constitution of Ireland was passed by referendum on 22 May 2015 which allowed marriage to be contracted without distinction as to sex. This was brought into effect by the Marriage Act 2015. Katherine Zappone and Ann Louse Gilligan renewed their marriage vows at a ceremony in Dublin City Hall on 22 January 2016. President of Ireland, Michael D. Higgins, along with other Irish politicians, attended the ceremony.

At the 2016 general election, Zappone was elected as a TD for Dublin South-West and was appointed by Taoiseach Enda Kenny as Minister for Children and Youth Affairs.

Ann Louise Gilligan died in June 2017.
