= Labhrás Ó Murchú =

Irish politician & director of the traditional Irish music society

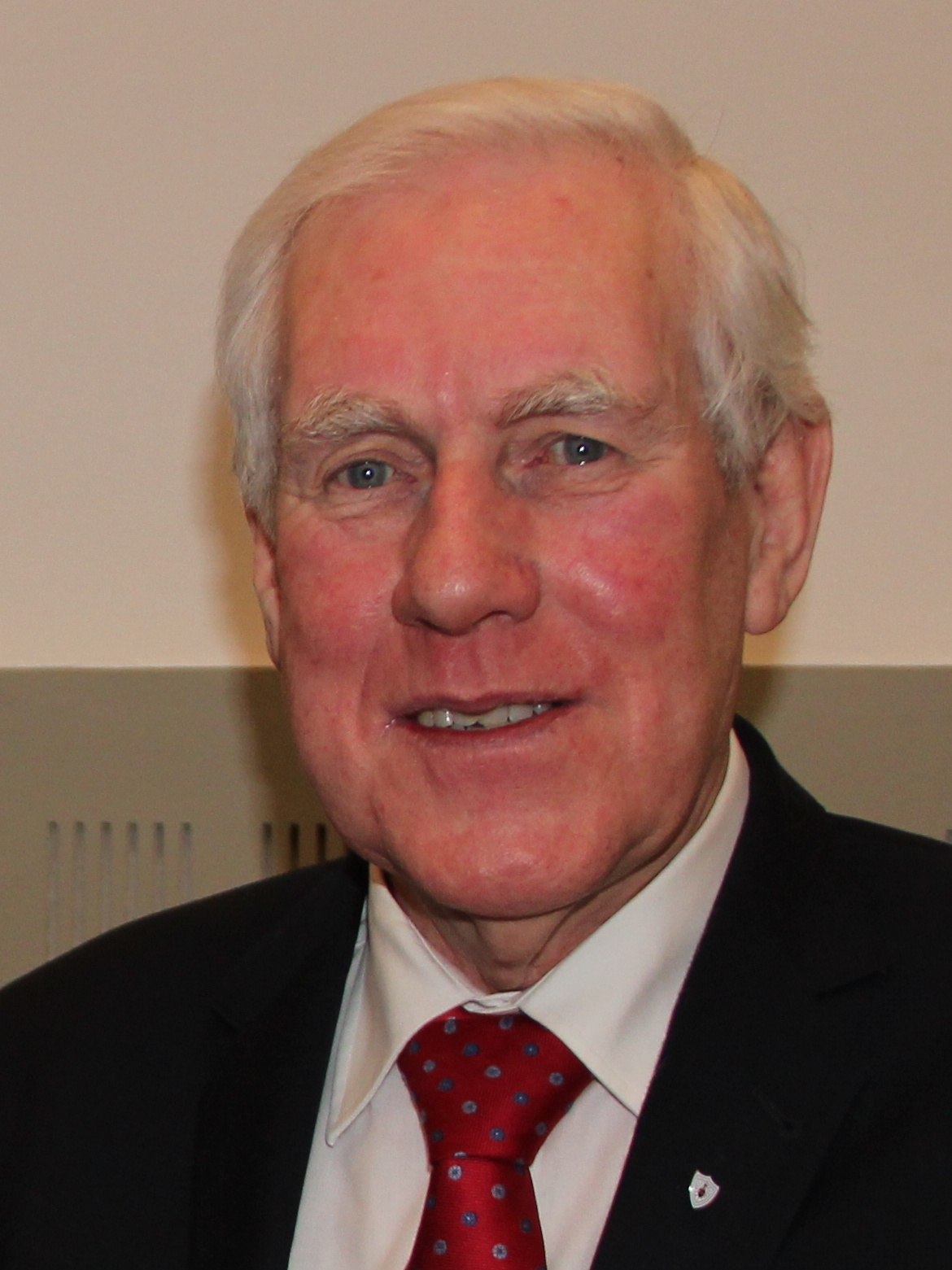
- Ó Murchú in 2014

Senator
- In office 17 September 1997 – 8 June 2016
- Constituency: Cultural and Educational Panel

Personal details
- Born: 14 August 1939 (age 86) Cashel, County Tipperary, Ireland
- Party: Fianna Fáil

Labhrás Ó Murchú (pronounced [ˈl̪ˠəuɾˠaːsˠ oː ˈmˠʊɾˠəxuː]; born 14 August 1939) is the Director-General of Comhaltas Ceoltóirí Éireann, and a retired member of Seanad Éireann for Fianna Fáil.

Ó Murchú was born in Cashel, County Tipperary. He was a candidate in 1993 for election to the 20th Seanad by the Cultural and Educational Panel, but was unsuccessful. In 1996 the Lord Mayor of Dublin, Seán Dublin Bay Rockall Loftus, awarded him the Dublin City Lord Mayor's Award, in recognition of his many achievements in cultural and social work.

He stood again for election to Seanad Éireann in 1997, nominated by Comhaltas rather than by Fianna Fáil, and was elected to the 21st Seanad. He was re-elected in 2002 to the 22nd Seanad and in 2007 to the 23rd Seanad.

In June 2010, Ó Murchú admitted that he stayed in CCE headquarters for €50 a night bed and breakfast while attending Leinster House, but claimed a €126 overnight allowance. On 7 July 2010 he resigned the Fianna Fáil parliamentary party whip, along with John Hanafin and Jim Walsh, in protest at the Civil Partnership bill. He rejoined the Fianna Fáil parliamentary party on 23 November 2010.

He was re-elected to the 24th Seanad in 2011, despite pressure on him to resign in order to make way for newer Fianna Fáil candidates; this was a strategy devised by party leader Micheál Martin in an attempt to recover from the party's disastrous result at the 2011 general election. Ó Murchú's re-election was credited to support from Sinn Féin voters who had not contested the panel.

On 15 September 2011, at a meeting of the Fianna Fáil parliamentary party, the issue of the 2011 presidential election was raised. Unexpectedly, Ó Murchú sought to run as an independent candidate. This was widely seen as a challenge to the authority of Micheál Martin. The extended meeting broke up without agreement. The parliamentary party met again on 20 September. Ó Murchú withdrew his request for a nomination and a motion was passed that the party's Oireachtas members would not nominate or endorse any candidate.

In 2012, Ó Murchú was listed as having the worst attendance record of any Senator, having missed 19 of 61 votes. The Irish Independent newspaper later published an apology, because Ó Murchú's absence was owing to his wife's illness while on a business trip to the United States of America.

He was the Fianna Fáil Seanad spokesperson on Arts, Heritage and Gaeltacht Affairs.
