= Paddy Burke =

Irish former politician (born 1955)

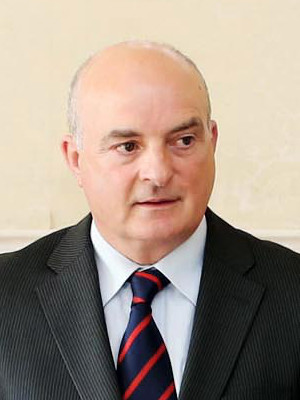
- Burke in 2014

Cathaoirleach of Seanad Éireann
- In office 25 May 2011 – 8 June 2016
- Preceded by: Pat Moylan
- Succeeded by: Denis O'Donovan

Leas-Chathaoirleach of Seanad Éireann
- In office 13 September 2002 – 25 May 2011
- Cathaoirleach: Rory Kiely; Pat Moylan
- Preceded by: Liam T. Cosgrave
- Succeeded by: Denis O'Donovan

Senator
- In office 17 February 1993 – 31 January 2025
- Constituency: Agricultural Panel

Personal details
- Born: Patrick Burke; 15 January 1955 (age 71) Castlebar, County Mayo, Ireland
- Party: Fine Gael
- Spouse: Dolores Burke (m. 1988)
- Education: Dublin City University

Patrick Burke (born 15 January 1955) is an Irish former Fine Gael politician who served as a Senator for the Agricultural Panel from 1993 to 2025. He previously served as Cathaoirleach of Seanad Éireann from 2011 to 2016 and Leas-Chathaoirleach of Seanad Éireann from 2002 to 2011.

Burke was a member of Mayo County Council from 1979 until the abolition of the dual mandate in 2003. He was first elected to the Oireachtas in the 1993 election to the 20th Seanad as a Senator for the Agricultural Panel, which also returned him to the 21st Seanad in 1997 and to the 22nd Seanad in 2002. In September 2002, Burke was elected as Leas-Chathaoirleach (deputy chairperson) of the Seanad, and after his re-election in 2007 to the 23rd Seanad he was re-elected as Leas Cathaoirleach.

He was elected as the Cathaoirleach of the 24th Seanad on 25 May 2011.

Following his involvement in the Oireachtas Golf Society scandal ("Golfgate") in August 2020, Burke was one of six senators who lost the party whip in the Senate as punishment for their actions. The party unanimously voted to restore the whip to Burke in January 2021.

Burke did not contest the 2025 Seanad election.

Oireachtas
Preceded by Pat Moylan	Cathaoirleach of Seanad Éireann; 2011–2016	Succeeded by Denis O'Donovan
