= John Hanafin =

Irish former politician (born 1960)

- Hanafin in 2009

Senator
- In office 12 September 2002 – 25 May 2011
- Constituency: Labour Panel

Personal details
- Born: 27 September 1960 (age 66)
- Party: Fianna Fáil
- Spouse: Linda Hanafin (div.)
- Children: 3
- Parent: Des Hanafin (father)
- Relatives: Mary Hanafin (sister)
- Education: University College Dublin
- Profession: Barrister

John Gerard Hanafin (born 27 September 1960) is an Irish former Fianna Fáil politician, who was a member of Seanad Éireann from 2002 to 2011. He was elected by the Labour Panel. Hanafin is the brother of the former cabinet minister Mary Hanafin and the son of the former Senator, Des Hanafin. He was first elected to the Seanad in 2002 and re-elected in 2007. He was a member of North Tipperary County Council representing the Thurles area from 1988 to 2003.

He called for a yes vote in unsuccessful 2002 abortion referendum, which would have rolled back the X Case.

On 7 July 2010, he resigned the Fianna Fáil parliamentary party whip, along with Labhrás Ó Murchú and Jim Walsh, in protest at the Civil Partnership and Certain Rights and Obligations of Cohabitants Act 2010 which gave some legal recognition to same-sex couples. He rejoined the Fianna Fáil parliamentary party on 23 November 2010.

He favours the gold standard.

Hanafin lost his seat at the 2011 Seanad election. He was nominated to the Industrial and Commercial Panel for the 2016 Seanad elections but was unsuccessful in regaining a Seanad seat.

In September 2015, Hanafin was appointed as Honorary Consul to the Russian Federation in Thurles, County Tipperary. He resigned as Honorary Consul of the Russian Federation over the invasion of Ukraine. He stated no conflict is worth a human life and called for an immediate cessation of the conflict and peace talks.

At the Fianna Fáil Árd Fheis in 2017, Hanafin advocated again for retention of the 8th Amendment, linking abortion to a lack of supply of babies for adoption.

In November 2017, Hanafin entered talks with serving politicians about establishing a rural, anti-abortion political party.

He was an unsuccessful Fianna Fáil candidate at the 2020 Seanad election.

He was called to the Bar of Ireland in 2019.

== See also ==
- Families in the Oireachtas
