= Ciarán Cannon =

Irish former politician (born 1965)

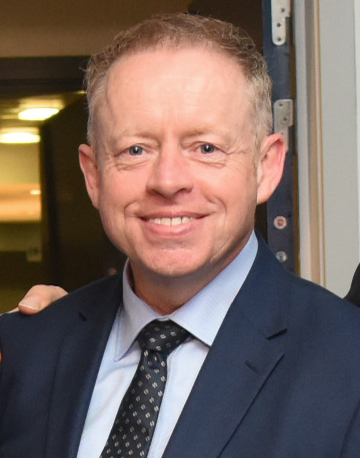
- Cannon in 2018

Minister of State
- 2017–2020: Foreign Affairs and Trade
- 2011–2014: Education and Skills

Teachta Dála
- In office February 2011 – November 2024
- Constituency: Galway East

Senator
- In office 13 September 2007 – 25 February 2011
- Constituency: Nominated by the Taoiseach

Leader of the Progressive Democrats
- In office 17 April 2008 – March 2009
- Preceded by: Mary Harney
- Succeeded by: Office Abolished

Personal details
- Born: 19 September 1965 (age 61) Galway, Ireland
- Party: Fine Gael (since 2009); Progressive Democrats (until 2009)
- Spouse: Niamh Lawless (m. 1990)
- Children: 1
- Education: Trinity College Dublin

Ciarán Cannon (born 19 September 1965) is an Irish former Fine Gael politician who served as a Teachta Dála (TD) for the Galway East constituency from 2011 to 2024. He previously served as a senator for the Progressive Democrats and was the last elected leader of that party. He served as a Minister of State from 2011 to 2014 and again from 2017 to 2020. He served as a Senator from 2007 to 2011, after being nominated by the Taoiseach.

Before entering politics, he was a planning official for Galway City Council and Dublin City Council, as well as CEO and secretary of the Irish Pilgrimage Trust. In 2002, he was honoured as one of the Galway People of the Year.

== Political career ==
=== Progressive Democrats ===
As a member of the Progressive Democrats, Cannon was elected to Galway County Council in 2004, to represent the Loughrea local electoral area, with 1,307 first preferences. He was an unsuccessful candidate at the 2007 general election in Galway East. He was nominated by the Taoiseach Bertie Ahern to the 23rd Seanad in 2007.

Cannon was elected as Leader of the Progressive Democrats in April 2008. He was the first leader of the party to sit as a Senator while serving as leader. At his first press conference as party leader, he stated that he believed "there was passion, commitment, talent and knowledge within the PDs' ranks to stage a big comeback".

However, after speculation increased that Noel Grealish, one of the two Progressive Democrat TDs, intended to leave the party, Cannon announced in September 2008 that a party conference would be held on 8 November 2008, at which he would recommend that the party disband. The delegates present at the conference voted by 201–161 to agree with this recommendation.

=== Fine Gael ===
On 24 March 2009, Cannon announced his decision to resign the leadership of the PDs and joined Fine Gael the same day. At the 2011 general election, he was one of two Fine Gael TDs elected in Galway East.

On 10 March 2011, he was appointed by the coalition government led by Enda Kenny as Minister of State at the Department of Education and Skills with responsibility for Training and Skills. He was dropped as a minister in a reshuffle on 15 July 2014. At the 2016 general election, he was elected to the third seat in Galway East.

On 20 June 2017, he was appointed by the minority government led by Leo Varadkar as Minister of State at the Department of Foreign Affairs and Trade with responsibility for the Diaspora and International Development.

He called for a "No" vote in the 2018 referendum to allow legislation on abortion.

In 2019, in recognition of his work in education, Cannon was appointed as a UNICEF global champion for education. He is one of seven Generation Unlimited Champions who will advocate worldwide for the development of UNICEF's Gen U programme.

At the 2020 general election, he was elected to the second seat in Galway East. He continued to serve as a minister of state until the formation of a new government on 27 June 2020.

On 19 March 2024, Cannon announced that he would not contest the next general election, blaming a "toxicity in politics".

== Personal life ==
Cannon is a musician and songwriter, and recently collaborated with Irish folk singer Seán Keane and others on songwriting projects. One of Cannon's co-compositions, "Nature's Little Symphony", was performed in Dublin by the RTÉ Concert Orchestra as part of the national Cruinniú celebrations on Easter Monday 2017. Both "Nature’s Little Symphony" and another of his compositions "Gratitude" featured on the album "Gratitude" recorded by Seán Keane and the RTÉ Concert Orchestra in 2018. On the 10 August 2018, Cannon played piano with Seán Keane and the RTÉ Concert Orchestra as part of a sold-out performance at the National Concert Hall. In 2019, he composed "An Túr", a short piano instrumental to celebrate the birthday of W. B. Yeats.

In 2021 he was commissioned to compose the soundtrack to a poem by Emily Cullen as part of the national commemoration of the signing of the Anglo-Irish treaty in 1921.

In March 2024 he began presenting The Grey Lake Cafe, a radio show on Loughrea Community Radio featuring his own musical choices, and interviews with public figures who have a passion for music.

Cannon is also an avid cyclist and cycling safety advocate. He specialises in endurance cycling challenges and on 19 June 2021 he cycled Ireland end to end, a distance of 575 km, in 23 hours and 23 minutes, to raise money for charity.

On 2 July 2021 he was involved in a road traffic collision and suffered serious injuries. On 2 July 2022 he marked the first anniversary of the incident by cycling 500 km around the border of County Galway.

Marking the same date in 2023, he cycled 935 km (581 mi) in 56 hours, covering all 32 counties of the island of Ireland while fundraising for Hand In Hand, a charity that supports families challenged by childhood cancer.

He was elected as President of Cycling Ireland in May 2025.

Party political offices
Preceded by Mary Harney	Leader of the Progressive Democrats; 2008–2009	Succeeded by Noel Grealish (Interim)

Dáil	Election	Deputy (Party)	Deputy (Party)	Deputy (Party)	Deputy (Party)
9th	1937	Frank Fahy (FF)	Mark Killilea Snr (FF)	Patrick Beegan (FF)	Seán Broderick (FG)
10th	1938	Frank Fahy (FF)	Mark Killilea Snr (FF)	Patrick Beegan (FF)	Seán Broderick (FG)
11th	1943	Frank Fahy (FF)	Mark Killilea Snr (FF)	Patrick Beegan (FF)	Michael Donnellan (CnaT)
12th	1944	Frank Fahy (FF)	Mark Killilea Snr (FF)	Patrick Beegan (FF)	Michael Donnellan (CnaT)
13th	1948	Constituency abolished. See Galway North and Galway South			

Dáil	Election	Deputy (Party)	Deputy (Party)	Deputy (Party)	Deputy (Party)	Deputy (Party)
17th	1961	Michael F. Kitt (FF)	Anthony Millar (FF)	Michael Carty (FF)	Michael Donnellan (CnaT)	Brigid Hogan-O'Higgins (FG)
17th	1964 by-election	Michael F. Kitt (FF)	Anthony Millar (FF)	Michael Carty (FF)	John Donnellan (FG)	Brigid Hogan-O'Higgins (FG)
18th	1965	Michael F. Kitt (FF)	Anthony Millar (FF)	Michael Carty (FF)	John Donnellan (FG)	Brigid Hogan-O'Higgins (FG)
19th	1969	Constituency abolished. See Galway North-East and Clare–South Galway				

Dáil	Election	Deputy (Party)	Deputy (Party)	Deputy (Party)	Deputy (Party)
21st	1977	Johnny Callanan (FF)	Thomas Hussey (FF)	Mark Killilea Jnr (FF)	John Donnellan (FG)
22nd	1981	Johnny Callanan (FF)	Michael P. Kitt (FF)	Paul Connaughton Snr (FG)	3 seats 1981–1997
23rd	1982 (Feb)	Johnny Callanan (FF)	Michael P. Kitt (FF)	Paul Connaughton Snr (FG)	3 seats 1981–1997
23rd	1982 by-election	Noel Treacy (FF)	Michael P. Kitt (FF)	Paul Connaughton Snr (FG)	3 seats 1981–1997
24th	1982 (Nov)	Noel Treacy (FF)	Michael P. Kitt (FF)	Paul Connaughton Snr (FG)	3 seats 1981–1997
25th	1987	Noel Treacy (FF)	Michael P. Kitt (FF)	Paul Connaughton Snr (FG)	3 seats 1981–1997
26th	1989	Noel Treacy (FF)	Michael P. Kitt (FF)	Paul Connaughton Snr (FG)	3 seats 1981–1997
27th	1992	Noel Treacy (FF)	Michael P. Kitt (FF)	Paul Connaughton Snr (FG)	3 seats 1981–1997
28th	1997	Noel Treacy (FF)	Michael P. Kitt (FF)	Paul Connaughton Snr (FG)	Ulick Burke (FG)
29th	2002	Noel Treacy (FF)	Joe Callanan (FF)	Paul Connaughton Snr (FG)	Paddy McHugh (Ind.)
30th	2007	Noel Treacy (FF)	Michael P. Kitt (FF)	Paul Connaughton Snr (FG)	Ulick Burke (FG)
31st	2011	Colm Keaveney (Lab)	Michael P. Kitt (FF)	Ciarán Cannon (FG)	Paul Connaughton Jnr (FG)
32nd	2016	Seán Canney (Ind.)	Anne Rabbitte (FF)	Ciarán Cannon (FG)	3 seats 2016–2024
33rd	2020	Seán Canney (Ind.)	Anne Rabbitte (FF)	Ciarán Cannon (FG)	3 seats 2016–2024
34th	2024	Seán Canney (Ind.)	Albert Dolan (FF)	Peter Roche (FG)	Louis O'Hara (SF)
