= Tony Kett =

Irish politician (1951–2009)

Senator
- In office 17 September 1997 – 19 April 2009
- Constituency: Administrative Panel

Personal details
- Born: 1 June 1951 County Galway, Ireland
- Died: 19 April 2009 (aged 57) Dublin, Ireland
- Party: Fianna Fáil
- Spouse: Noreen Kett
- Children: 3
- Education: College of Commerce, Rathmines

Tony Kett (1 June 1951 – 19 April 2009) was an Irish Fianna Fáil politician and member of Seanad Éireann. In 1997, he was elected to the 21st Seanad by the Administrative Panel. He was elected again in 2002 and in 2007.

Born in Woodlawn, County Galway, Kett was an administrator of the Central Remedial Clinic. He was reportedly a key member of the "Drumcondra Mafia", as Bertie Ahern's inner circle of constituency supporters are dubbed.

He was co-opted as member of Dublin City Council for the North Inner City electoral area in 1988 to replace Bertie Ahern (who had resigned when he was appointed a government minister) and was re-elected at the 1999 local elections. With the abolition of the dual mandate, he did not contest the 2004 local elections.

He died on 19 April 2009 of cancer. Tributes were led by Taoiseach Brian Cowen and Taoiseach Bertie Ahern.

Kett was succeeded in the Seanad by former County Louth councillor James Carroll.
