= Mary White (Fianna Fáil politician) =

Irish businesswoman and politician (1944–2026)

Senator
- In office 12 September 2002 – 8 June 2016
- Constituency: Industrial and Commercial Panel

Personal details
- Born: Mary Casey; 7 October 1944 Dundalk, County Louth, Ireland
- Died: 4 January 2026 (aged 81) Dublin, Ireland
- Party: Fianna Fáil
- Spouse: Padraic White
- Children: 1
- Education: University College Dublin; Dublin Institute of Technology

Mary White (née Casey; 7 October 1944 – 4 January 2026) was an Irish businesswoman and Fianna Fáil politician. She was a member of Seanad Éireann on the Industrial and Commercial Panel from September 2002 until June 2016.

== Life and career ==
Born in Dundalk on 7 October 1944, she was married to Padraic White, and they had one daughter. She had an arts degree in Economics and Politics from University College Dublin and a Higher Diploma in Architectural Technology from the Dublin Institute of Technology. White co-founded Lir Chocolates in 1987.

White was first elected to the Seanad in 2002, and was re-elected in 2007 and in 2011.

On 6 February 2008, White declared her candidacy to succeed Mary McAleese as President of Ireland for the 2011 Irish presidential election. She was seeking the nomination of the Fianna Fáil party and was the first candidate to declare her intention to run. In May 2011, she said that she would not be seeking a nomination. She retired at the 2016 Seanad election, having failed to be elected to the Dáil at the 2016 general election.

In the Seanad she was the Fianna Fáil spokesperson on Enterprise, Jobs and Innovation.

White died on 4 January 2026, at the age of 81.
