= Geraldine Feeney =

Irish politician (born 1957)

Senator
- In office 12 September 2002 – 25 May 2011
- Constituency: Labour Panel

Personal details
- Born: 9 September 1957 (age 68) County Offaly, Ireland
- Party: Fianna Fáil
- Children: 4
- Education: University College Galway

Geraldine Feeney (born 9 September 1957) is a former Irish Fianna Fáil politician, who was a member of Seanad Éireann from 2002 to 2011. After standing unsuccessfully on the Cultural and Educational Panel in 1997, she was first elected by the Labour Panel in 2002 and was re-elected in 2007. She lost her seat at the 2011 Seanad election.

She took up a position as an ordinary member for the Standards in Public Office Commission on 10 December 2020.
