= John Paul Phelan =

Irish former politician (born 1978)

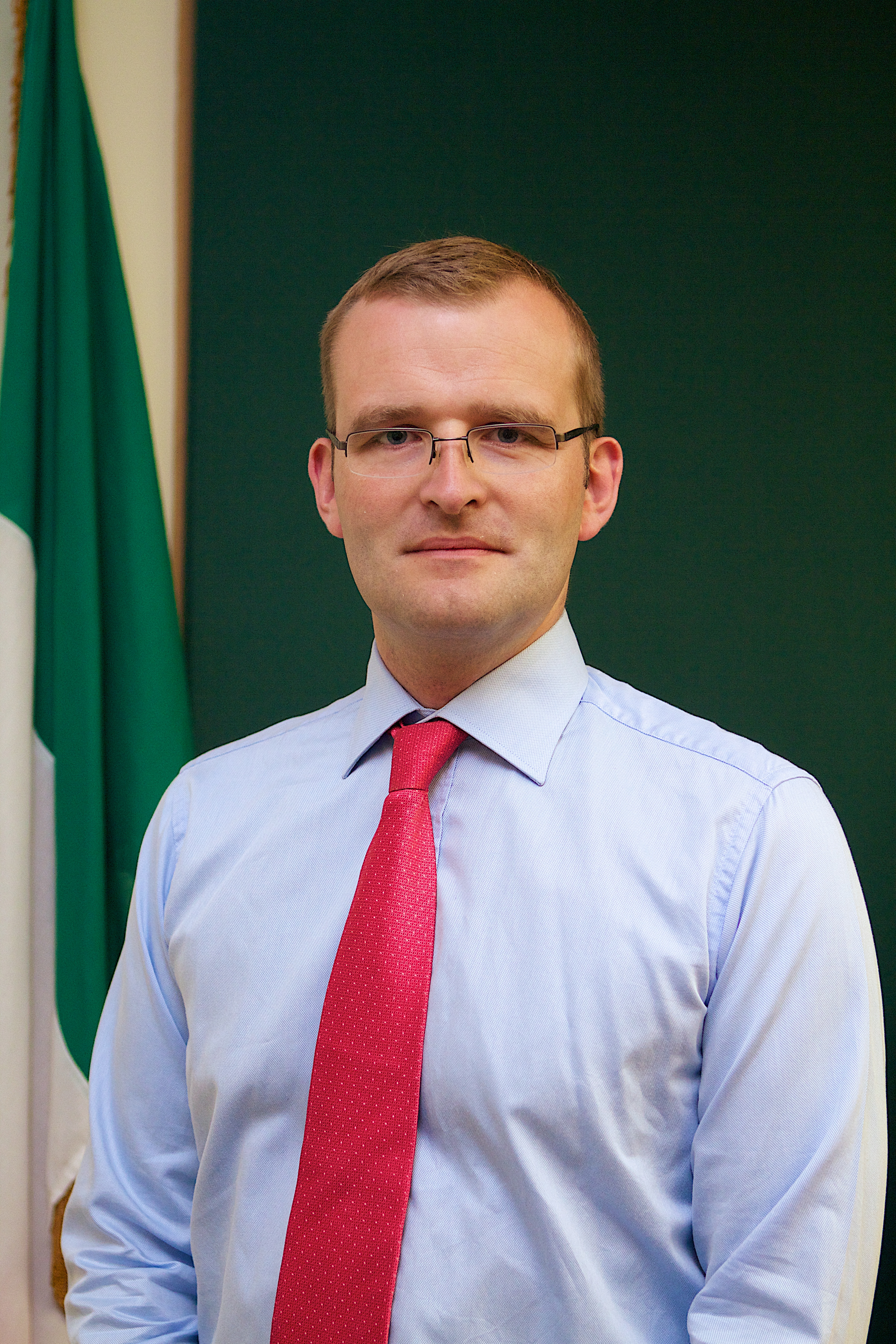
- Phelan in 2014

Minister of State
- 2017–2020: Housing, Planning and Local Government

Teachta Dála
- In office February 2011 – November 2024
- Constituency: Carlow–Kilkenny

Senator
- In office 12 September 2002 – 25 February 2011
- Constituency: Agricultural Panel

Personal details
- Born: 27 September 1978 (age 48) Waterford, Ireland
- Party: Fine Gael
- Spouse: Claire McTernan (m. 2018)
- Children: 1
- Education: Waterford Institute of Technology

John Paul Phelan (born 27 September 1978) is an Irish former Fine Gael politician who served as a Teachta Dála (TD) for the Carlow–Kilkenny constituency from 2011 to 2024. He previously served as Minister of State for Local Government and Electoral Reform from 2017 to 2020. He also served as a Senator for the Labour Panel from 2002 to 2011.

== Early life ==
Phelan grew up on a farm in Tullogher, County Kilkenny. He attended national school in Listerlin and secondary school at Good Counsel College, New Ross before graduating from Waterford Institute of Technology with a degree in economics and finance.

== Political career ==
He was elected to Kilkenny County Council in 1999 for the Piltown local electoral area while still a student. At the age of 20, this made him the youngest person ever elected to the council.

He was elected in 2002 to Seanad Éireann as a Senator for the Agricultural Panel, the youngest member of the 22nd Seanad, and was re-elected in 2007. He was the Fine Gael Seanad spokesperson on Enterprise, Trade and Employment, having previously held the portfolio of Seanad spokesperson on Finance.

In the 2007 general election, he was beaten for the last seat by Mary White of the Green Party. He was a candidate at the 2009 European Parliament election for the East constituency but was not elected.

He was elected as a Fine Gael TD for the Carlow–Kilkenny constituency at the 2011 general election.

Phelan has sat on the Joint Oireachtas Committee on Justice, Law and Defence. He is one of the Irish delegates sitting on the Parliamentary Assembly of the Council of Europe and is an Irish representative on the British–Irish Parliamentary Assembly. He was critical of the Government decision to change the rules regarding the Domiciliary Care Allowance its effect on families of children with Autism. On 10 November 2012, Phelan took part in the "Save our Services" protest march in Waterford.

In June 2017, he was appointed Minister of State at the Department of Housing, Planning and Local Government with special responsibility for Local Government and Electoral Reform.

He called for a "No" vote in the 2018 referendum on Abortion. He has spearheaded legislation which may force political parties to fill 40% of their nominations with migrants, women and ethnic minorities in future elections.

At the general election in February 2020, he was re-elected in the Carlow–Kilkenny constituency. He continued to serve as a junior minister until the new Fianna Fáil–Fine Gael–Green coalition government was formed in June 2020.

In 2023, Phelan announced that he would not contest the next general election.

== Personal life ==
In 2018, Phelan married Fine Gael activist Claire McTernan. In 2020, he suffered a heart attack.

Dáil	Election	Deputy (Party)	Deputy (Party)	Deputy (Party)	Deputy (Party)	Deputy (Party)
2nd	1921	Edward Aylward (SF)	W. T. Cosgrave (SF)	James Lennon (SF)	Gearóid O'Sullivan (SF)	4 seats 1921–1923
3rd	1922	Patrick Gaffney (Lab)	W. T. Cosgrave (PT-SF)	Denis Gorey (FP)	Gearóid O'Sullivan (PT-SF)	4 seats 1921–1923
4th	1923	Edward Doyle (Lab)	W. T. Cosgrave (CnaG)	Denis Gorey (FP)	Michael Shelly (Rep)	Seán Gibbons (CnaG)
4th	1925 by-election	Edward Doyle (Lab)	W. T. Cosgrave (CnaG)	Denis Gorey (FP)	Michael Shelly (Rep)	Thomas Bolger (CnaG)
5th	1927 (Jun)	Edward Doyle (Lab)	W. T. Cosgrave (CnaG)	Denis Gorey (CnaG)	Thomas Derrig (FF)	Richard Holohan (FP)
6th	1927 (Sep)	Edward Doyle (Lab)	W. T. Cosgrave (CnaG)	Peter de Loughry (CnaG)	Thomas Derrig (FF)	Richard Holohan (FP)
6th	1927 by-election	Edward Doyle (Lab)	Denis Gorey (CnaG)	Peter de Loughry (CnaG)	Thomas Derrig (FF)	Richard Holohan (FP)
7th	1932	Francis Humphreys (FF)	Denis Gorey (CnaG)	Desmond FitzGerald (CnaG)	Thomas Derrig (FF)	Seán Gibbons (FF)
8th	1933	James Pattison (Lab)	Richard Holohan (NCP)	Desmond FitzGerald (CnaG)	Thomas Derrig (FF)	Seán Gibbons (FF)
9th	1937	Constituency abolished. See Kilkenny and Carlow–Kildare				

Dáil	Election	Deputy (Party)	Deputy (Party)	Deputy (Party)	Deputy (Party)	Deputy (Party)
13th	1948	James Pattison (NLP)	Thomas Walsh (FF)	Thomas Derrig (FF)	Joseph Hughes (FG)	Patrick Crotty (FG)
14th	1951	Francis Humphreys (FF)	Thomas Walsh (FF)	Thomas Derrig (FF)	Joseph Hughes (FG)	Patrick Crotty (FG)
15th	1954	James Pattison (Lab)	Thomas Walsh (FF)	Thomas Derrig (FF)	Joseph Hughes (FG)	Patrick Crotty (FG)
15th	1956 by-election	James Pattison (Lab)	Martin Medlar (FF)	Thomas Derrig (FF)	Joseph Hughes (FG)	Patrick Crotty (FG)
16th	1957	Francis Humphreys (FF)	Martin Medlar (FF)	Jim Gibbons (FF)	Joseph Hughes (FG)	Patrick Crotty (FG)
16th	1960 by-election	Patrick Teehan (FF)	Martin Medlar (FF)	Jim Gibbons (FF)	Joseph Hughes (FG)	Patrick Crotty (FG)
17th	1961	Séamus Pattison (Lab)	Martin Medlar (FF)	Jim Gibbons (FF)	Desmond Governey (FG)	Patrick Crotty (FG)
18th	1965	Séamus Pattison (Lab)	Tom Nolan (FF)	Jim Gibbons (FF)	Desmond Governey (FG)	Patrick Crotty (FG)
19th	1969	Séamus Pattison (Lab)	Tom Nolan (FF)	Jim Gibbons (FF)	Desmond Governey (FG)	Kieran Crotty (FG)
20th	1973	Séamus Pattison (Lab)	Tom Nolan (FF)	Jim Gibbons (FF)	Desmond Governey (FG)	Kieran Crotty (FG)
21st	1977	Séamus Pattison (Lab)	Tom Nolan (FF)	Jim Gibbons (FF)	Liam Aylward (FF)	Kieran Crotty (FG)
22nd	1981	Séamus Pattison (Lab)	Tom Nolan (FF)	Desmond Governey (FG)	Liam Aylward (FF)	Kieran Crotty (FG)
23rd	1982 (Feb)	Séamus Pattison (Lab)	Jim Gibbons (FF)	Desmond Governey (FG)	Liam Aylward (FF)	Kieran Crotty (FG)
24th	1982 (Nov)	Séamus Pattison (Lab)	M. J. Nolan (FF)	Dick Dowling (FG)	Liam Aylward (FF)	Kieran Crotty (FG)
25th	1987	Séamus Pattison (Lab)	M. J. Nolan (FF)	Martin Gibbons (PDs)	Liam Aylward (FF)	Kieran Crotty (FG)
26th	1989	Séamus Pattison (Lab)	M. J. Nolan (FF)	Phil Hogan (FG)	Liam Aylward (FF)	John Browne (FG)
27th	1992	Séamus Pattison (Lab)	M. J. Nolan (FF)	Phil Hogan (FG)	Liam Aylward (FF)	John Browne (FG)
28th	1997	Séamus Pattison (Lab)	John McGuinness (FF)	Phil Hogan (FG)	Liam Aylward (FF)	John Browne (FG)
29th	2002	Séamus Pattison (Lab)	John McGuinness (FF)	Phil Hogan (FG)	Liam Aylward (FF)	M. J. Nolan (FF)
30th	2007	Mary White (GP)	John McGuinness (FF)	Phil Hogan (FG)	Bobby Aylward (FF)	M. J. Nolan (FF)
31st	2011	Ann Phelan (Lab)	John McGuinness (FF)	Phil Hogan (FG)	John Paul Phelan (FG)	Pat Deering (FG)
31st	2015 by-election	Ann Phelan (Lab)	John McGuinness (FF)	Bobby Aylward (FF)	John Paul Phelan (FG)	Pat Deering (FG)
32nd	2016	Kathleen Funchion (SF)	John McGuinness (FF)	Bobby Aylward (FF)	John Paul Phelan (FG)	Pat Deering (FG)
33rd	2020	Kathleen Funchion (SF)	John McGuinness (FF)	Jennifer Murnane O'Connor (FF)	John Paul Phelan (FG)	Malcolm Noonan (GP)
34th	2024	Natasha Newsome Drennan (SF)	John McGuinness (FF)	Jennifer Murnane O'Connor (FF)	Catherine Callaghan (FG)	Peter "Chap" Cleere (FF)
