= James Carroll (Louth politician) =

Irish former politician (born 1983)

Senator
- In office 26 November 2009 – 25 May 2011
- Constituency: Administrative Panel

Personal details
- Born: 1983/1984 (age 42–43) County Louth, Ireland
- Party: Fianna Fáil
- Education: University College Dublin

James Carroll (born 1983) is an Irish former Fianna Fáil politician who was a member of Seanad Éireann from November 2009 to April 2011. He is a former education vice-president and president of the UCD Students' Union in University College Dublin.

Carroll was elected to Louth County Council for Drogheda East at the local elections in June 2009. He succeeded Tony Kett on the Administrative Panel on 26 November 2009 after Kett's death. This was done without a by-election, as he was the only nominated candidate.

Carroll unsuccessfully contested the 2011 general election for the Louth constituency receiving 8.2% of the vote, and lost his seat in the 2011 Seanad election.
