= Peter Callanan =

Irish politician (1935–2009)

Senator
- In office 17 September 1997 – 11 October 2009
- Constituency: Agricultural Panel

Personal details
- Born: 29 June 1935 Clonakilty, County Cork, Ireland
- Died: 11 October 2009 (aged 74) Innishannon, County Cork, Ireland
- Party: Fianna Fáil
- Spouse: Sheila Callanan
- Children: 6

Peter Callanan (29 June 1935 – 11 October 2009) was an Irish Fianna Fáil politician and served as a member of Seanad Éireann from 1997 until his death in 2009.

Born in Clonakilty, County Cork, Callanan was educated in Mount Melleray College, County Waterford. He was a farmer in Innishannon, County Cork.

A member of Cork County Council from 1979 to 2004, He was an unsuccessful candidate at the 1981 general election for the Cork South-West constituency, and was also an unsuccessful candidate at the 1993 Seanad election. Callanan was elected to the 21st Seanad in 1997 by the Agricultural Panel, and re-elected in 2002 to the 22nd Seanad and in 2007 to the 23rd Seanad.

Callanan died on 11 October 2009. He was married to Sheila Callanan and they had six children.
