= Jim Walsh (Irish politician) =

Irish politician (born 1947)

Senator
- In office 17 September 1997 – 8 June 2016
- Constituency: Agricultural Panel

Personal details
- Born: 5 May 1947 (age 79) New Ross, County Wexford, Ireland
- Party: Fianna Fáil (1974–2015, 2016)
- Other political affiliations: Independent (2015)
- Spouse: Marie Furlong
- Children: 3

Jim Walsh (born 5 May 1947) is an Irish former Fianna Fáil politician and member of Seanad Éireann from 1997 to 2016.

== Early and personal life ==
Walsh is a native of New Ross, County Wexford. Walsh attended New Ross Christian Brothers School. He is married to Marie Furlong, they have one son and two daughters. Outside of his Seanad duties, he works as a businessman and company director. He is a member of the Chartered Institute of Transport, a Senator of Junior Chamber International and is a former president of the Irish Road Hauliers' Association.

== Political career ==
He was elected in 1974 to New Ross Town Council, serving as Mayor for nine terms and a member of Wexford County Council from 1979 to 2004, serving as Mayor from 1992 to 1993. Walsh was National Chairman of the Irish Local Authority Members Association from 1997 to 2002.

In 1997, he was first elected to Seanad Éireann by the Agricultural Panel. From 1997 to 2002, he served as government spokesman on Environment and Local Government in the Seanad. In subsequent terms he served as government spokesperson on Justice, Equality, and Law Reform between 2002 and 2007, and Communications, Energy, and Natural resources from 2007 to 2011. He is the Fianna Fáil Seanad spokesman on Foreign Affairs and Trade and a member of the Foreign Affairs and Trade Committee.

He is a board member of Parliamentarians for Global Action, a New York-based non-governmental organization dealing with peace, democracy, human rights and the rules of law. He is also a member of the Parliamentary Assembly of the Organization for Security and Co-operation in Europe (OSCE) as well as being a member of the British-Irish Parliamentary Assembly and a participant in the International Catholic Legislator's Network since its inauguration.

Walsh has fulfilled a number of international speaking invitations in recent years. In 2011 he was invited to address a conference in Colombo, Sri Lanka on the Northern Ireland peace process. At the invitation of the Pontifical Council for the Family he read a paper on the topic of "The Family" at the World Meeting of Families in Milan, May 2012. At the PGA Conference in Bogota, Colombia, December 2013 he addressed the subject of "Disarmament and Decommissioning—The Northern Ireland Experience and its Relevance for Colombia".

=== Tribunals ===
In April 2008, Walsh claimed "that Chairmen of some of the tribunals used their position in order to act more or less as shop stewards for the wealthy legal profession". He later withdrew the comment, acknowledging that he may have caused offence.

=== Civil partnership legislation ===
On 24 April 2008, Walsh put forward a party motion to counter the Civil Partnership Bill. The Irish Times reported that around 30 unidentified Fianna Fáil backbenchers had signed the motion. One anonymous Senator was quoted as claiming that the motion "would have considerable support from the more conservative sections of the parliamentary party". The Taoiseach, Brian Cowen, responded by insisting that the registration of same-sex couples would not interfere with the constitutional status of marriage. Cowen noted that the Bill had been drawn up in close consultation with the Attorney General and had been included in the programme for government.

The motion was referred to the Fianna Fáil parliamentary party's justice committee on 1 July 2008. A Fianna Fáil spokesperson was quoted as saying that there was "broad support" within the party for the legislation, while the Taoiseach and the Minister for Justice, Equality and Law Reform, Dermot Ahern reaffirmed the constitutional compatibility of the proposed law.

Walsh has repeatedly called for a "freedom of conscience" amendment to the legislation which would bypass equality legislation, allowing people a religious exemption in providing goods and services to gay couples.

In the 2014 "Pantigate" controversy in which the national broadcaster RTÉ paid a purported €85,000 to conservative commentators, Walsh argued that some proponents of same-sex marriage were "dangerous and vicious".

On 31 March 2015, he said in the Seanad that he could not support same-sex marriage and that the money spent on the marriage equality referendum would be better spent on testing the gay community for HIV.

=== Views ===
In November 2009, Walsh claimed that women working outside the home is a major cause of depression in young people, and also expressed annoyance that "David Norris could describe gay people as 'fairies' – while he could not".

On 7 July 2010, he resigned the Fianna Fáil parliamentary party whip, along with Labhrás Ó Murchú and John Hanafin, in protest at the Civil Partnership bill. He rejoined the Fianna Fáil parliamentary party on 23 November 2010.

On 16 July 2013, Walsh opposed the Protection of Life During Pregnancy Bill, and during the Seanad debate quoted an anti-abortion pamphlet's description of dilation and evacuation, which the bill's supporters criticised as inappropriate.

In December 2015, in an abortion-related debate, Walsh told Senator Ivana Bacik that she should seek "treatment for hemorrhoids".

In January 2016, he was re-admitted to the Fianna Fáil parliamentary party. He did not contest the 2016 Seanad election.

=== Wikipedia editing ===
In September 2015, Walsh admitted editing his own Wikipedia entry, claiming it had been edited by "a person from the gay lobby groups". He said that he had removed "certain erroneous comments" but did not say which edits he made or what was erroneous. T.J. McIntyre, a law lecturer at University College Dublin drew attention to edits made from an IP address belonging to the Oireachtas. Edits made from that address included removal of controversial comments made by the former senator about gay people and the Marriage Equality referendum.
