= Camillus Glynn =

Irish politician (born 1941)

Senator
- In office 17 September 1997 – 25 May 2011
- Constituency: Administrative Panel

Personal details
- Born: 4 October 1941 (age 84) Killucan, County Westmeath, Ireland
- Party: Fianna Fáil
- Spouse: Margaret Fallon
- Children: 4

Camillus Glynn (born 4 October 1941) is an Irish former Fianna Fáil politician. He was a member of Seanad Éireann from 1997 to 2011. A former psychiatric nurse, he was first elected to the Seanad in 1997 by the Administrative Panel, on his third attempt. He was an unsuccessful candidate for Dáil Éireann at the 1997 general election for the Westmeath constituency. He served on Westmeath County Council and Mullingar Town Council from 1979 to 2004.

On 9 October 2008, Glynn pleaded guilty to assaulting a businessman he met in a hotel in Mullingar. Glynn punched Tommy Wright, a former Fianna Fáil councillor, in the face after an exchange of words on 25 May 2008. Glynn was ordered to pay €2,500 to a local charity.

He retired from politics at the 2011 Seanad election.
