= Larry Butler (Irish politician) =

Irish former politician

Senator
- In office 13 September 2007 – 25 May 2011
- Constituency: Industrial and Commercial Panel

Personal details
- Born: County Dublin, Ireland
- Party: Fianna Fáil
- Spouse: Kathleen McNicholas
- Children: 4

Larry Butler is an Irish former Fianna Fáil politician, who was a member of Seanad Éireann on the Industrial and Commercial Panel from 2007 to 2011.

== Career ==
He was elected to Dublin County Council in 1991 for the Glencullen area, and was re-elected in 1999 to Dún Laoghaire–Rathdown County Council for the Ballybrack electoral area.

Following an expenses controversy, he resigned the Fianna Fáil party whip on 5 June 2010. He did not contest the 2011 Seanad election.
