= Ann Ormonde =

Irish former politician (born 1935)

Senator
- In office 17 February 1993 – 25 May 2011
- Constituency: Cultural and Educational Panel

Personal details
- Born: 20 January 1935 (age 91) Kilmacthomas, County Waterford, Ireland
- Party: Fianna Fáil
- Education: University College Dublin

Ann Ormonde (born 20 January 1935) is an Irish former Fianna Fáil politician and was a member of Seanad Éireann from 1993 to 2011. She was elected by the Cultural and Educational Panel. She was first elected to the Seanad in 1992 and re-elected at every subsequent election until she lost her seat at the 2011 election.

Born in Kilmacthomas, County Waterford, she was educated at the Presentation Convent, Clonmel and University College Dublin. She is a former Career Guidance Counsellor.

She served as a member of South Dublin County Council for the Terenure–Rathfarnham from 1985 to 2004. She was an unsuccessful candidate for the Dáil in the Dublin South constituency at the 1987, 1989, 1992 and 1997 general elections.
