= Civil Partnership and Certain Rights and Obligations of Cohabitants Act 2010 =

Law providing first legal recognition of same-sex couples in Ireland

The Civil Partnership and Certain Rights and Obligations of Cohabitants Act 2010 is an Act of the Oireachtas (Irish Parliament) which allows same-sex couples to enter into civil partnerships. The Act also provides rights for participants in long-term cohabiting relationships who have not entered into a civil partnership or marriage. There is no difference, under the Act, in the rights and obligations accorded to opposite-sex cohabiting couples or same-sex cohabiting couples; however, there are significant differences between the rights and obligations accorded to civil partners (same-sex) and those accorded to married couples (opposite-sex). The Act marks the penultimate legal step towards the recognition of same-sex partnerships; following the Marriage Act 2015, same-sex partners had access to marriage on the same basis as opposite-sex partners, with civil partnership no longer available.

It had been expected that the first civil partnership ceremony under the law would take place in April 2011 due to the need for further legislation to update Ireland's tax code and social welfare laws, and the legal requirement to give three months notice. However, the legislation does provide a mechanism for exemptions to be sought through the courts, and the first partnership between two men was registered on 7 February 2011. As required by the legislation, and contrary to some subsequent press coverage, the ceremony took place in public at the Civil Registration Office in Dublin. It was not until 5 April 2011, with the registration of a partnership between Hugh Walsh and Barry Dignam, that the media covered a partnership ceremony for the first time in detail.

== Provisions ==
Civil partners must wait two years to get their partnership dissolved. Judicial separation is not allowed. Civil partners are not allowed to adopt children jointly, as married couples are, though one civil partner may adopt singly. Also, civil partners cannot have joint guardianship over any children they raise together. The Act provides for the succession of property, pension entitlements, domestic violence, and maintenance in the event of a breakdown of a relationship. The Act does not make any provision for tax entitlements and allowances, nor does it grant any social welfare benefits to civil partners. These issues are to be dealt with in two separate Bills. The Act makes provision for recognition of foreign relationships in Ireland as civil partnerships. The Act does not deal with residency of same-sex couples that wish to become civil partnered in Ireland.

== Legislative history ==
The Act was passed in the Dáil without a vote on 1 July 2010 and by the Seanad on 8 July 2010 by a vote of 48–4. It was signed into law by the President on 19 July 2010. The Minister for Justice and Law Reform Dermot Ahern said: "This is one of the most important pieces of civil rights legislation to be enacted since independence. Its legislative advance has seen an unprecedented degree of unity and support within both Houses of the Oireachtas."

The Minister for Justice and Law Reform signed the commencement order for the Act on 23 December 2010. The law came into force on 1 January 2011. Due to the three-month waiting period for all civil ceremonies in Ireland, it was expected that the first civil partnership ceremonies would take place in April 2011. The date of commencement of the Act was dependent on further legislation in the areas of taxation and social welfare, which was enacted separately. The Social Welfare and Pensions Bill 2010 was introduced on 19 November 2010. The Bill passed the Dáil on 14 December and the Seanad on 17 December; it was signed by the President on 21 December.

== Recognition of foreign relationships ==
The Minister for Justice and Law Reform also signed, on 23 December 2010, an order under the Act, declaring certain classes of registered foreign relationship to be entitled to be recognised as a civil partnership in Ireland. This order obliges the persons in such a relationship to be treated as civil partners under Irish law from the later of, (a) the day which is 21 days after the date on which the order was made (i.e. 13 January 2011), and (b) the day on which the relationship was registered under the law of the jurisdiction in which it was entered into. Four further orders under the Act were made in 2011, 2012, 2013 and 2014, extending the list of recognised foreign relationships.

Under these orders, a same-sex couple residing in Ireland, but who have already formed, or will form, a legal relationship which is lawful in another jurisdiction, may register to have that relationship recognised in Ireland. Under the Act, such a relationship is recognised in Irish law as a civil partnership, just as if the couple has formed a civil partnership in Ireland. For example, a same-sex couple living in Ireland, but who may already have formed a civil partnership in Northern Ireland under the UK's Civil Partnership Act 2004, or say, have been legally married in Spain, can apply to have that relationship recognised as a civil partnership in Irish law, without the need to form a new civil partnership under the Act.

Section 5 of the Act states the criteria used to govern which classes of foreign relationships can be recognised. They are:

- the relationship is exclusive in nature
- the relationship is permanent unless the parties dissolve it through the courts
- the relationship has been registered under the law of that jurisdiction, and
- the rights and obligations attendant on the relationship are, in the opinion of the Minister, sufficient to indicate that the relationship would be treated comparably to a Civil Partnership.

== Difference from marriage ==
While the Act provides many rights and obligations similar to marriage in Ireland, it does not provide the option for same-sex couples to be legally married.

Civil partnership, as defined by this Act, is exclusively available to same-sex couples, and – until the Thirty-fourth Amendment of the Constitution of Ireland – marriage was exclusively available to opposite-sex couples.

For in-depth analyses of these differences, refer to the seminar study by the Irish Council for Civil Liberties, the legal opinion by Barrister Brian Barrington (commissioned by Marriage Equality), and in the case of children, the report by the Law Reform Commission.

== See also ==
- List of laws and reports on LGBT rights in Ireland
- Gay and Lesbian Equality Network
- Thirty-fourth Amendment of the Constitution of Ireland – a 2015 constitutional referendum which allowed same-sex marriage.
- Marriage Act 2015 – which legalised same-sex marriage in Ireland
- Zappone v. Revenue Commissioners – a 2006 High Court challenge seeking the recognition of a Canadian same-sex marriage.
