= University constituency =

Parliamentary constituency representing a university

A university constituency is a constituency, used in elections to a legislature, that represents the members of one or more universities rather than residents of a geographical area. These may or may not involve plural voting, in which voters are eligible to vote in or as part of this entity and their home area's geographical constituency.

When James VI inherited the English throne in 1603, the system was adopted by the Parliament of England. The system was continued in the Parliament of Great Britain (from 1707 to 1800) and the United Kingdom Parliament, until 1950. It was also used in the Parliament of Ireland, in the Kingdom of Ireland, from 1613 to 1800, and in the Irish Free State from 1922 to 1936.

Such constituencies have also existed in Japan and in some countries of the British Empire such as India.

At present there are four instances in two countries of university constituencies: two in Seanad Éireann (the upper—and in general less powerful—house of the legislature of the Republic of Ireland) and two in the Senate of Rwanda.

== Summary ==
Constituency	Parliament	Years	No. of representatives
Cambridge University	England	1603–1707	2
Cambridge University	Great Britain	1707–1800	2
Cambridge University	United Kingdom	1801–1950	2
Oxford University	England	1603–1707	2
Oxford University	Great Britain	1707–1800	2
Oxford University	United Kingdom	1801–1950	2
Dublin University	Ireland	1613–1800	2
Dublin University	United Kingdom of Great Britain and Ireland	1801–1922	1 (1801–1832); 2 (1832–1922)
Dublin University	Irish Republic	1918–1922	2 (1918–1921); 4 (1921–1922)
Dublin University	Southern Ireland (UK)	1921–1922	4
Dublin University	Irish Free State	1922–1937	3
Dublin University	Republic of Ireland (Seanad Éireann)	1938–present	3
Edinburgh and St Andrews Universities	United Kingdom	1868–1918	1 between
Glasgow and Aberdeen Universities	United Kingdom	1868–1918	1 between
London University	United Kingdom	1868–1950	1
Combined English Universities	United Kingdom	1918–1950	2 between
Combined Scottish Universities	United Kingdom	1918–1950	3 between
National University of Ireland	United Kingdom	1918–1922	1
National University of Ireland	Irish Republic	1918–1922	1 (1918–1921); 4 (1921–1922)
National University of Ireland	Southern Ireland (UK)	1921–1922	4
National University of Ireland	Irish Free State	1922–1937	3
National University of Ireland	Republic of Ireland (Seanad Éireann)	1938–present	3
Queen's University of Belfast	United Kingdom	1918–1950	1
Queen's University of Belfast	Irish Republic	1918–1921	1
University of Wales	United Kingdom	1918–1950	1
Queen's University of Belfast (NI)	Northern Ireland (UK)	1921–1969	4
Queen's University of Belfast (NI)	Irish Republic	1921–1922	4

As shown, at Westminster (in the English then successor British parliaments) 4 seats were incepted in 1603 and the final total, 12, were abolished in 1950.

The Northern Irish body was the last in the UK to abolish such seats: it abolished its four for Queens, Belfast in 1969.

Six such seats continue in Seanad Éireann, the upper chamber of the Oireachtas (legislature of the Republic of Ireland). They are the sole directly elected members of the Seanad, with the remainder of the seats being elected by a combination of members of Oireachtas, incoming TDs and outgoing Senators, and local councillors, along with 11 members appointed by the Taoiseach.

== United Kingdom ==
King James VI of Scotland, on ascending the English throne, brought to the English Parliament a practice of allowing the universities to elect members. The king believed that the universities were often affected by the decisions of Parliament, and ought therefore to have representation in it. James gave the University of Cambridge and the University of Oxford two seats each from 1603. The voters were the graduates of the university, whether they were resident or not; they could vote for the university seats in addition to any other vote that they might have.

After the Act of Union 1800 with Ireland, the University of Dublin (Trinity College), which had elected two MPs to the Parliament of Ireland since 1613, was allowed one member from 1801 and two from 1832.

In 1868, three new one-member seats were created: University of London; Glasgow and Aberdeen universities combined; and St Andrews and Edinburgh universities combined.

In 1918, the Queen's University of Belfast and the National University of Ireland each received seats. Both these, as well as the University of Dublin, also received four seats in the devolved Stormont parliament and the Southern Ireland parliament respectively that were established in 1920 and first used in elections in 1921. Also in 1918, the Scottish universities switched to all electing three members jointly (see Combined Scottish Universities).

In 1918, all the other English universities (i.e. except for Cambridge, Oxford and London) were enfranchised as a single constituency with two seats, as Combined English Universities. They were Birmingham, Bristol, Durham, Leeds, Liverpool, Manchester, and Sheffield. Reading was added in August 1928. The University of Wales also received one seat in 1918.

1918 also saw the introduction of the single transferable vote for university constituencies.

=== Abolition ===
The Labour government in 1930 attempted to abolish the university constituencies but was defeated in the House of Commons. Although the members for the university constituencies were usually Conservatives, in the later years independent candidates began to win many of the seats. The Labour government finally abolished the university constituencies via the Representation of the People Act 1948, with effect from the dissolution of Parliament in 1950, along with all other examples of plural voting.

The Queen's University, Belfast constituency survived in the Parliament of Northern Ireland until it was abolished in 1968 (with effect from the dissolution of Parliament in 1969) by the Electoral Law Act (Northern Ireland) 1968 (c. 20 (N.I.)). This was one of several measures by the then Northern Ireland Prime Minister Terence O'Neill to reform elements of the election franchise and deal with many long-standing civil rights grievances.

=== Notable members ===
The members for the university constituencies include many notable statesmen: William Pitt the Younger and Lord Palmerston both served as MPs for Cambridge University, and Robert Peel and William Ewart Gladstone each served as MP for Oxford University for portions of their careers. In his last years Ramsay MacDonald was MP for Combined Scottish Universities after losing his previous seat in the 1935 general election. Many criticised this, as he had previously sought to abolish the seats whilst Labour prime minister and many now felt the seats were being used to provide a failed politician with a seat he could not find elsewhere.

The humorist and law reform activist A. P. Herbert sat as an independent member for Oxford University from 1935 to 1950. He described the counting of the votes at the 1935 election in a chapter entitled 'P.R.': Or, Standing for Oxford in his 1936 book Mild and Bitter.

=== List of members ===
Only members after 1885 are shown.

Election	Members														
Election	Cambridge Uni.		Oxford Uni.		London Uni.					Edinburgh & St Andrews Uni.	Glasgow & Aberdeen Uni.			Dublin Uni.	
1885	Raikes (Con)	Hope (Con)	Talbot (Con)	Mowbray (Con)	Lubbock (Lib → Lib U)					J. Macdonald (Con)	Campbell (Con)			Holmes (Con)	Plunket (Con → IUA)
1886	Raikes (Con)	Hope (Con)	Talbot (Con)	Mowbray (Con)	Lubbock (Lib → Lib U)					J. Macdonald (Con)	Campbell (Con)			Holmes (Con)	Plunket (Con → IUA)
1887 (b)	Raikes (Con)	Stokes (Con)	Talbot (Con)	Mowbray (Con)	Lubbock (Lib → Lib U)					J. Macdonald (Con)	Campbell (Con)			Madden (IUA)	Plunket (Con → IUA)
1888 (b)	Raikes (Con)	Stokes (Con)	Talbot (Con)	Mowbray (Con)	Lubbock (Lib → Lib U)					Darling (Con)	Campbell (Con)			Madden (IUA)	Plunket (Con → IUA)
1890 (b)	Raikes (Con)	Stokes (Con)	Talbot (Con)	Mowbray (Con)	Lubbock (Lib → Lib U)					Pearson (Con)	Campbell (Con)			Madden (IUA)	Plunket (Con → IUA)
1891 (b)	Jebb (Con)	Stokes (Con)	Talbot (Con)	Mowbray (Con)	Lubbock (Lib → Lib U)					Pearson (Con)	Campbell (Con)			Madden (IUA)	Plunket (Con → IUA)
1892	Jebb (Con)	Gorst (Con)	Talbot (Con)	Mowbray (Con)	Lubbock (Lib → Lib U)					Pearson (Con)	Campbell (Con)			Carson (IUA)	Plunket (Con → IUA)
1895	Jebb (Con)	Gorst (Con)	Talbot (Con)	Mowbray (Con)	Lubbock (Lib → Lib U)					Pearson (Con)	Campbell (Con)			Carson (IUA)	Plunket (Con → IUA)
1895 (b)	Jebb (Con)	Gorst (Con)	Talbot (Con)	Mowbray (Con)	Lubbock (Lib → Lib U)					Pearson (Con)	Campbell (Con)			Carson (IUA)	Lecky (Lib U)
1896 (b)	Jebb (Con)	Gorst (Con)	Talbot (Con)	Mowbray (Con)	Lubbock (Lib → Lib U)					Priestley (Con)	Campbell (Con)			Carson (IUA)	Lecky (Lib U)
1899 (b)	Jebb (Con)	Gorst (Con)	Talbot (Con)	Anson (Lib U → Con)	Lubbock (Lib → Lib U)					Priestley (Con)	Campbell (Con)			Carson (IUA)	Lecky (Lib U)
1900 (b)	Jebb (Con)	Gorst (Con)	Talbot (Con)	Anson (Lib U → Con)	Foster (Lib U → Lib)					Tuke (Con)	Campbell (Con)			Carson (IUA)	Lecky (Lib U)
1900	Jebb (Con)	Gorst (Con)	Talbot (Con)	Anson (Lib U → Con)	Foster (Lib U → Lib)					Tuke (Con)	Campbell (Con)			Carson (IUA)	Lecky (Lib U)
1903 (b)	Jebb (Con)	Gorst (Con)	Talbot (Con)	Anson (Lib U → Con)	Foster (Lib U → Lib)					Tuke (Con)	Campbell (Con)			Carson (IUA)	Campbell (IUA)
1906	Butcher (Con)	Rawlinson (Con)	Talbot (Con)	Anson (Lib U → Con)	Magnus (Lib U → Con)					Tuke (Con)	Craik (Con)			Carson (IUA)	Campbell (IUA)
Jan 1910	Butcher (Con)	Rawlinson (Con)	Cecil (Con)	Anson (Lib U → Con)	Magnus (Lib U → Con)					Finlay (Lib U → Con)	Craik (Con)			Carson (IUA)	Campbell (IUA)
Dec 1910	Butcher (Con)	Rawlinson (Con)	Cecil (Con)	Anson (Lib U → Con)	Magnus (Lib U → Con)					Finlay (Lib U → Con)	Craik (Con)			Carson (IUA)	Campbell (IUA)
1911 (b)	Larmor (Con)	Rawlinson (Con)	Cecil (Con)	Anson (Lib U → Con)	Magnus (Lib U → Con)					Finlay (Lib U → Con)	Craik (Con)			Carson (IUA)	Campbell (IUA)
1912 (b)	Larmor (Con)	Rawlinson (Con)	Cecil (Con)	Anson (Lib U → Con)	Magnus (Lib U → Con)					Finlay (Lib U → Con)	Craik (Con)			Carson (IUA)	Campbell (IUA)
1914 (b)	Larmor (Con)	Rawlinson (Con)	Cecil (Con)	Prothero (Con)	Magnus (Lib U → Con)					Finlay (Lib U → Con)	Craik (Con)			Carson (IUA)	Campbell (IUA)
1916 (b)	Larmor (Con)	Rawlinson (Con)	Cecil (Con)	Prothero (Con)	Magnus (Lib U → Con)					Johnston (Con)	Craik (Con)			Carson (IUA)	Campbell (IUA)
1917 (b)	Larmor (Con)	Rawlinson (Con)	Cecil (Con)	Prothero (Con)	Magnus (Lib U → Con)					Cheyne (Con)	Craik (Con)			Carson (IUA)	Samuels (IUA)
1917 (b)	Larmor (Con)	Rawlinson (Con)	Cecil (Con)	Prothero (Con)	Magnus (Lib U → Con)	Combined English Uni.		Uni. of Wales	Combined Scottish Uni.			Queen's Uni. of Belfast	National Uni. of Ireland	Woods (Ind Con)	Samuels (IUA)
1918	Larmor (Con)	Rawlinson (Con)	Cecil (Con)	Prothero (Con)	Magnus (Lib U → Con)	Conway (Con)	Fisher (Co Lib → Nat Lib → Lib)	J. Lewis (Co Lib)	Cowan (Lib)	Cheyne (Con)	Craik (Con)	Whitla (UUP)	MacNeill (SF)	Woods (Ind Con)	Samuels (IUA)
1919 (b)	Larmor (Con)	Rawlinson (Con)	Cecil (Con)	Oman (Con)	Magnus (Lib U → Con)	Conway (Con)	Fisher (Co Lib → Nat Lib → Lib)	J. Lewis (Co Lib)	Cowan (Lib)	Cheyne (Con)	Craik (Con)	Whitla (UUP)	MacNeill (SF)	Woods (Ind Con)	Jellett (IUA)
1922	J. Butler (Ind Lib)	Rawlinson (Con)	Cecil (Con)	Oman (Con)	Russell-Wells (Con)	Conway (Con)	Fisher (Co Lib → Nat Lib → Lib)	T. Lewis (Nat Lib)	Cowan (Lib)	Berry (Con)	Craik (Con)	Whitla (UUP)	Abolished		
1923	G. Butler (Con)	Rawlinson (Con)	Cecil (Con)	Oman (Con)	Russell-Wells (Con)	Conway (Con)	Fisher (Co Lib → Nat Lib → Lib)	Davies (Christ. Pacifist → Lab)	Cowan (Lib)	Berry (Con)	Craik (Con)	Sinclair (UUP)			
1924 (b)	G. Butler (Con)	Rawlinson (Con)	Cecil (Con)	Oman (Con)	Russell-Wells (Con)	Conway (Con)	Fisher (Co Lib → Nat Lib → Lib)	Davies (Christ. Pacifist → Lab)	Cowan (Lib)	Berry (Con)	Craik (Con)	Sinclair (UUP)			
1924	G. Butler (Con)	Rawlinson (Con)	Cecil (Con)	Oman (Con)	Graham-Little (Ind → Nat Ind)	Conway (Con)	Fisher (Co Lib → Nat Lib → Lib)	Evans (Lib)	Cowan (Lib)	Berry (Con)	Craik (Con)	Sinclair (UUP)			
1926 (b)	G. Butler (Con)	Withers (Con)	Cecil (Con)	Oman (Con)	Graham-Little (Ind → Nat Ind)	Conway (Con)	Hopkinson (Con)	Evans (Lib)	Cowan (Lib)	Berry (Con)	Craik (Con)	Sinclair (UUP)			
1927 (b)	G. Butler (Con)	Withers (Con)	Cecil (Con)	Oman (Con)	Graham-Little (Ind → Nat Ind)	Conway (Con)	Hopkinson (Con)	Evans (Lib)	Cowan (Lib)	Berry (Con)	Buchan (Con)	Sinclair (UUP)			
1929	Wilson (Con)	Withers (Con)	Cecil (Con)	Oman (Con)	Graham-Little (Ind → Nat Ind)	Conway (Con)	Rathbone (Ind)	Evans (Lib)	Cowan (Lib)	Berry (Con)	Buchan (Con)	Sinclair (UUP)			
1931	Wilson (Con)	Withers (Con)	Cecil (Con)	Oman (Con)	Graham-Little (Ind → Nat Ind)	Craddock (Con)	Rathbone (Ind)	Evans (Lib)	Cowan (Lib)	Skelton (Con)	Buchan (Con)	Sinclair (UUP)			
1934 (b)	Wilson (Con)	Withers (Con)	Cecil (Con)	Oman (Con)	Graham-Little (Ind → Nat Ind)	Craddock (Con)	Rathbone (Ind)	Evans (Lib)	Morrison (Lib → Nat Lib)	Skelton (Con)	Buchan (Con)	Sinclair (UUP)			
1935 (b)	Pickthorn (Con)	Withers (Con)	Cecil (Con)	Oman (Con)	Graham-Little (Ind → Nat Ind)	Craddock (Con)	Rathbone (Ind)	Evans (Lib)	Morrison (Lib → Nat Lib)	Skelton (Con)	Kerr (Con)	Sinclair (UUP)			
1935	Pickthorn (Con)	Withers (Con)	Cecil (Con)	Herbert (Ind)	Graham-Little (Ind → Nat Ind)	Craddock (Con)	Rathbone (Ind)	Evans (Lib)	Morrison (Lib → Nat Lib)	Skelton (Con)	Kerr (Con)	Sinclair (UUP)			
1936 (b)	Pickthorn (Con)	Withers (Con)	Cecil (Con)	Herbert (Ind)	Graham-Little (Ind → Nat Ind)	Craddock (Con)	Rathbone (Ind)	Evans (Lib)	Morrison (Lib → Nat Lib)	R. MacDonald (Nat Lab)	Kerr (Con)	Sinclair (UUP)			
1937 (b)	Pickthorn (Con)	Withers (Con)	Salter (Ind)	Herbert (Ind)	Graham-Little (Ind → Nat Ind)	Harvey (Ind prog.)	Rathbone (Ind)	Evans (Lib)	Morrison (Lib → Nat Lib)	R. MacDonald (Nat Lab)	Kerr (Con)	Sinclair (UUP)			
1938 (b)	Pickthorn (Con)	Withers (Con)	Salter (Ind)	Herbert (Ind)	Graham-Little (Ind → Nat Ind)	Harvey (Ind prog.)	Rathbone (Ind)	Evans (Lib)	Morrison (Lib → Nat Lib)	Anderson (Nat Ind)	Kerr (Con)	Sinclair (UUP)			
1940 (b)	Pickthorn (Con)	Hill (Ind Con)	Salter (Ind)	Herbert (Ind)	Graham-Little (Ind → Nat Ind)	Harvey (Ind prog.)	Rathbone (Ind)	Evans (Lib)	Morrison (Lib → Nat Lib)	Anderson (Nat Ind)	Kerr (Con)	Savory (UUP)			
1943 (b)	Pickthorn (Con)	Hill (Ind Con)	Salter (Ind)	Herbert (Ind)	Graham-Little (Ind → Nat Ind)	Harvey (Ind prog.)	Rathbone (Ind)	Gruffydd (Lib)	Morrison (Lib → Nat Lib)	Anderson (Nat Ind)	Kerr (Con)	Savory (UUP)			
1945 (b)	Pickthorn (Con)	Hill (Ind Con)	Salter (Ind)	Herbert (Ind)	Graham-Little (Ind → Nat Ind)	Harvey (Ind prog.)	Rathbone (Ind)	Gruffydd (Lib)	Boyd-Orr (Ind)	Anderson (Nat Ind)	Kerr (Con)	Savory (UUP)			
1945	Pickthorn (Con)	Harris (Ind)	Salter (Ind)	Herbert (Ind)	Graham-Little (Ind → Nat Ind)	Lindsay (Ind)	Rathbone (Ind)	Gruffydd (Lib)	Boyd-Orr (Ind)	Anderson (Nat Ind)	Kerr (Con)	Savory (UUP)			
1946 (b)	Pickthorn (Con)	Harris (Ind)	Salter (Ind)	Herbert (Ind)	Graham-Little (Ind → Nat Ind)	Lindsay (Ind)	Strauss (Con)	Gruffydd (Lib)	Elliot (Con)	Anderson (Nat Ind)	Kerr (Con)	Savory (UUP)			
1950	Abolished														

== Ireland ==
There are two university constituencies in Seanad Éireann, with graduates of the Dublin University and National University of Ireland entitled to elect three Senators each. Only graduates who are Irish citizens are entitled to vote in these elections. There is no residency requirement so those qualifying who are resident outside the State may vote. Elections are conducted under the single transferable vote and by postal ballot.

When the Irish Free State seceded from the UK in 1922, its new lower house of parliament, the Free State Dáil, had three seats each for the two university constituencies. However, under the Electoral Act 1923 voters registered in a university constituency were not permitted to also vote in a geographical one. Both university constituencies were ultimately abolished by the Constitution (Amendment No. 23) Act 1936 and the Electoral (University Constituencies) Act 1936, which took effect on the dissolution of the Dáil in 1937. These two constituencies were recreated in Seanad Éireann under the Constitution of Ireland adopted in 1937, with the first Seanad election in 1938.

Some politicians have called for university representation to be abolished, on the ground that it is unacceptable that possession of a degree should confer greater electoral rights than those available to other voters. An example of this view can be found in the Green Party submission on Seanad reform in 2004.

=== List of members ===
A cell marked → has a different colour background to the preceding cell and denotes an incumbent who defected or won a re-election for another party.

==== Dáil Éireann ====
Independent Unionist Sinn Féin Ulster Unionist Cumann na nGaedheal Independent Fianna Fáil Ceann Comhairle

Constituency	1918	19	1921	1922	1923	23	Jun 1927	Sep 1927	1932	1933	33	36
Queen's University of Belfast	Whitla		Campbell	Not represented in Irish Free State Dáils								
Queen's University of Belfast			Robb	Not represented in Irish Free State Dáils								
Queen's University of Belfast			Johnstone	Not represented in Irish Free State Dáils								
Queen's University of Belfast			Morrison	Not represented in Irish Free State Dáils								
Dublin University	Woods		Alton	→								
Dublin University	Samuels	Jellett	Craig	→							Rowlette	
Dublin University			Thrift	→								
Dublin University			Fitzgibbon	→								
National University of Ireland	MacNeill		→	McGilligan								
National University of Ireland			English	Magennis	→		Clery	Tierney	Maguire			
National University of Ireland			Hayes		→		→			Concannon		
National University of Ireland			Stockley									

==== Seanad Éireann ====
Independent Fianna Fáil Labour Fine Gael Human Dignity Alliance

Constituency	1938	1943	1944	47	1948	1951	52	53	1954	1957	60	1961	1965	1969	70	1973	1977	79	1981	1982	1983	1987	1989	1993	1997	2002	2007	09	2011	2016	18	2020
Dublin University	Alton	Kingsmill Moore		Bigger		Budd	Jessop		Sheehy-Skeffington			J. Ross	Sheehy-Skeffington		West				S. Ross										Barrett	Ruane		
Dublin University	Rowlette		Johnston		Stanford									Robinson								→	Hederman	Henry			Bacik	→				
Dublin University	Johnston	Fearon									Jessop					Browne	C. C. O'Brien	McGuinness		West	McGuinness	Norris										
National University of Ireland	Barniville											Ó Conalláin		Horgan			Hussey		→	Dooge		O'Toole							Crown	McDowell		
National University of Ireland	Tierney		M.J. Ryan	G. O'Brien									Alton			Martin			L. Ryan	B. Ryan				Lee	B. Ryan	→	Mullen				→	
National University of Ireland	Concannon							Cunningham	McHugh	Quinlan							Murphy				M. D. Higgins	Murphy	Quinn							A. M. Higgins		

== Other countries ==
- Australia: the electoral district of University of Sydney returned one member of the New South Wales Legislative Assembly between 1876 and 1880. It was abolished one year after the second member elected, Edmund Barton, took his seat. Graduates of the University of Sydney wore academic gowns while voting.
- India: India had university constituencies before independence, but these were abolished with the adoption of the modern Constitution of India. Nevertheless, today the President of India has the authority to appoint not more than twelve scientists, artists, or other persons who have special knowledge in similar fields, to the Rajya Sabha, the upper house in the Parliament of India. Currently, the upper houses of the state legislatures in the six states that have them have graduates' constituencies, that elect one-twelfth of their members. Each graduates' constituency is defined geographically rather than by university; graduates of any approved Indian university may choose to register in the graduates' constituency of their place of residence instead of registering in the ordinary constituency.
- Rwanda: Two members of the Senate of Rwanda are elected by the staff of universities.
- Sweden: The non-theological faculties at the universities of Uppsala and Lund, as well as the Royal Swedish Academy of Sciences, had the right to send two members to the Estate of the Clergy in the Riksdag of the Estates from 1828 to its abolition in 1866.
- Thirteen Colonies: The College of William & Mary held a seat in the House of Burgesses of the Virginia Colony in 1693, and was supported by taxes on tobacco and furs. This seat was revoked after the House of Burgesses became the House of Delegates of the Commonwealth of Virginia within the newly independent United States of America.
- Bavaria: From 1946 to 1999, the Bavarian upper house, the Bavarian Senate had reserved three seats to universities and colleges.

== See also ==
- Category: Members of the Parliament of the United Kingdom for university constituencies
- Functional constituency
