= IJL =

IJL or Ijl may refer to:

- International Journal of Lexicography
- International Journal of Listening
- Banu Ijl, Arab tribe
