= 1923 National University of Ireland by-election =

By-election to the 4th Dáil

- 3 November 1923
- Turnout: 1,119 (70.8%)
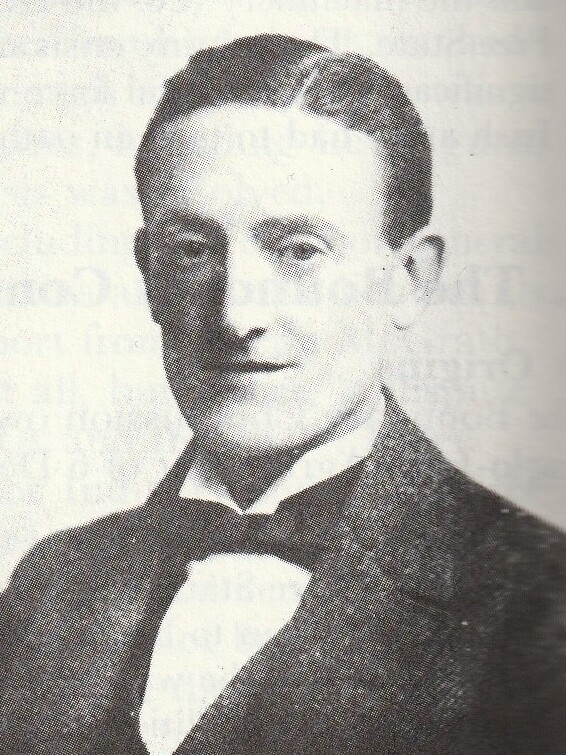

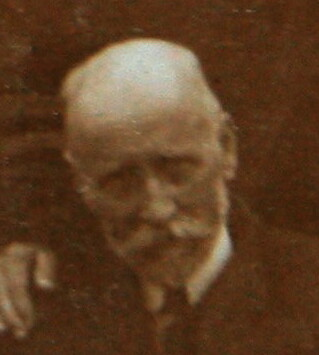
Nominee	Patrick McGilligan	William Stockley
Party	Cumann na nGaedheal	Republican
First preferences	849	261
Percentage	76.5%	23.5%
TD before election
Eoin MacNeill
Cumann na nGaedheal
TD after election
Patrick McGilligan
Cumann na nGaedheal

A Dáil by-election was held in the constituency of National University of Ireland in the Irish Free State on Saturday, 25 October 1923, to fill a vacancy in the 4th Dáil due to Eoin MacNeill of Cumann na nGaedheal being elected for another constituency.

At the 1923 general election, Eoin MacNeill was elected as a TD for both Clare and for the National University of Ireland (NUI). He chose to sit for Clare, vacating his seat for the NUI on 3 October 1923. This was in accordance with section 55 of the Electoral Act 1923.

NUI was a three seat constituency to which those who had received a degree other than an honorary degree from the National University of Ireland were eligible to vote if they were not registered to vote in another constituency. A government motion to issue the writ of election to fill the vacancy was agreed on 11 October 1923.

The Cumann na nGaedheal candidate, Patrick McGilligan, had contested North Derry at the 1918 general election and the 1919 North Derry by-election for Sinn Féin; on both occasions, he was defeated by the Ulster Unionist Party candidate. The Republican candidate, William Stockley, was a former TD who had been elected for NUI at the uncontested 1921 election and the contested 1922 general election. He was defeated at the 1923 general election.

== Result ==
The by-election was held on 3 November and was won by Patrick McGilligan. The Irish Times reported that "little or no public interest was manifested in the proceedings".

1923 National University of Ireland by-election
Party	Candidate	FPv%	Count
Party	Candidate	FPv%	1
Cumann na nGaedheal	Patrick McGilligan	76.5	849
Republican	William Stockley	23.5	261
Electorate: 1,567 Valid: 1,110 Spoilt: 9 Quota: 556 Turnout: 70.8%

== Later career ==
McGilligan represented NUI until its abolition as a Dáil constituency at the 1937 general election. At that election, he was elected for Dublin North-West, which he represented until 1948. At the 1948 general election, he was elected for Dublin North-Central, which he represented until his defeat at the 1965 general election. He would serve as Minister for Industry and Commerce, Minister for External Affairs, Minister for Finance, and as Attorney General.
