= Rónán Mullen =

Irish politician (born 1970)

Senator Rónán Mullen
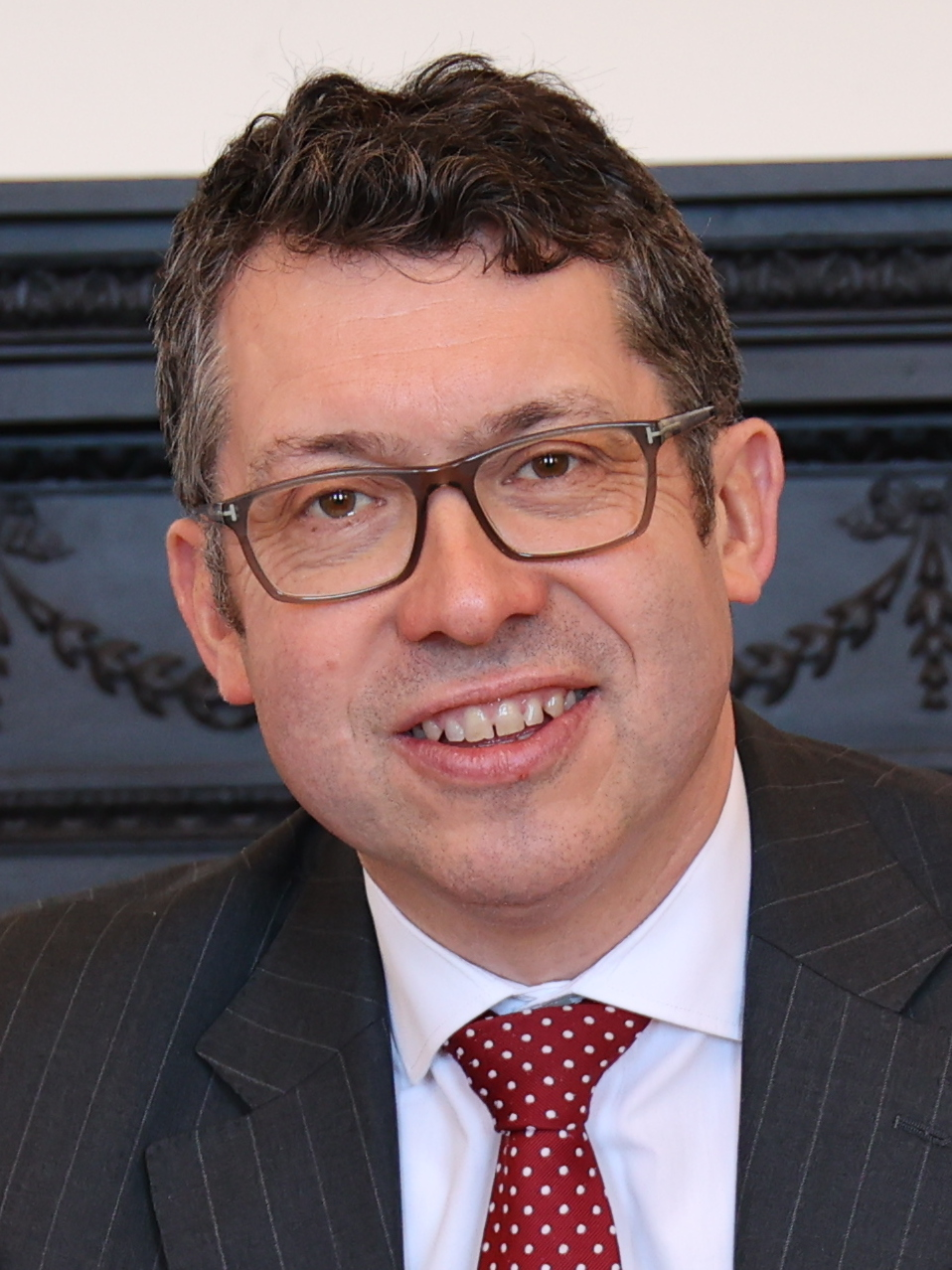
- Mullen in 2025

Senator
- Incumbent
- Assumed office 13 September 2007
- Constituency: National University

Personal details
- Born: 13 October 1970 (age 55) County Galway, Ireland
- Party: Independent; Human Dignity Alliance (since 2018)
- Other political affiliations: European Christian Political Party
- Education: University College Galway; Dublin City University; King's Inns
- Website: ronanmullen.ie

Rónán Thomas Mullen (born 13 October 1970) is an Irish independent senator and former delegate to the Council of Europe. He is the leader of the Human Dignity Alliance, an anti-abortion political party formed in 2018. He was elected to the Seanad for the National University constituency in July 2007 and re-elected in 2011, 2016 and 2020. Mullen is a frequent media commentator on social and political topics. The first National University of Ireland senator appointed to the Council of Europe, he received coverage for his role in opposing the McCafferty Report which sought to limit the right to conscientious objection for medical staff in the case of abortions.

Mullen was born and educated in County Galway, and studied French and English at University College Galway, where he became president of the Students' Union. Then, in 1993, he moved to Dublin and studied for a master's degree in journalism, after which he worked as a teacher and press secretary. In 1999 he began training as a barrister in the King's Inns, during which he won the Irish Times Debate. He was called to the Bar in 2003. Since 2001 he has been a lecturer in the Institute of Technology, Blanchardstown.

Mullen was prominent in referendum campaigns opposing same-sex marriage in 2015 and abortion in 2018 respectively.

He formed the Human Dignity Alliance in 2018. He is a member of the European political party European Christian Political Party.

== Background ==
Mullen was born in County Galway, son of Maura Hobbs and Tom Mullen. He grew up in Ahascragh, County Galway. After primary school in Kilglass National School and secondary school in Holy Rosary College in Mountbellew, he obtained a BA degree in English and French from University College Galway. Mullen was elected president of UCG Students' Union in 1991–92. He then obtained a master's degree in journalism from Dublin City University in 1993.

After working as a teacher for a year in Liberties Vocational School, Mullen was appointed in 1994 to the post of Administration Officer for Academic and Student Affairs in Dundalk Regional Technical College (now Dundalk Institute of Technology) where he worked until March 1996. From 1996 to 2001, Mullen worked in the Communications Office of the Archdiocese of Dublin and appeared as a spokesperson for the Archdiocese and Cardinal Desmond Connell. In 1999, he began studies for a Diploma in Legal Studies and a Barrister-at-Law degree from King's Inns. While studying, he and Michael Deasy were the members of the victorious King's Inns team in the Irish Times Debate in 2000. Mullen was the first winner of that competition to later be elected to the Oireachtas. Mullen was called to the Bar of Ireland in 2003.

In October 2001, he began a weekly column with the Irish Examiner and later moved to the Irish Daily Mail. He also writes occasionally for other publications, including The Irish Catholic. He teaches courses in Law, Communication and Personal Development in Institute of Technology, Blanchardstown in Dublin, where he has been on the staff since 2001.

== Seanad Éireann ==
In 2007, Mullen ran for the Seanad in the National University constituency; he obtained the second-highest number of first preference votes and was elected to the third seat behind sitting senators Joe O'Toole and Feargal Quinn, defeating Labour Senator Brendan Ryan. In 2011 he was re-elected to the Seanad, topping the poll with 6,459 (19%) of first preference votes. He was deemed elected on the 24th count having exceeded the quota with 9,023 votes.

In his contributions to date he has emphasised issues such as opposition to abortion, protections for the victims of human trafficking, support for improved end-of-life care in hospitals, maintaining Ireland's commitment to Overseas Development Aid, and social welfare protection for the economically vulnerable. Mullen is also member of the Joint Committees on Social Protection as well as the Joint Committee on European Affairs. Mullen has also supported the extension of the franchise for senatorial elections to all university graduates.

Mullen's campaign manager for the Seanad elections in 2007 and 2011 was Dr Andrew O'Connell, Irish Catholic columnist and communications director with the Presentation Brothers, and former board member of the conservative Catholic organisation the Iona Institute.

Mullen was re-elected to the Seanad at the 2020 election, topping the poll with 9,642 first preference votes on the first count.

=== Activities involving right-to-life issues ===
In November 2008, Mullen introduced the Stem Cell Research (Protection of Human Embryos) Bill in the Seanad. The bill sought to protect the right to life of human embryos in the context of embryo stem cell research.

In September 2010, Mullen introduced the first ever private members' motion in the Oireachtas dedicated to the issue of hospice care. The motion focused primarily on facilitating personal choice on dying at home and also on making end-of-life care a core hospital competence. The motion was based on the Irish Hospice Foundation's Audit of End of Life Care. The audit documented that over half the 1000 patients profiled died in multi-bed rooms, only 20-30% of persons received specialist palliative care, and that as many as 25% may have died alone. Speaking to the motion Mullen claimed that "implicit sometimes in our thinking on this issue is the view that policy focus should centre on those with the majority of their lives ahead of them; that dying is a taboo subject better skirted around for the sake of avoiding awkwardness and offence; and that as people gradually lose memory, consciousness, bodily control and even hope, they also lose their dignity".

Mullen involved in a controversy in April 2012, when he was accused by abortion rights activists of being "extremely unsympathetic" at a meeting with women who recently travelled outside Ireland to have their pregnancies terminated after they were diagnosed with abnormalities "incompatible with life". Mullen rejected the accusations and said he sympathised with the women. In November 2012 The Irish Times printed an apology to Senator Mullen because their original account of the meeting was "not complete and was unfair to Senator Mullen". Senator Mullen was contacted by an Irish Times reporter who accepted his invitation to revert to him if any specific allegations were made [to the journalist] about what was said by Senator Mullen at a meeting between Senator Mullen and a lobbyist on the issue of the legalisation of abortion. A specific allegation was made and was reported in the Irish Times article but it was not put to Senator Mullen beforehand. This led to a disputed version of events being reported.

In December 2012, Mullen expressed his sympathy with the victims of the Sandy Hook shooting but warned that his colleagues should "not slip into a double-think where we forget a whole category of children in our own country", in reference to proposed legislation on abortion and comments made by Frances Fitzgerald, the Minister for Children and Youth Affairs, with regards the A, B and C v Ireland. His comments drew criticism from colleagues including Seanad leader Maurice Cummins and Susan O'Keefe who described them as "disgraceful."

In a TV3 debate prior to the referendum on repealing the 8th amendment to the Irish constitution in 2018, Mullen said that "mental health has no evidence base". When the host of the show summarized his views as saying that "mental health is not health", Mullen replied, "You’re misrepresenting me." A petition calling for his resignation because of these remarks attracted almost 30,000 signatures within a week.

=== Same-sex marriage ===
During the Committee Stage debate in the Seanad on the Civil Partnership Bill 2009, Mullen and Senator Feargal Quinn tabled 77 amendments. Mullen spoke at length on amendments dealing with freedom of conscience in what Government Senators claimed was an attempt to obstruct the Bill. For the first time in two decades the Cathaoirleach then closed the committee stage debate, after less than ten hours of discussion. Mullen denied the filibuster claim, describing the cloture as "an attack on democracy".

However, other senators claimed that Mullen was attempting to stifle the bill through repetition and filibuster, that the debate "had developed into an exercise in absurdity. It had become meaningless and futile due to arguments which did not relate to tabled amendment." Labour Senator Ivana Bacik said that no one wanted to stifle debate. "What we have seen today in the last four hours is not genuine debate but an attempt to obstruct and to filibuster the passing of this important legislation, with which the vast majority of the House are agreed." He had earlier alleged that there was a lack of scrutiny given to the Bill in the Dáil. The Sunday Business Post noted that personalised attacks on opponents of the Bill, including Mullen, were an unusual feature of the Seanad debate.

In 2015, Mullen was a leading opponent of the proposal to amend the Irish Constitution to allow same-sex marriage. The amendment was accepted by voters on 22 May 2015 by 62% to 38%. The turnout of 1,949,725 voters was the highest referendum poll in the history of the State up to that time.

=== European Union ===
In the aftermath of the defeat in referendum of the first Lisbon Treaty Mullen was appointed to a sub-committee on European Affairs charged with investigating the political impasse. Mullen dissented from the Sub-Committee's final report, citing the Sub-Committee's failure to take seriously potential clashes between EU law and Irish Constitutional law on socio-ethical issues as his reason for doing so. Mullen proposed that in order for the Lisbon Treaty to be passed by a referendum legally binding guarantees would have to be attached to the Treaty re-affirming sovereignty with regard to Ireland's Constitutional position on the right to life of unborn children, the family, education and religion. He also proposed that both European law and the Constitution of Ireland incorporate such limits to prevent "competence creep" in the future. The suggestion concerning legally-binding guarantees was eventually taken up by the Irish Government in its negotiations with the EU in preparation for a second attempt at a referendum. By the time of the second Lisbon referendum the Government had secured the guarantees but no other constitutional amendment was proposed as part of the plebiscite. The Treaty of Lisbon passed at the second time of asking by 67.1% in favour to 32.9% against.

=== Blasphemy ===
Mullen voted against the 2009 Blasphemy Law saying it did not protect arguments that a reasonable person would see as being of religious value against accusations of blasphemy, unlike the protection it afforded to literary, artistic, political, scientific or academic value. He opposed the removal of the Constitutional ban on blasphemy both in the Seanad and in the subsequent referendum campaign. Mullen argued that it was an unnecessary waste of public money which would further encourage wasteful referendums. He also noted that retaining what he saw as reasonable blasphemy laws would carry more weight if Ireland wanted to influence countries like Pakistan to adopt less harsh blasphemy laws.

=== Other issues ===
In June 2009, Mullen introduced a private members' motion on human trafficking calling for, among other things, criminalising the user of prostituted and trafficked women. The motion was based on legislation in place in Sweden and Norway and received the support of NGOs such as Ruhama and the Immigrant Council of Ireland. Green Party Senator Déirdre de Búrca abstained from voting with the Government as a show of support for Mullen's motion.

He was once quoted as saying he did not believe the Irish government should get involved in the rehabilitation of a schismatic British bishop, Richard Williamson, who denied the holocaust.

== Council of Europe ==
In January 2010, Mullen replaced the late Deputy Tony Gregory as an independent member of the Irish parliamentary delegation to the Council of Europe in Strasbourg, where he joined the European People's Party (Christian Democrat) group, the largest political group represented in the Council of Europe. He became the first NUI Senator to be appointed to the Council of Europe, and only the second Independent Senator to be appointed. Mullen was a member of the Committee on Migration, Refugees and Population and an alternate member of the Social, Health and Family Affairs Committee. He ceased to be a member of the Irish parliamentary delegation in January 2011.

With other members Mullen tabled amendments to restrict access to abortion, and was also vocal on behalf of migrants' human rights, freedom of conscience and victims of human trafficking in the council. In October 2010 Mullen together with the Chairperson of the European People's Party at the Council of Europe, Luca Volontè, led the way in pushing through 29 amendments to the McCafferty Report. The McCafferty Report initially intended to severely restrict the right of medical staff to refuse to participate in procuring an abortion, but in the end was transformed into a resolution affirming the right to conscientiously object to abortion. Christine McCafferty, a former British MP and main author of the original resolution, said during deliberations that she sought to force private and religious hospitals and clinics to perform abortions. The report was widely expected to carry in its original form. The report was eventually entitled "The right to conscientious objection in lawful medical care".

== 2014 European Parliament election ==
Mullen ran as an independent candidate in the Midlands–North-West constituency for the 2014 European Parliament election. He received 5.6% of the votes and failed to be elected.

== Human Dignity Alliance ==
Mullen formed the Human Dignity Alliance as a new political party in June 2018. The party is anti-abortion and was founded in the aftermath of the abortion referendum. The party is registered to contest Dáil, European and local elections and Mullen has stated they are interested in hearing from prospective candidates.

== Other interests ==
Mullen is a fluent Irish speaker and contributes regularly to RTÉ Raidió na Gaeltachta and TG4, Ireland's Irish language radio and television channels, as well as on other Irish-language TV and Radio programmes. He has appeared frequently to review newspapers on the independent radio channel Newstalk.

Mullen is a member of the Board of Directors of CEIST (Catholic Education Irish Schools Trust) Ltd, a trust body for over 100 secondary schools around Ireland, including his former school, Holy Rosary College in Mountbellew. He is also a member of the Corporate Board of Management of Daughters of Charity Community Services, an education and community development agency in Dublin's inner city. He is a first cousin of former Fine Gael Senator Michael Mullins.
