= National University of Ireland (constituency) =

University constituency in Ireland

- Seanad Éireann constituency

Current constituency
- Created: 1938
- Seats: 3
- Senators: Alice-Mary Higgins (Ind); Michael McDowell (Ind); Rónán Mullen (Ind)

National University of Ireland (NUI) is a university constituency in Ireland, which elects three senators to Seanad Éireann, the senate of the Oireachtas (the legislature of Ireland). The electorate is composed of graduates of the university and its constituent universities.

The university constituency formerly elected members to the House of Commons of the United Kingdom (1918–1921), to the House of Commons of Southern Ireland (1921), and to the Dáil Éireann (1922–1937).

== Representation ==
From	To	Chamber	Members
1918	1922	House of Commons of the United Kingdom / First Dáil	1
1921	1922	House of Commons of Southern Ireland / Second Dáil	4
1922	1923	3rd Dáil	4
1923	1937	Free State Dáil	3
1938	—	Seanad Éireann	3

=== House of Commons of the United Kingdom ===
National University of Ireland
- Former university constituency for the House of Commons

1918–1922

Under the Redistribution of Seats (Ireland) Act 1918, NUI was enfranchised as a new university constituency and continued to be entitled to be represented by one Member of Parliament in the British House of Commons until the dissolution of Parliament on 26 October 1922, shortly before the Irish Free State became a dominion outside the United Kingdom on 6 December 1922. In 1918 the electorate included all registered male graduates over 21 (or over 19 if in the armed services) and all female graduates over 30. There were 3,819 voters registered for the 1918 general election. Most, if not all, of those electors would have been plural voters also entitled to vote in a territorial constituency. The 1918 general election took place on 14 December and the results were declared on 28 December, except for the university constituencies. NUI voted between 18 and 22 December and the result was declared on 23 December. Eoin MacNeill was elected (and also for Londonderry City) standing for Sinn Féin and therefore did not take his seat in Westminster, instead serving as a member of the first Dáil Éireann.

=== House of Commons of Southern Ireland ===
The Government of Ireland Act 1920 established a devolved home rule legislature, within the United Kingdom, for twenty-six Irish counties which were designated Southern Ireland. NUI was given four seats in the House of Commons of Southern Ireland. At the 1921 Southern Ireland House of Commons election, all 128 seats were elected unopposed. Of these, 124 were Sinn Féin members, who formed the TDs of the Second Dáil. This included the four representatives of the NUI.

The Parliament was dissolved as part of the arrangements under the Anglo-Irish Treaty in 1922.

=== Dáil Éireann ===
National University of Ireland
- Former Dáil Éireann; Parliamentary constituency

Former constituency
- Created: 1922
- Abolished: 1937
- Seats: 4 (1922–1923); 3 (1923–1937)

In the 1918 general election, Sinn Féin contested the election on the basis that they would not take seats in the United Kingdom Parliament but would establish a revolutionary assembly in Dublin.

The university was, in Irish republican theory, entitled to return one Teachta Dála (known in English as a Deputy) in 1918 to serve in the Irish Republic's First Dáil. This revolutionary body assembled on 21 January 1919. In republican theory every MP elected in Ireland was a member of the First Dáil. In practice only Sinn Féin members participated, including the Deputy for the university.

In May 1921, elections were held to the parliaments established under the Government of Ireland Act 1920. Sinn Féin had decided to use the polls for the House of Commons of Northern Ireland and the House of Commons of Southern Ireland together as an election for the Irish Republic's Second Dáil. At the last meeting of the First Dáil on 10 May 1921, it passed a motion, the first three parts of which expressed this constitutional position.

1. That the parliamentary elections which are to take place during the present month be regarded as elections to Dáil Éireann.
2. That all deputies duly returned at these elections be regarded as members of Dáil Éireann and allowed to take their seats on subscribing to the proposed Oath of Allegiance.
3. That the present Dáil dissolve automatically as soon as the new body has been summoned by the President and called to order.

No voting occurred in Southern Ireland as all the seats were filled by unopposed returns. Except for Dublin University all constituencies outside Northern Ireland elected Sinn Féin TDs. The Second Dáil first met on 16 August 1921, thereby dissolving the First Dáil. The 3rd Dáil was also elected under the constituencies established by the Government of Ireland Act 1920. On 6 December 1922, this became the house of representatives of the new Irish Free State.

From the Electoral Act 1923 the Irish Free State defined its own Dáil constituencies. National University of Ireland was reduced to three seats. This Act abolished plural voting for University constituencies and enfranchised women on the same terms as men. Qualified voters could register for a university or a territorial constituency but not for both. The qualifications for an elector to be registered as a university voter were set out in Section 1(2)(c) of the 1923 Act. They were to be registered at "the University constituency comprising a university in which he or she has received a degree other than an honorary degree".

The Constitution (Amendment No. 23) Act 1936 repealed provisions of the Constitution of the Irish Free State providing for University representation in Dáil Éireann, with effect from the next dissolution of the Oireachtas which took place on 14 June 1937. The seat left vacant by Conor Maguire in 1936 on his appointment to the High Court was not filled.

==== TDs ====
Teachtaí Dála (TDs) for National University of Ireland 1918–1937{{{refs}}}
Key to parties: SF = Sinn Féin; PT-SF = Sinn Féin (Pro-Treaty); AT-SF = Sinn Féin (Anti-Treaty); CnaG = Cumann na nGaedheal; FF = Fianna Fáil; Ind. = Independent
Dáil	Election	Deputy (Party)	Deputy (Party)	Deputy (Party)	Deputy (Party)
1st	1918	Eoin MacNeill (SF)	1 seat under 1918 Act		
2nd	1921	Eoin MacNeill (SF)	Ada English (SF)	Michael Hayes (SF)	William Stockley (SF)
3rd	1922	Eoin MacNeill (PT-SF)	William Magennis (Ind.)	Michael Hayes (Note: Michael Hayes served as Ceann Comhairle from 9 September 1922 to 29 January 1932.) (PT-SF)	William Stockley (AT-SF)
4th	1923	Eoin MacNeill (CnaG)	William Magennis (CnaG)	Michael Hayes (CnaG)	3 seats from 1923
4th	1923 by-election	Patrick McGilligan (CnaG)	William Magennis (CnaG)	Michael Hayes (CnaG)	3 seats from 1923
5th	1927 (Jun)	Patrick McGilligan (CnaG)	Arthur Clery (Ind.)	Michael Hayes (CnaG)	3 seats from 1923
6th	1927 (Sep)	Patrick McGilligan (CnaG)	Michael Tierney (CnaG)	Michael Hayes (CnaG)	3 seats from 1923
7th	1932	Patrick McGilligan (CnaG)	Conor Maguire (FF)	Michael Hayes (CnaG)	3 seats from 1923
8th	1933	Patrick McGilligan (CnaG)	Conor Maguire (FF)	Helena Concannon (FF)	3 seats from 1923
8th	1936	Patrick McGilligan (CnaG)	(Vacant)	Helena Concannon (FF)	3 seats from 1923

Note: The columns in this table are used only for presentational purposes, and no significance should be attached to the order of columns. For details of the order in which seats were won at each election, see the detailed results of that election.

=== Seanad Éireann ===
Article 18.4 of the Constitution of Ireland adopted in 1937, provided that the National University of Ireland would have three seats in the new Seanad Éireann. The Seanad Electoral (University Members) Act 1937 gave effect to this constitutional provision, with graduates of the National University of Ireland entitled to elect Senators by single transferable vote. The first Seanad election took place in 1938, and thereafter elections to the Seanad take place within 90 days of the dissolution of the Dáil. The Seventh Amendment, adopted in 1979, allows for a redistribution of the six university seats among the Dublin University, the National University of Ireland, and any other institutions of higher education in the State which do not have representation. The establishment of separate universities from the NUI Colleges was under consideration in the late 1970s, and the Seventh Amendment was introduced so that the reference to the NUI in the Constitution would not inhibit any reforms and graduates of NUI and ex-NUI institutions could elect senators. Ultimately the NUI was not abolished (but reformed to be a federal institution).

Graduates who are Irish citizens are required to register to vote and the election is conducted by postal vote. There is no residency requirement for voters, so those living abroad can participate. Political party labels do not appear on Seanad election ballot papers.

Under the Seanad Electoral (University Members) (Amendment) Act 2024, the 2025 Seanad election to the 27th Seanad was the last general election for the National University constituency and the Dublin University constituency. At Seanad general elections held after 31 March 2025, the two university constituencies will be substituted by a new six-seat Higher Education constituency, enfranchising graduates from all institutions of higher education recognised under the Higher Education Act 2022. If a vacancy occurs during the 27th Seanad in the National University constituency, the electorate will be NUI graduates on the Higher Education constituency register of electors.

Senators for National University of Ireland 1938–present
Key to parties: FF = Fianna Fáil; FG = Fine Gael; Lab = Labour; Ind. = Independent
Sen	Election	Senator (Party)	Senator (Party)	Senator (Party)
2nd	1938	Henry Barniville (FG)	Helena Concannon (FF)	Michael Tierney (FG)
3rd	1938	Henry Barniville (FG)	Helena Concannon (FF)	Michael Tierney (FG)
4th	1943	Henry Barniville (FG)	Helena Concannon (FF)	Michael Tierney (FG)
5th	1944	Henry Barniville (FG)	Helena Concannon (FF)	Michael Ryan (Ind.)
6th	1948	Henry Barniville (FG)	Helena Concannon (FF)	George O'Brien (Ind.)
7th	1951	Henry Barniville (FG)	Helena Concannon (FF)	George O'Brien (Ind.)
7th	1953	Henry Barniville (FG)	John Cunningham (Ind.)	George O'Brien (Ind.)
8th	1954	Henry Barniville (FG)	Roger McHugh (Ind.)	George O'Brien (Ind.)
9th	1957	Henry Barniville (FG)	Patrick Quinlan (Ind.)	George O'Brien (Ind.)
10th	1961	Dónall Ó Conalláin (Ind.)	Patrick Quinlan (Ind.)	George O'Brien (Ind.)
11th	1965	Dónall Ó Conalláin (Ind.)	Patrick Quinlan (Ind.)	Bryan Alton (Ind.)
12th	1969	John Horgan (Lab)	Patrick Quinlan (Ind.)	Bryan Alton (Ind.)
13th	1973	John Horgan (Lab)	Patrick Quinlan (Ind.)	Augustine Martin (Ind.)
14th	1977	Gemma Hussey (Ind.)	John A. Murphy (Ind.)	Augustine Martin (Ind.)
15th	1981	Gemma Hussey (FG)	John A. Murphy (Ind.)	Brendan Ryan (Ind.)
16th	1982	James Dooge (FG)	John A. Murphy (Ind.)	Brendan Ryan (Ind.)
17th	1983	James Dooge (FG)	Michael D. Higgins (Lab)	Brendan Ryan (Ind.)
18th	1987	Joe O'Toole (Ind.)	John A. Murphy (Ind.)	Brendan Ryan (Ind.)
19th	1989	Joe O'Toole (Ind.)	John A. Murphy (Ind.)	Brendan Ryan (Ind.)
20th	1993	Joe O'Toole (Ind.)	Feargal Quinn (Ind.)	J. J. Lee (Ind.)
21st	1997	Joe O'Toole (Ind.)	Feargal Quinn (Ind.)	Brendan Ryan (Ind.)
22nd	2002	Joe O'Toole (Ind.)	Feargal Quinn (Ind.)	Brendan Ryan (Lab)
23rd	2007	Joe O'Toole (Ind.)	Feargal Quinn (Ind.)	Rónán Mullen (Ind.)
24th	2011	John Crown (Ind.)	Feargal Quinn (Ind.)	Rónán Mullen (Ind.)
25th	2016	Michael McDowell (Ind.)	Alice-Mary Higgins (Ind.)	Rónán Mullen (Ind.)
26th	2020	Michael McDowell (Ind.)	Alice-Mary Higgins (Ind.)	Rónán Mullen (Ind.)
27th	2025	Michael McDowell (Ind.)	Alice-Mary Higgins (Ind.)	Rónán Mullen (Ind.)

Note: The columns in this table are used only for presentational purposes, and no significance should be attached to the order of columns.

== Elections ==
*: Outgoing Senator/TD

=== 2025 election ===
2025 Seanad election: National University of Ireland
Party	Candidate	FPv%	Count							
Party	Candidate	FPv%	1	2	3	4	5	6	7	8
Independent	Michael McDowell	31.5	11,390							
Independent	Rónán Mullen	20.6	7,452	8,175	8,259	8,376	8,461	8,643	8,783	9,107
Independent	Alice-Mary Higgins	19.0	6,872	7,350	7,411	7,497	7,560	7,671	7,809	8,822
Green	Eva Dowling	9.0	3,239	3,413	3,445	3,496	3,553	3,647	3,740	4,226
Independent	Rónán Collins	7.2	2,604	2,972	3,031	3,062	3,193	3,303	3,700	4,357
Independent	Linda O'Shea Farren	2.8	1,023	1,174	1,200	1,231	1,293	1,355	1,417	
Independent	Marie Keenan	2.8	1,009	1,108	1,124	1,171	1,206	1,282	1,360	
Independent	Dara Kilmartin	1.9	703	844	863	883	964	1,010		
Independent	Sandra Adams	1.7	597	669	680	715				
Independent	Michael O'Doherty	1.2	446	538	559	591				
Independent	Mairead Kenny	1.2	417	455	489					
Independent	Hilary Beirne	1.0	362	387						
Electorate: 112,832 Valid: 36,114 Spoilt: 37 Quota: 9,029 Turnout: 32%

=== 2020 election ===
2020 Seanad election: National University of Ireland
Party	Candidate	FPv%	Count															
Party	Candidate	FPv%	1	2	3	4	5	6	7	8	9	10	11	12	13	14	15	16
Independent	Rónán Mullen	25.2	9,642															
Independent	Michael McDowell	23.4	8,951	9,001	9,032	9,066	9,104	9,165	9,231	9,322	9,364	9,532						
Independent	Alice-Mary Higgins	12.9	4,944	4,953	4,962	4,972	4,995	5,024	5,060	5,103	5,145	5,271	5,400	5,723	6,156	6,710	7,487	9,778
Solidarity	Ruth Coppinger	9.5	3,615	3,619	3,625	3,630	3,650	3,677	3,697	3,715	3,753	3,851	3,962	4,168	4,363	4,804	5,196	6,219
Labour	Laura Harmon	5.7	2,187	2,189	2,194	2,204	2,227	2,252	2,279	2,310	2,385	2,470	2,563	2,721	3,072	3,385	4,333	
Independent	Michelle Healy	4.0	1,540	1,544	1,548	1,576	1,596	1,622	1,656	1,689	1,737	1,893	2,292	2,460	2,761	3,074		
Independent	Rory Hearne	3.5	1,321	1,328	1,332	1,353	1,367	1,401	1,428	1,475	1,514	1,555	1,622	1,776	1,949			
Green	Eva Dowling	3.2	1,229	1,231	1,247	1,259	1,284	1,298	1,329	1,354	1,400	1,459	1,497	1,622				
Independent	Brendan Price	2.9	1,090	1,097	1,101	1,110	1,120	1,142	1,179	1,195	1,205	1,294	1,378					
Independent	Mick Finn	2.4	908	913	919	922	942	957	963	981	994	1,079						
Independent	Anne Staunton Barrett	1.2	446	451	454	455	462	478	499	515	524							
Independent	Jennifer Butler	1.0	366	367	371	374	394	401	412	418	451							
Independent	Karen Devine	0.9	359	361	363	366	375	385	397	405								
Independent	Peter Finnegan	0.9	346	352	354	360	365	380	391									
Independent	Keith Scanlon	0.8	309	311	322	340	351	365										
Independent	Garbhan Downey	0.8	305	309	315	321	334											
Independent	Abbas Ali O'Shea	0.7	254	255	258	264												
Independent	Marcus Matthews	0.5	176	177	182													
Independent	Eoin Delahunty	0.3	130	130														
Electorate: 112,216 Valid: 38,118 Spoilt: 91 Quota: 9,530 Turnout: 34.1%

=== 2016 election ===
2016 Seanad election: National University of Ireland
Party	Candidate	FPv%	Count																											
Party	Candidate	FPv%	1	2	3	4	5	6	7	8	9	10	11	12	13	14	15	16	17	18	19	20	21	22	23	24	25	26	27	28
Independent	Rónán Mullen	20.3	7,362	7,369	7,372	7,404	7,412	7,425	7,444	7,474	7,495	7,569	7,583	7,628	7,655	7,719	7,790	7,826	7,873	7,934	7,980	8,006	8,075	8,316	8,596	8,855	9,016	9,368		
Independent	Michael McDowell	15.6	5,661	5,692	5,709	5,719	5,732	5,755	5,819	5,865	5,912	5,981	6,045	6,081	6,178	6,223	6,331	6,437	6,614	6,728	6,859	7,005	7,091	7,385	7,808	8,122	8,570	9,404		
Independent	Pádraig Ó Céidigh	6.8	2,475	2,484	2,493	2,517	2,522	2,532	2,547	2,580	2,601	2,643	2,665	2,703	2,756	2,788	2,871	2,932	3,172	3,249	3,313	3,372	3,433	3,618	3,961	4,217	4,513	4,915	5,035	5,595
Independent	Alice-Mary Higgins	5.7	2,055	2,059	2,070	2,074	2,091	2,131	2,150	2,160	2,185	2,218	2,265	2,309	2,368	2,424	2,481	2,554	2,602	2,682	2,837	3,026	3,336	3,476	3,656	3,922	4,636	5,261	5,375	7,803
Independent	David Begg	5.1	1,836	1,839	1,843	1,853	1,866	1,881	1,887	1,897	1,912	1,928	1,950	1,973	1,995	2,017	2,073	2,122	2,174	2,246	2,364	2,465	2,581	2,723	2,823	2,987	3,232			
Independent	Martin Khare Daly	4.2	1,523	1,575	1,578	1,590	1,591	1,595	1,605	1,615	1,630	1,669	1,685	1,719	1,734	1,757	1,787	1,823	1,873	1,900	1,943	1,961	2,000	2,089						
Labour	Laura Harmon	4.1	1,479	1,483	1,498	1,502	1,558	1,605	1,622	1,697	1,729	1,737	1,793	1,859	1,933	2,058	2,090	2,223	2,275	2,359	2,515	2,716	2,952	3,088	3,218	3,542	4,124	4,567	4,663	
Independent	Ellen O'Malley Dunlop	4.0	1,450	1,453	1,463	1,465	1,471	1,492	1,518	1,532	1,563	1,572	1,602	1,636	1,695	1,739	1,781	1,856	1,887	1,944	2,073	2,170	2,286	2,405	2,539	2,927				
Independent	Eddie Murphy	3.6	1,291	1,297	1,302	1,314	1,321	1,331	1,347	1,359	1,416	1,435	1,461	1,478	1,510	1,548	1,568	1,620	1,661	1,734	1,800	1,880	2,010	2,215	2,401					
Independent	Christy Kenneally	3.1	1,127	1,134	1,139	1,143	1,150	1,154	1,160	1,180	1,202	1,235	1,250	1,266	1,296	1,340	1,374	1,407	1,447	1,509	1,559	1,624	1,708							
Independent	Rory Hearne	2.3	837	838	842	850	860	877	897	900	928	935	952	1,001	1,028	1,083	1,093	1,126	1,142	1,208	1,276	1,451								
Independent	Kieran Rose	2.2	818	818	836	840	850	857	873	884	911	916	955	996	1,023	1,047	1,059	1,083	1,095	1,186	1,248									
Labour	Aideen Hayden	2.1	776	778	783	787	806	823	833	844	858	866	886	903	935	975	1,012	1,079	1,104	1,152										
Independent	Brendan Price	2.0	745	749	758	771	781	789	803	813	825	836	853	876	907	927	938	961	1,006											
Independent	Enda Ó Coineen	2.0	710	712	713	718	719	725	737	748	756	773	787	798	826	859	898	921												
Fine Gael	Pearce Flannery	1.8	645	646	648	649	650	652	662	671	676	736	748	763	773	783														
Independent	Deirdre Burke	1.7	610	617	618	621	629	652	668	673	687	700	719	734	756	785	885													
Independent	Máire Darker	1.6	599	599	601	610	619	636	643	654	665	675	682	707	729															
Independent	Carol Hunt	1.5	562	566	578	585	591	606	629	641	654	663	684	700																
Independent	Barry Johnston	1.4	515	515	521	523	529	532	544	549	559	560																		
Independent	John Higgins	1.3	480	481	483	487	488	490	494	502	506																			
Independent	Paddy Monahan	1.3	474	477	480	481	483	488	504	506	520	521																		
Independent	Paul D'Alton	1.2	430	431	437	442	443	452	461	468																				
Independent	Owen Joseph Dineen	1.0	372	374	375	380	397	399	403																					
Independent	Daragh McGreal	1.0	360	364	371	374	379	382																						
Independent	Karen Devine	0.9	321	323	328	329	331																							
Labour	Luke Field	0.7	242	242	245	248																								
Independent	Jerry Beades	0.5	196	197	199																									
Independent	Ross Golden Bannon	0.5	174	175																										
Independent	Michael Sean Molloy	0.5	168																											
Electorate: 103,154 Valid: 36,293 Spoilt: 355 Quota: 9,074 Turnout: 35.2%

=== 2011 election ===
2011 Seanad election: National University of Ireland
Party	Candidate	FPv%	%	Seat	Count
Independent	Rónán Mullen	6,459	19.1	1	24
Independent	John Crown	4,703	13.9	3	24
Independent	Feargal Quinn	4,591	13.6	2	24
Independent	Declan Kelleher	3,771	11.1		
Independent	Bernardine O'Sullivan	2,028	6.0		
Independent	Donncha O'Connell	1,629	4.8		
Fine Gael	Helen Keogh	1,362	4.0		
Fianna Fáil	Regina O'Connor	1,101	3.3		
Independent	Linda O'Shea Farren	1,083	3.2		
Workers and Unemployed	Paddy Healy	947	2.8		
Green	Niall Ó Brolcháin	718	2.1		
Independent	Brendan Price	671	2.0		
Independent	James Doorley	655	1.9		
Independent	Peter Mooney	547	1.6		
Sinn Féin	Eoin Ó Broin	490	1.4		
Independent	Michael Molloy	484	1.4		
Fianna Fáil	Paul Lynam	476	1.4		
Independent	Thomas Canning	354	1.1		
Independent	James Coyle	307	0.9		
Fine Gael	John Kennedy	279	0.8		
Independent	David McCurtin	262	0.8		
Independent	Francis O'Donnell	199	0.6		
Independent	Daniel K. Sullivan	193	0.6		
Independent	Diarmaid Ó Cadhla	182	0.5		
Independent	James O'Donoughue	154	0.5		
Independent	Mick Langan	129	0.4		
Independent	Matthias Cowley	57	0.2		
Electorate: ? Valid: 33,831 Quota: 8,458 Turnout:

=== 2007 election ===
2007 Seanad election: National University of Ireland
Party	Candidate	FPv%	Count																				
Party	Candidate	FPv%	1	2	3	4	5	6	7	8	9	10	11	12	13	14	15	16	17	18	19	20	21
Independent	Joe O'Toole	15.0	5,412	5,417	5,434	5,443	5,483	5,512	5,538	5,584	5,634	5,690	5,763	5,925	6,002	6,133	6,274	6,477	6,801	7,043	7,395	8,248	9,151
Independent	Rónán Mullen	12.9	4,661	4,665	4,676	4,683	4,709	4,760	4,765	4,802	4,843	4,902	4,969	5,037	5,156	5,317	5,622	5,807	5,980	6,152	6,506	7,091	8,013
Independent	Feargal Quinn	10.7	3,863	3,871	3,888	3,916	3,956	3,996	4,036	4,121	4,172	4,231	4,305	4,403	4,588	4,676	4,801	5,098	5,284	5,657	6,274	6,731	8,146
Labour	Brendan Ryan	9.1	3,283	3,304	3,324	3,332	3,360	3,378	3,430	3,463	3,512	3,584	3,656	3,726	3,795	3,949	4,110	4,333	4,623	5,145	5,346	5,956	7,307
Independent	Valerie Bresnihan	9.1	3,282	3,288	3,295	3,319	3,332	3,356	3,387	3,479	3,578	3,709	3,804	3,870	4,013	4,159	4,285	4,526	4,696	5,066	5,444	5,922	
Independent	Bernardine O'Sullivan	6.7	2,395	2,401	2,405	2,413	2,434	2,445	2,459	2,488	2,550	2,607	2,640	2,670	2,749	2,817	2,954	3,061	3,313	3,438	3,581		
Independent	John Hillery	4.8	1,734	1,742	1,750	1,769	1,794	1,808	1,817	1,831	1,881	1,916	1,949	2,089	2,145	2,188	2,189	2,253	2,319	2,386			
Workers and Unemployed	Paddy Healy	3.9	1,393	1,400	1,411	1,415	1,421	1,432	1,438	1,449	1,461	1,482	1,514	1,532	1,545	1,594	1,644	1,719					
Fine Gael	John Kennedy	3.6	1,303	1,312	1,318	1,329	1,339	1,351	1,374	1,410	1,428	1,449	1,491	1,522	1,563	1,602	1,632						
Independent	Brendan Price	3.6	1,289	1,301	1,319	1,331	1,343	1,359	1,412	1,447	1,482	1,539	1,669	1,705	1,767	1,901	1,998	2,109	2,220				
Independent	Dáithí Mac Cárthaigh	2.8	1,005	1,009	1,024	1,030	1,039	1,054	1,059	1,073	1,082	1,106	1,150	1,190	1,208	1,270							
Independent	Mark Garavan	2.6	951	952	955	967	973	998	1,007	1,016	1,028	1,054	1,108	1,129	1,149								
Fianna Fáil	Liam Crowley	2.3	814	819	820	824	830	833	841	856	885	894	897										
Independent	Susan Philips	2.0	706	708	709	715	726	741	751	797	834	882	916	940									
Green	Martin Hogan	1.9	683	685	690	707	715	728	749	772	796	824											
Independent	Martina Lowe	1.7	596	599	602	607	611	623	646	671	737												
Independent	Linda O'Shea Farren	1.6	563	563	568	576	585	591	610														
Independent	Mary O'Riordan	1.5	538	540	543	551	564	578	615	660													
Independent	Daniel K. Sullivan	1.0	372	375	381	384	391	399															
Independent	Oonagh Monahan	0.9	327	328	332	334	350																
Independent	Bernie O'Callaghan	0.9	305	310	315	322																	
Independent	Shane Brodbin	0.6	220	220	222																		
Fathers Rights	Liam Ó Gógáin	0.5	174	176																			
Independent	Mark Connolly	0.3	120																				
Electorate: ? Valid: 35,989 Spoilt: 1,023 Quota: 8,998

=== 2002 election ===
2002 Seanad election: National University of Ireland
Party	Candidate	FPv%	%	Seat	Count
Independent	Feargal Quinn	5,640	17.5	1	12
Independent	Joe O'Toole	5,463	16.9	2	13
Labour	Brendan Ryan	4,264	13.2	3	13
Independent	Bernardine O'Sullivan	4,054	12.6		
Independent	Valerie Bresnihan	2,856	8.9		
Independent	Brendan Price	2,035	6.3		
Independent	Linda O'Shea Farren	1,533	4.8		
Independent	Pierce Purcell	1,295	4.0		
Independent	Dáithí Mac Cárthaigh	1,273	4.0		
Fianna Fáil	Jim O'Callaghan	1,239	3.8		
Independent	Michael Griffin	961	3.0		
Independent	Matthew Harmey	590	1.8		
Communist	Noel Murphy	356	1.1		
Independent	Michael Cosgrave	273	0.9		
Independent	Colm O'Higgins	226	0.7		
Independent	Liam Ó Gógáin	191	0.6		
Electorate: 101,952 Valid: 32,249 Quota: 8,063 Turnout: 31.6%

=== 1997 election ===
1997 Seanad election: National University of Ireland
Party	Candidate	FPv%	%	Seat	Count
Independent	Joe O'Toole	7,492	22.0	1	6
Independent	Feargal Quinn	6,964	20.4	2	6
Independent	William Binchy	6,736	19.8		
Independent	Brendan Ryan	5,885	17.3	3	7
Independent	Tommy Francis	3,111	9.1		
Independent	Linda O'Shea Farren	1,601	4.7		
Independent	Eamon Ryan	972	2.8		
Independent	Ann Ó Cleirigh	873	2.6		
Independent	Brendan Price	444	1.3		
Electorate: ? Valid: 34,078 Quota: 8,520 Turnout:

=== 1993 election ===
1993 Seanad election: National University of Ireland
Party	Candidate	FPv%	%	Seat	Count
Independent	Joe O'Toole	6,073	17.4	2	12
Independent	Feargal Quinn	5,433	15.6	1	12
Independent	Brendan Ryan	4,346	12.5		
Independent	William Binchy	4,321	12.4		
Independent	J. J. Lee	3,638	10.4	3	14
Independent	Tommy Francis	2,900	8.3		
Independent	Anthony Clare	2,517	7.2		
Independent	Paul McNulty	2,063	5.9		
Independent	Joyce Andrews	953	2.7		
Independent	Anne Colgan	698	2.0		
Independent	Gerard Waters	596	1.7		
Independent	James Heffron	369	1.1		
Independent	Brendan Price	351	1.0		
Independent	Benedict Reid	305	0.9		
Independent	Bill Tormey	279	0.8		
Electorate: ? Valid: 34,842 Quota: 8,711 Turnout:

=== 1989 election ===
1989 Seanad election: National University of Ireland
Party	Candidate	FPv%	Count						
Party	Candidate	FPv%	1	2	3	4	5	6	7
Independent	Brendan Ryan	25.5	6,309	6,309	6,309	6,197	6,197	6,197	6,197
Independent	John A. Murphy	17.2	4,285	4,397	4,557	4,598	5,228	6,323	6,323
Independent	Joe O'Toole	16.4	4,073	4,157	4,278	4,304	4,721	5,042	6,596
Independent	Paul McNulty	9.6	2,377	2,447	2,574	2,584	2,984	3,633	4,265
Independent	Tommy Francis	9.1	2,249	2,325	2,397	2,405	2,667	2,841	
Independent	John McGilligan	9.0	2,225	2,272	2,397	2,405	2,667	2,841	
Independent	John Gormley	7.4	1,837	1,924	2,255	2,277			
Independent	Brendan Price	3.5	859	917					
Independent	Diarmuid Coogan	2.3	573						
Electorate: ? Valid: 24,787 Spoilt: 425 Quota: 6,197 Turnout: ?

=== 1933 election ===
1933 Dáil election: National University of Ireland
Party	Candidate	FPv%	Count	
Party	Candidate	FPv%	1	2
Fianna Fáil	Conor Maguire	34.6	1,306	
Cumann na nGaedheal	Patrick McGilligan	27.3	1,028	
Fianna Fáil	Helena Concannon	20.5	773	1,128
Cumann na nGaedheal	Michael Hayes	17.6	664	672
Electorate: 4,655 Valid: 3,771 Quota: 943 Turnout: 81.0%

Maguire vacated his seat in November 1936 on his appointment as a judge of the High Court. The seat remained vacant until the dissolution of the 8th Dáil on 14 June 1937.

=== 1932 election ===
1932 Dáil election: National University of Ireland
Party	Candidate	FPv%	Count
Party	Candidate	FPv%	1
Cumann na nGaedheal	Michael Hayes (Note: As outgoing Ceann Comhairle, Hayes was returned automatically under s. 2 of the Electoral (Amendment) Act 1927.)	N/A	Returned automatically
Fianna Fáil	Conor Maguire	44.3	1,396
Cumann na nGaedheal	Patrick McGilligan	42.2	1,332
Cumann na nGaedheal	Michael Tierney	13.5	426
Electorate: 4,200 Valid: 3,154 Quota: 1,052 Turnout: 75.1%

=== September 1927 election ===
September 1927 Dáil election: National University of Ireland
Party	Candidate	FPv%	Count	
Party	Candidate	FPv%	1	2
Cumann na nGaedheal	Michael Hayes (Note: As outgoing Ceann Comhairle, Hayes was returned automatically under s. 2 of the Electoral (Amendment) Act 1927. He was elected again as Ceann Comhairle on 11 October 1927, leaving the Cumann na nGaedheal parliamentary party.)	N/A	Returned automatically	
Cumann na nGaedheal	Patrick McGilligan	55.9	1,229	
Fianna Fáil	Conor Maguire	29.6	652	671
Cumann na nGaedheal	Michael Tierney	14.5	319	795
Electorate: 2,934 Valid: 2,200 Quota: 734 Turnout: 75.0%

=== June 1927 election ===
June 1927 Dáil election: National University of Ireland
Party	Candidate	FPv%	Count			
Party	Candidate	FPv%	1	2	3	4
Cumann na nGaedheal	Michael Hayes (Note: As outgoing Ceann Comhairle, Hayes was returned automatically under s. 2 of the Electoral (Amendment) Act 1927. He was elected again as Ceann Comhairle on 23 June 1927, leaving the Cumann na nGaedheal parliamentary party.)	N/A	Returned automatically			
Cumann na nGaedheal	Patrick McGilligan	50.7	1,090			
Independent	Arthur Clery	23.9	514	528	597	687
Cumann na nGaedheal	Eoin MacNeill	10.6	228	510	565	684
Independent	Agnes O'Farrelly	7.6	163	199	251	
Clann Éireann	William Magennis	7.2	155	196		
Electorate: 2,934 Valid: 2,150 Quota: 717 Turnout: 73.3%

=== 1923 by-election ===
Caused by the resignation of Eoin MacNeill.

1923 Dáil by-election: National University of Ireland
Party	Candidate	FPv%	Count
Party	Candidate	FPv%	1
Cumann na nGaedheal	Patrick McGilligan	76.5	849
Republican	William Stockley	23.5	261
Electorate: 1,567 Valid: 1,110 Quota: 556 Turnout: 70.8%

=== 1923 election ===
1923 Dáil election: National University of Ireland
Party	Candidate	FPv%	Count			
Party	Candidate	FPv%	1	2	3	4
Cumann na nGaedheal	Eoin MacNeill (Note: MacNeill also stood successfully for Clare and chose to sit for that constituency.)	34.8	418			
Cumann na nGaedheal	Michael Hayes (Note: Hayes also stood successfully for Dublin South but vacated that seat. He was elected as Ceann Comhairle on 9 September 1923, leaving the Cumann na nGaedheal parliamentary party.)	17.5	210	282	285	343
Cumann na nGaedheal	William Magennis	16.7	201	239	243	304
Republican	William Stockley	12.0	144	146	229	245
Independent	Agnes O'Farrelly	11.3	136	141	143	
Republican	Hugh Ryan	7.7	93	93		
Electorate: 1,561 Valid: 1,202 Quota: 301 Turnout: 77.0%

=== 1922 election ===
1922 Dáil election: National University of Ireland
Party	Candidate	FPv%	Count			
Party	Candidate	FPv%	1	2	3	4
Sinn Féin (Pro-Treaty)	Eoin MacNeill	33.7	888			
Independent	Arthur W. Conway	15.6	410	438	441	455
Independent	William Magennis	14.5	381	430	440	483
Sinn Féin (Anti-Treaty)	William Stockley	13.2	349	377	695	
Sinn Féin (Anti-Treaty)	Ada English	11.9	314	334		
Sinn Féin (Pro-Treaty)	Michael Hayes	11.2	294	529		
Electorate: 5,053 Valid: 2,636 Quota: 528 Turnout: 52.2%

=== 1921 election ===
1921 Southern Ireland House of Commons election: National University of Ireland (uncontested)
Party	Candidate
Sinn Féin	Ada English
Sinn Féin	Michael Hayes
Sinn Féin	Eoin MacNeill
Sinn Féin	William Stockley

Sinn Féin refused to recognise the Southern Ireland House of Commons and took their seats as TDs in the Second Dáil. The NUI registrar reported an expenditure of £28 14s on the election.

=== 1918 election ===
The 1918 general election took place on 14 December and the results were declared on 28 December, except for the university constituencies. NUI voted between 18 and 22 December and the result was declared on 23 December.

1918 Westminster election: National University of Ireland
Party	Candidate	Votes	%	±%
Sinn Féin	Eoin MacNeill	1,644	66.9	N/A
Irish Parliamentary	Arthur W. Conway	813	33.1	N/A
Majority		831	33.8	N/A
Turnout		2,457	64.3	N/A
Sinn Féin win (new seat)				

In common with other Sinn Féin MPs, Eoin MacNeill abstained from Westminster and took his seat as a TD in the First Dáil. He was also elected for Londonderry City.

== See also ==
- List of United Kingdom Parliament constituencies in Ireland and Northern Ireland
- List of MPs elected in the 1918 United Kingdom general election
- Historic Dáil constituencies
- Dáil Éireann (Irish Republic)
- Dublin University (constituency)
- Queen's University of Belfast (UK Parliament constituency)

== Sources ==
- Walker, Brian M., ed. (1978). Parliamentary Election Results in Ireland, 1801–1922. Dublin: Royal Irish Academy. p. 395. ISBN 0901714127.
