= Ireland, 1912–1985: Politics and Society =

1989 book by John Joseph Lee

- Author: J. J. Lee
- Language: English
- Genre: Non-fiction
- Published: November 1989; 37 years ago
- Publisher: Cambridge University Press
- Publication place: Republic of Ireland
- Pages: 754
- ISBN: 978-0521377416

Ireland, 1912–1985: Politics and Society is a book by Irish historian and politician J. J. Lee, published in 1989. It studies 20th-century Irish history, and emphasizes the influence of Irish cultural, social, and economic history on Irish national politics since home rule. The book was mostly well-received, and won several awards.

== Reception ==
Ireland, 1912–1985 was met by mostly positive reviews. Since its publication in November 1989, it was reprinted twice in 1990, and once again in 1991, 1992, 1993, 1995, 1998, and 2001.

In the United Kingdom and Ireland, the book was well received. In the Irish Journal of Sociology, Gearóid Ó Tuathaigh called it "an engaging and consistently original historical commentary." D. W. Harkness of Queen's University Belfast praised it as "witty, stimulating, and provocative" in The English Historical Review, but opined that the text showed "signs of haste" and "typographical errors." In History Workshop Journal, David Cairns lauded the book as "one of the most powerful analyses of any contemporary society that I have read." In Studies: An Irish Quarterly Review, published by the Irish Province of the Society of Jesus, Raymond Crotty called it "well written, well researched, and copiously referenced," and believed that its length was an "attraction... to the non-specialist."

In the United States and other countries, reception was also positive. In the American journal of British history Albion, University of Connecticut professor Paul M. Canning described it as "a perceptive and at times brilliant analysis of Ireland's performance as an independent nation," though he thought it could have used some "judicial pruning." In The American Historical Review, Virginia E. Glandon of the University of Missouri–Kansas City called the book "a critical survey of Irish society and politics." In the French-language Annales. Histoire, Sciences Sociales, François-Charles Mougel of the Institut d'études politiques de Bordeaux wrote that Ireland, 1912–1985 was "one of the first great syntheses on the history of the whole island in the twentieth century."

== Awards and honors ==
- 1991: The Irish Times/Aer Lingus Irish Literature Prize (Non-Fiction)
- 1991: Irish Life/Sunday Independent Arts Award (Prize for History)
- 1992: James S. Donnelly Sr. Prize for History and Social Sciences
