= J. J. Lee (historian) =

Irish historian and politician (born 1942)

- Born: John Joseph Lee; 9 July 1942 (age 84); Tralee, County Kerry, Ireland

Academic background
- Education: University College Dublin; Peterhouse, Cambridge

Academic work
- Discipline: Historian
- Institutions: University College Cork; New York University
- Notable works: The Modernisation of Irish Society, 1848–1918; Ireland, 1912–1985: Politics and Society

Senator
- In office 17 February 1993 – 17 September 1997
- Constituency: National University

Personal details
- Party: Independent

John Joseph Lee (born 9 July 1942) (commonly known as J. J. Lee), is an Irish historian and former senator. He has held the chairs of Modern History in University College Cork and Professor of History and Glucksman Professor for Irish Studies and Director of Glucksman Ireland House, at New York University.

== Biography ==
Born in Tralee, County Kerry, he spent his early years in Castlegregory in the same county. He also lived for some years in Ballinasloe, County Galway, where he attended national school. In 1954, he was awarded a Galway County Council scholarship to attend Gormanston College, County Meath.

He graduated in 1962 from University College Dublin with first-class honours in History and Economics. He completed his MA some years later on the history of the railways in nineteenth-century Ireland. He was also a graduate student of Peterhouse, Cambridge.

In 1973, he published The Modernisation of Irish Society, 1848–1918. The following year he moved back to Ireland to become Professor of Modern History at University College Cork, succeeding Oliver MacDonagh. He held the chair until 2002 when he took up his position at New York University. He retired in September 2017.

His 1989 Ireland, 1912–1985: Politics and Society won the Irish Independent/Irish Life prize for History in 1991; and both the Aer Lingus/Irish Times prize for Literature and the J.S. Donnelly, Snr. prize for History and Social Sciences in 1992.

He has been a member of the Royal Irish Academy since 1985.

In 1993, he was elected to the 20th Seanad as an independent member for the National University constituency.

== Works ==
- Lee, J.J.: The Modernisation of Irish Society, 1848–1918, Clarendon Press (1973), ISBN 0-717-14421-6
- Lee, J.J.: Ireland 1912–1985 - Politics and Society, Cambridge University Press (1989) ISBN 0-521-37741-2
- Lee, J.J. & Marion R. Casey: Making the Irish American: History and Heritage of the Irish in the United States,
  New York University Press (2006) ISBN 0-814-75218-7
