= Feargal Quinn =

Irish businessman, founder of Superquinn, later politician

- Quinn in 2009

Senator
- In office 17 February 1993 – 8 June 2016
- Constituency: National University

Personal details
- Born: 27 November 1936 Dublin, Ireland
- Died: 24 April 2019 (aged 82) Dublin, Ireland
- Party: Independent
- Other political affiliations: Independent Alliance
- Spouse: Denise Quinn
- Children: 5
- Relatives: Ruairi Quinn (cousin); Lochlann Quinn (cousin)
- Education: Newbridge College; University College Dublin

Feargal Quinn (27 November 1936 – 24 April 2019) was an Irish businessman, politician and television personality. He founded the Superquinn supermarket chain and served as a Senator for the National University constituency from 1993 to 2016.

== Early and personal life ==
Quinn was born in Dublin in 1936. His father, Eamonn, founded a grocery brand, and later the Red Island resort in Skerries. He was a first cousin of Labour Party politician Ruairi Quinn and of Lochlann Quinn, former chairman of Allied Irish Banks (AIB).

Quinn was educated at Holy Faith Secondary School, Clontarf, then with a mixed junior school, and Newbridge College, and was a commerce graduate of University College Dublin.

He was married to Denise, daughter of Ned and Grace Prendergast, and they had five children. He lived in the Baily area of Howth near Dublin, near the former head office of the Superquinn chain at Sutton.

== Business and public sector career ==
Quinn built a career in business and later took on a range of public service roles.

=== Supermarkets ===
Quinn founded the national supermarket chain, Superquinn (originally Quinn's Supermarkets), in Dundalk in 1960. As chairman of the company, he developed a reputation for having a high level of customer service compared to other supermarkets, and wrote a manual on customer service, "Crowning the Customer". He introduced a number of innovations to the Irish supermarket sector, including Ireland's first supermarket loyalty card in 1993, SuperClub (rebranded in 2007 as Reward Card).

On 26 August 2005, Superquinn was sold for around €450 million to a consortium called Select Retail Holdings, which had been formed in 2002. In the following years, it transpired that the company faced multiple market challenges as its shops had aged, competition had grown, and it lacked centralised distribution; Quinn was replaced as chairman but remained as non-executive President.

On 18 July 2011, it was announced that receivers had been appointed to the business. The following day, it was reported that the business had been sold to Musgrave Group for just over €100 million. All Superquinn shops were rebranded to SuperValu in 2014.

=== Public sector work ===
Quinn became the chairman of the Interim Board for Posts and served as chairman of its successor An Post (the State-owned Irish postal administration) until 1989. He also served on several other public authorities and boards. From 1993 to 1998, he chaired the steering committee which oversaw the development of the Leaving Certificate Applied.

In 2006, he was appointed an adjunct professor in marketing at NUI, Galway. He was also chairman of Springboard Ireland.

=== Business groups ===
He was a sometime former President of EuroCommerce, the Brussels-based organisation which represents the retail, wholesale and international trade sectors in Europe. He also served on the board of directors of CIES – the Food Business Forum based in Paris as well as the American-based Food Marketing Institute.

=== Television work ===
In 2009, he worked with independent shops and helped them to revamp, modernise and stave off stiff competition from multi-national retailers. It aired as RTÉ's six-part television series, Feargal Quinn's Retail Therapy. A second series aired in 2011, and a third series aired in 2012.

In 2011, he fronted RTÉ's Local Heroes campaign in Drogheda, County Louth which an assembled team of experts to kick-start the local economy. It aired as RTÉ 1's six-part television series, Local Heroes – A Town Fights Back.

== Political career ==
Quinn was first elected as a senator in 1993 from the National University constituency and was re-elected in 1997, 2002, 2007 and 2011. He was a member of the Joint Oireachtas Committee on European Affairs, the Joint Committee on Finance and Public Service and was an Oireachtas member of the National Economic and Social Forum, along with the Joint Committee on Jobs and Innovation.

During his time in Seanad Éireann he tabled many amendments to government Bills and introduced 17 Private Members Bills. The most successful of those was the Construction Contracts Bill 2010 – to protect building sub-contractors which was enacted as the Construction Contracts Act 2013 and was brought into force on 23 July 2016.

The proposals contained in several of his other Bills were implemented; for example, in the Irish Nationality and Citizenship and Ministers and Secretaries (Amendment) Bill 2003, Quinn sought to bring an end to the 'passports for sale' scheme. The following year, Quinn's proposal was enacted in the form of the Irish Nationality and Citizenship Act 2004.

A further example relates to the Social Welfare and Pensions (Amendment) Bill 2014 – a Senator Quinn Bill which sought to remove from Irish Water, the power to require its customers to provide their PPS numbers to the entity. Following the publication of the Bill, the Government announced that it had decided to "discontinue" the requirement for Irish Water customers to produce their PPS number. The Government subsequently amended the law to mirror Quinn's proposal.

Quinn was one of the co-founders and was a driving force behind Democracy Matters – a civil society group that was formed to oppose the Government's plans to abolish Seanad Éireann. In May 2013, with Senators Katherine Zappone and Mary Ann O'Brien, he introduced the Seanad Bill 2013 to reform the system of electing the elected members of Seanad Éireann (as provided for in Article 18.10 of the Constitution of Ireland) through a one-person, one vote franchise. The Seanad Bill 2013 succeeded in being passed at Second Stage in the Seanad. During the Seanad abolition referendum campaign, the Bill demonstrated to the electorate, in a very palpable way, that reform of the Seanad was achievable if they voted for its retention. In a referendum held in October 2013 on the Abolition of Seanad Éireann, the people voted to retain the Seanad by 51.7%.

In 2014, Quinn revealed that since being first elected to Seanad Éireann, he had donated his entire salary to charity and in more recent years he had refused to accept any salary.

In March 2015, he opposed the Marriage Equality bill in the Seanad, and voted 'No' in the referendum.

He was Chairman of the Independent Alliance. He did not contest the 2016 Seanad election.

== Publications ==
Quinn wrote Crowning the Customer (O'Brien Press, 1990), which has been translated into many languages, as well as Mind Your Own Business (O'Brien Press, 2013). In 2016, he published his memoirs, entitled "Quinnessential Feargal" (O'Brien Press 2016).

== Recognition ==
Quinn was the recipient of five honorary doctorates from education institutions (including NUI Galway in 2006), a papal knighthood along with a fellowship and the French Ordre National du Mérite. He shared with Oprah Winfrey the 2006 "Listener of the Year" award of the International Listening Association.

== See also ==
- Families in the Oireachtas
