= Patrick Quinlan (politician) =

Irish politician and academic (1919–2001)

Senator
- In office 22 May 1957 – 27 October 1977
- Constituency: National University

Personal details
- Born: 7 December 1919 County Limerick, Ireland
- Died: 8 November 2001 (aged 81) Cork, Ireland
- Party: Independent
- Spouse: Jane Healy (m. 1946)
- Children: 5

Patrick Michael Quinlan (7 December 1919 – 8 November 2001) was an Irish academic and member of Seanad Éireann from 1957 to 1977.

He was born near Kilfinane, County Limerick on 7 December 1919, to farmer Jeremiah Quinlan and his wife, Josephine (née Casey). He was educated at CBS Charleville in County Cork and at St Munchin's College in Limerick. In 1938, he attended University College Cork (UCC), where he studied civil engineering. He continued his studies at UCC in mathematical science, graduating with a B.Sc. (1942) and M.Sc. (1943).

He completed his PhD at California Institute of Technology in 1949. He was professor of mathematical physics at University College Cork. He was a member of the governing body of UCC, and a fellow of the Institute of Advanced Studies from 1971. In 1967, he was awarded a Higher Doctorate, the DSc from the National University of Ireland and in 1978, he was elected a member of the Royal Irish Academy. He was a founder member of the National Committee for Theoretical and Applied Mechanics in 1983.

He was elected to the 9th Seanad in 1957 for the National University constituency. He was re-elected to the Seanad in 1961, 1965, 1969 and 1973. He did not contest the 1977 Seanad election.

He authored many publications, including A Dynamic Model of the Irish Economy (1961), and The Edge Function Method (1968).

On 14 February 1946, Quinlan married a fellow UCC graduate, Jane Healy. They had one son and four daughters. He died on 8 November 2001 in Cork.
