= Brendan Ryan (Cork politician) =

Irish politician and chemical engineer (born 1946)

Senator
- In office 17 September 1997 – 13 September 2007
- In office 13 May 1982 – 17 February 1993
- Constituency: National University

Personal details
- Born: 6 August 1946 (age 79) County Kildare, Ireland
- Party: Labour Party; Independent

Brendan Ryan (born 6 August 1946) is an Irish politician and former member of Seanad Éireann for the National University constituency. He was an independent senator until 1999, when he joined the Labour Party.

== Career ==
Born in Athy, County Kildare, Ryan's political interest arises from his involvement in the 1970s and 1980s with the Simon Community, an organisation which works with and for homeless people.

=== Political career ===
He was first elected in 1981 to the 16th Seanad by graduates of the National University of Ireland in 1981, defeating Professor Augustine Martin. His election was welcomed by an editorial in The Irish Times as "one of the best deeds in a naughty world". The paper noted that "the graduates of the National University of Ireland, the privileged as many would see them, the people who have had the inestimable gift of university education, gave their vote to a man who had devoted his life wholeheartedly to the Simon Community – Mr. Brendan Ryan".

He was a member of the Senate from 1981 until his defeat at the 1993 election to the 20th Seanad. He was re-elected to the 1997 to the 21st Seanad, and was a member until he lost his seat in 2007.

In 2004, Ryan he stood as a Labour Party candidate in the European Parliament election for the South constituency, and in the 2002 general election, he stood in the Cork South-Central constituency. He was unsuccessful on both occasions.

In May 2006, he introduced the Genealogy and Heraldry Bill 2006 in Seanad Éireann which aimed to provide a sound legislative basis for the State's delivery of heraldic services.

=== Academic career ===
Ryan is a lecturer in Chemical Engineering at the Cork Institute of Technology. In 1995 he wrote "Keeping Us In The Dark", a book concerning censorship and freedom of information in Ireland. He also wrote a weekly column for the Evening Echo newspaper.

=== Personal life ===
Ryan is a fluent speaker of the Irish language.
