= Human Dignity Alliance =

Irish political party

Human Dignity Alliance Comhaontas Dhínit an Duine
- Chairperson: Rónán Mullen
- Founded: 29 June 2018
- Headquarters: 17 Claremont Drive, Dublin
- Ideology: Anti-abortion; Conservatism; Social conservatism Christian right
- Political position: Right-wing
- European affiliation: European Christian Political Party

Website
- hdalliance.ie

The Human Dignity Alliance (Irish: Comhaontas Dhínit an Duine) is a minor right-wing political party in Ireland. The party was founded in June 2018 by Senator Rónán Mullen.

== Background ==
Mullen, the party's founder, has served as an independent senator for the National University of Ireland constituency since 2007. In 2014 he contested the European Parliament election unsuccessfully in the Midlands-North-West constituency. Mullen was prominent in referendum campaigns opposing same-sex marriage in the 2015 referendum and abortion in the 2018 referendum. He is also a member of the European Christian Political Party.

== Foundation ==
The Human Dignity Alliance was born out of a political grouping within Leinster House that met annually. The party was established on 29 June 2018 in support of Mullen's pro-life position and was registered with the clerk of Dáil Éireann, to contest Dáil, European and local elections. Mullen predicted the party would be a "slow burner" and see growth over time. In July 2018, independent TD Mattie McGrath ruled out joining the Human Dignity Alliance.
