= Dónall Ó Conalláin =

Irish politician and teacher (1907–1987)

Senator
- In office 14 December 1961 – 5 November 1969
- Constituency: National University

Personal details
- Born: 1907 Dublin, Ireland
- Died: 7 December 1987 (aged 79–80) Dublin, Ireland
- Party: Independent

Dónall Ó Conalláin (1907 – 7 December 1987) was an Irish politician and secondary school teacher from Dublin. He was first elected to Seanad Éireann as an independent member in 1961 for the National University constituency. He was re-elected at the 1965 election. He did not contest the 1969 election.

He was president of the Association of Secondary Teachers, Ireland in 1951.
