= John A. Murphy =

Irish historian and politician (1927–2022)

- Murphy in 1971

Senator
- In office 25 April 1987 – 17 February 1993
- In office 27 October 1977 – 23 February 1983
- Constituency: National University

Personal details
- Born: 17 January 1927 Macroom, County Cork, Ireland
- Died: 28 February 2022 (aged 95) County Cork, Ireland
- Party: Independent
- Education: University College Cork

John Augustine Murphy (17 January 1927 – 28 February 2022) was an Irish historian and senator. He was professor of history at University College Cork (UCC).

== Biography ==
Murphy was born in Macroom, County Cork, and has said he was very bookish as a boy. He won a Cork County Council scholarship in 1945 to study history at UCC, and graduated in 1948 with a first-class honours degree and first place in both History and Latin. He was a founding member of UCC History Society (UCC Historical Society, as it was then) in his final year of university. He took an MA in Cork before taking up a teaching post at the diocesan seminary at Farranferris in Cork city.

After eleven years in Farranferris (1949–1960), he became an assistant lecturer at UCC. He was appointed Professor of Irish History in 1971, holding that chair until his retirement in 1990. His 1975 book Ireland in the Twentieth Century was one of the first surveys of contemporary Irish history.

From 1977 to 1982, and between 1987 and 1993, Murphy represented the National University constituency as an independent member of Seanad Éireann. As a senator, he was noted for his advocacy of political and cultural pluralism. Earlier he had been a supporter of Noël Browne's Mother and Child Scheme. Murphy, a socialist often linked to the Worker's Party and the Labour Party, was also noted as a sharp critic of Sinn Féin and the Provisional Irish Republican Army, to the point that Murphy was often cited as an "Anti-Republican". Originally advocating for Irish reunification in the 1960s, and protesting the introduction of internment of Republican prisoners in 1971 as well as the Emergency Powers Act of 1976, by the 1980s Murphy's position had switched to the view that "the national question" around Northern Ireland was little more than a border dispute. Murphy dismissed the Provisional IRA as nothing more than "armed Hibernianism" as well as "unworthy" of the term "Republicans", and aroused fury amongst the provisional movement when he publicly criticised the 1981 Irish hunger strike. In 1982, Murphy delivered a speech at Béal na mBláth to mark the 60th anniversary of Michael Collins’ death, and declared Irish reunification "was not worth the shedding of a single drop of blood". In the 1990s Murphy condemned John Hume for being willing to make overtures to Gerry Adams in seeking to end the Troubles peacefully.

An atheist and a secularist, Murphy criticised the role of the Catholic Church's clergy in Irish politics, and opposed their influence on the 1979 Family Planning Act (relating to the sale of contraceptives in Ireland) and the 1986 Divorce referendum. Despite his earlier progressive tendencies, on 13 May 2015, in the run up to the Irish marriage equality referendum, he wrote to The Irish Times, describing the proposed constitutional amendment to permit same-sex marriage as "grotesque nonsense".

Murphy died in Cork on 28 February 2022, at the age of 95. His father Thade was a Gaelic footballer, who represented the Cork county team.

== Works ==
- Murphy, John A. (1959). Justin MacCarthy, Lord Mountcashel, Commander of the First Irish Brigade in France. Cork: Cork University Press. ISBN 0-7171-0568-7.
- Murphy, John A. (1975). Ireland in the Twentieth Century. Dublin: Gill and Macmillan. ISBN 0-7171-0568-7.
- Murphy, John A.; O'Carroll, J. P. (eds), De Valera and his times, Cork University Press, 1983. ISBN 0-7171-0568-7
- Murphy, John A. (1995). The College : A history of Queen's/University College Cork, 1845-1995. Cork: Cork University Press. ISBN 1-85918-056-6.
- Murphy, John A. (1995). Cuimhne dhá laoch : MacCurtain and MacSwiney. Cork: Cork Public Museum, 1995. ISBN 978-1-898168-13-3.

== Sources ==
- "John A. Murphy is Cork Person of Year". University College Cork. 30 January 2006.
- Seán Ó Coileáin (11 May 2001). "Introductory Address delivered on the occasion of the conferring of the Degree of Doctor of Literature honoris causa on Professor John A. Murphy". University College Cork.
