= Augustine Martin =

Irish academic and writer (1935–1995)

Senator
- In office 1 June 1973 – 8 October 1981
- Constituency: National University

Personal details
- Born: Thomas Augustine Martin; 13 November 1935 County Leitrim, Ireland
- Died: 16 October 1995 (aged 59) Dublin, Ireland
- Party: Independent
- Spouse: Claire Kennedy (m. 1959)
- Children: 4
- Education: University College Dublin

Thomas Augustine Martin (13 November 1935 – 16 October 1995) was an Irish academic, Anglo-Irish scholar, teacher, writer, politician, broadcaster and literary critic. During his career he was professor of Anglo-Irish Literature at University College Dublin (UCD), chairman of the board of the Abbey Theatre, and a member of Seanad Éireann (the Irish senate) from 1973 to 1981.

== Biography ==
Augustine Martin was born in Ballinamore, County Leitrim in 1935. Initially educated at the local national school, he completed his secondary education at Cistercian College, Roscrea (CCR), a boarding school in County Tipperary where he captained the rugby team, was elected House Captain by the students and in his Leaving Certificate examination, scored an A in English, coming first in the country that year.

In 1953 he entered University College Dublin (UCD), where he took a Bachelor of Arts in 1957. He married Claire Kennedy (a radiologist) in 1959, and they had four children. He taught English and Irish at his old school (Cistercian College) while he completed his Master of Arts degree.

In 1964, he joined the English department of UCD as a lecturer specialising in Anglo-Irish literature and was subsequently involved with the redrawing of the English literature secondary school curriculum as a founder member of the Association for Teachers of English (ATE). During this period he edited the secondary school text books Exploring English (prose) and Soundings (poetry). In 1973, he competed his doctoral thesis on James Stephens.

He won a Jacob's Awards for broadcasting in 1968 for presenting Telefís Scoile programmes about English literature for RTÉ.

He succeeded Roger McHugh as Chair of Anglo-Irish Literature, at UCD in 1979.

In 1973, he was elected to Seanad Éireann (the Irish Senate) for the National University constituency, and re-elected in 1977 to serve until 1981. As a senator, he spoke for the arts and culture and was notably active in the opposition to the development of Wood Quay, a 900-year-old Viking settlement in Dublin.

In 1983, he was appointed to the board of the Abbey Theatre (the Irish national theatre), and in 1985 was appointed chairman. He was chairman of the Yeats International Summer School from 1978 to 1981, and subsequently founded the Yeats Winter School and the Joyce Summer School at Newman House.

Martin died on 16 October 1995, aged 59. At the time of his death he was working on a biography of the Irish poet, Patrick Kavanagh.

== Published works ==
His literary works include:

- An Anthology of short stories for Intermediate Certificate (1967), editor;
- Introducing English: An Anthology of Prose and Poems (Dublin: Gill & Macmillan 1970), editor;
- Winter's Tales from Ireland (Dublin: Gill & Macmillan 1970), editor;
- James Stephens, The Charwoman's Daughter (1972), introduction;
- James Stephens: A Critical Study, (Dublin: Gill and Macmillan 1977);
- ‘Eusebius McGreal’, Third Degree, 1, 2 (Dublin 1977);
- Anglo-Irish literature (Department of Foreign Affairs, 1980);
- Mary Lavin The House in Clewe Street, (London: Virgao Press 1987), afterword;
- W. B. Yeats, Collected poems, (London: Arena 1983, 1990) editor and introduction;
- The Genius of Irish prose [RTÉ Thomas Davis Lects.] (Mercier/RTÉ 1985);
- James Joyce : the artist and the labyrinth (1990), editor;
- Friendship (Dublin: Ryan 1990);
- The Collected Prose of James Clarence Mangan: Prose, 1832–1839 by James Clarence Mangan, Martin Van De Kamp, Jacques Chuto, and Augustine Martin (published post-humously in May 1997).

An anthology of his essays was published posthumously: Bearing witness: essays on Anglo-Irish edited by Anthony Roche (1996)
