= Ada English =

Irish politician and psychiatrist (1875–1944)

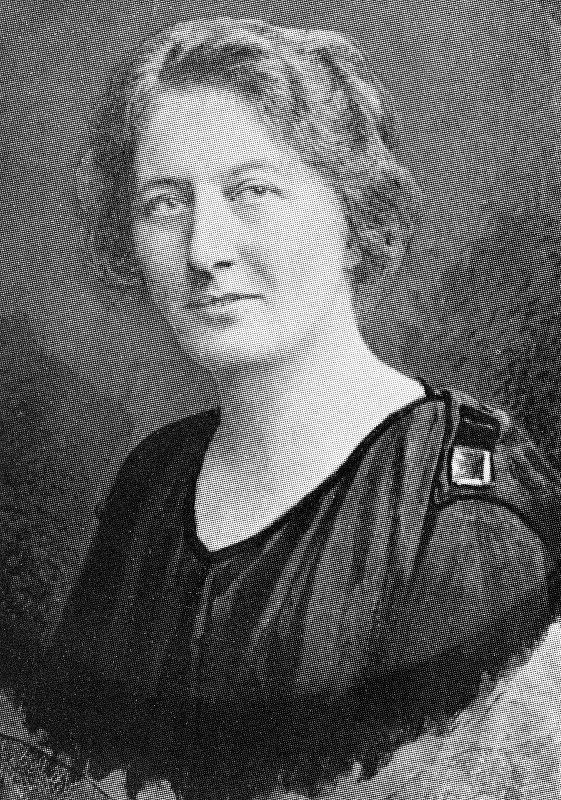

Teachta Dála
- In office May 1921 – June 1922
- Constituency: National University of Ireland

Personal details
- Born: Adeline English; 10 January 1875 Cahersiveen, County Kerry, Ireland
- Died: 27 January 1944 (aged 69) Ballinasloe, County Galway, Ireland
- Resting place: Creagh Cemetery, Ballinasloe
- Occupation: Politician; psychiatrist
- Other names: Eithne Inglis

Adeline English (Irish: Eithne Inglis; 10 January 1875 – 27 January 1944) was an Irish revolutionary politician and psychiatrist. English was dedicated to the reform of Ireland's large custodial psychiatric institutions throughout her life. She was a Sinn Féin TD in the Second Dáil from 1921 to 1922 for the National University of Ireland constituency. She voted against the Anglo-Irish Treaty in January 1922.

== Early life and family ==
English was born in Cahersiveen, County Kerry, to Patrick English and Nora McCardle of Mullingar, County Westmeath. She had four siblings, including two brothers, Pierce (who became a doctor in Castlerea) and Frank (who became a bank official). Her father was a pharmacist and a member of the Mullingar Town Commissioners while her grandfather, Richard, had been Master of the Old Castle Workhouse in the town.

== Medical career ==
She was educated at the Loreto Convent in Mullingar and graduated from the Royal University of Ireland (she attended Queen's College Galway) in 1903, reputedly as one of the first female psychiatrists in Ireland. She served at the Mater, Richmond, and Temple Street hospitals in Dublin. For a short period, she had an appointment at a London hospital before, in 1904, taking the position of assistant Resident Medical Superintendent (RMS) at the Lunatic Asylum (now St. Brigid's Hospital), in Ballinasloe, and also worked part-time in Castlerea Mental Hospital. She developed occupational therapy to a high degree and under her direction Ballinasloe was the first mental hospital in Ireland to use electric convulsive therapy. In October 1914, she was appointed to a lecturership in mental disease in University College Galway, a position she retained until February 1943. In 1921, she was offered the position of RMS of Sligo Mental Hospital by Austin Stack, Secretary of State for Home Affairs, but she decided to stay in Ballinasloe, where she was later appointed, in 1941, to the position of RMS. She retired from this position in December 1943.

== Political career ==
Through her contacts with people like Thomas MacDonagh, Patrick Pearse (who had once tutored her in the Irish language), Arthur Griffith and Liam Mellows, her belief in Irish nationalism grew and her rational and passionate arguments in its favour had a profound influence on the future Bishop of Clonfert, Dr. John Dignan, who arrived in Ballinasloe in the same year as English.

She was Medical Officer for the Irish Volunteers from its inception and worked at Athenry during the 1916 Rising. She was also a prominent member of Cumann na mBan. She was arrested in 1920 by Crown forces, spending six months in Galway Prison (she had been sentenced to nine months but was released due to food poisoning before completing her sentence).

In May 1921, she was elected unopposed to the Second Dáil for the NUI constituency as a Sinn Féin representative.

She voted against the Anglo-Irish Treaty, voicing her opposition to it in the Dáil on 4 January 1922. She began by stating her opposition to the position of the British monarch in the agreement:

I credit the supporters of the Treaty with being as honest as I am, but I have a sound objection to it. I think it is wrong; I have various reasons for objecting to it, but the main one is that, in my opinion, it was wrong against Ireland, and a sin against Ireland. I do not like talking here about oaths. I have heard about oaths until my soul is sick of them, but if this Treaty were forced on us by England — as it is being forced — and that paragraph 4, the one with the oath in it were omitted, we could accept it under force; but certainly, while those oaths are in it, oaths in which we are asked to accept the King of England as head of the Irish State, and we are asked to accept the status of British citizens — British subjects — that we cannot accept. As far as I see the whole fight in this country for centuries has centred round that very point. We are now asked not only to acknowledge the King of England's claim to be King of Ireland, but we are asked to swear allegiance and fidelity in virtue of that claim ... Ireland has been fighting England and, as I understood it, the grounds of this fight always were that we denied the right of England's King to this country.

She was also one of the few speakers to voice her opposition to the partition of Ireland:

The evacuation of the English troops is one of the things that are being held up to us as being one of the very good points in the Treaty. It would be a very desirable thing, indeed, that the English troops evacuated this country if they did evacuate it, but I hold that Ulster is still part of Ireland and I have not heard a promise that the British troops are to evacuate Ulster. They are still there. I understand they are to be drawn from the rest of Ireland and, as I read the Treaty, there is not one word of promise in it about the evacuation of the British troops.

In the course of the same speech, she also explained that she had been elected as an Irish republican and would remain so:

I credit my constituents with being honest people, just as honest as I consider myself — and I consider myself fairly honest — they sent me here as a Republican Deputy to An Dáil which is, I believe, the living Republican Parliament of this country. Not only that, but when I was selected as Deputy in this place I was very much surprised and, after I got out of jail, when I was well enough to see some of my constituents, I asked them how it came they selected me, and they told me the wanted someone they could depend on to stand fast by the Republic, and who would not let Galway down again. That is what my constituents told me they wanted when they sent me here, and they have got it.

She also rejected the claim made by male supporters of the Treaty that women were opposed to it for emotional reasons:

I think that it was a most brave thing to-day to listen to the speech by the Deputy from Sligo [referring to Alexander McCabe] in reference to the women members of An Dáil, claiming that they only have the opinions they have because they have a grievance against England, or because their men folk were killed and murdered by England's representatives in this country. It was a most unworthy thing for any man to say here. I can say this more freely because, I thank my God, I have no dead men to throw in my teeth as a reason for holding the opinions I hold. I should like to say that I think it most unfair to the women Teachtaí because Miss MacSwiney had suffered at England's hands.

She stood again for the National University of Ireland at the 1922 general election for the 3rd Dáil but lost her seat, being succeeded by the independent William Magennis. She assisted the Anti-Treaty IRA during the Irish Civil War and reportedly served with Cathal Brugha in the Hamman Hotel in Dublin in July 1922. She maintained her opposition to the Treaty and refused to recognise the legitimacy of the Irish Free State. Along with other members of the Second Dáil who opposed the Treaty, she played a part in Comhairle na dTeachtaí during the 1920s which saw itself as the true government of the Irish Republic.

She died on 7 January 1944 in Ballinasloe and is buried in Creagh Cemetery.

== Sources ==
- "Death of Dr Ada English". East Galway Democrat. 29 January 1944.
- "Ada English". Connacht Tribune. 29 January 1944.
- Declan Kelly, Between the Lines of History, People of Ballinasloe, Vol. 1, Ballinasloe: Declan Kelly, 2000, pp. 24–26.
- Kelly, Brendan (13 October 2014). "The lady vanishes: Dr Ada English, patriot and psychiatrist". The Irish Times.

Dáil	Election	Deputy (Party)	Deputy (Party)	Deputy (Party)	Deputy (Party)
1st	1918	Eoin MacNeill (SF)	1 seat under 1918 Act		
2nd	1921	Eoin MacNeill (SF)	Ada English (SF)	Michael Hayes (SF)	William Stockley (SF)
3rd	1922	Eoin MacNeill (PT-SF)	William Magennis (Ind.)	Michael Hayes (Note: Michael Hayes served as Ceann Comhairle from 9 September 1922 to 29 January 1932.) (PT-SF)	William Stockley (AT-SF)
4th	1923	Eoin MacNeill (CnaG)	William Magennis (CnaG)	Michael Hayes (CnaG)	3 seats from 1923
4th	1923 by-election	Patrick McGilligan (CnaG)	William Magennis (CnaG)	Michael Hayes (CnaG)	3 seats from 1923
5th	1927 (Jun)	Patrick McGilligan (CnaG)	Arthur Clery (Ind.)	Michael Hayes (CnaG)	3 seats from 1923
6th	1927 (Sep)	Patrick McGilligan (CnaG)	Michael Tierney (CnaG)	Michael Hayes (CnaG)	3 seats from 1923
7th	1932	Patrick McGilligan (CnaG)	Conor Maguire (FF)	Michael Hayes (CnaG)	3 seats from 1923
8th	1933	Patrick McGilligan (CnaG)	Conor Maguire (FF)	Helena Concannon (FF)	3 seats from 1923
8th	1936	Patrick McGilligan (CnaG)	(Vacant)	Helena Concannon (FF)	3 seats from 1923
