= Conor Maguire (judge) =

Irish politician, lawyer and judge (1889–1971)

Chief Justice of Ireland
- In office 1 June 1946 – 11 June 1961
- Nominated by: Government of Ireland
- Appointed by: Seán T. O'Kelly
- Preceded by: Timothy Sullivan
- Succeeded by: Cearbhall Ó Dálaigh

Judge of the Supreme Court
- In office 4 May 1946 – 11 June 1961
- Nominated by: Government of Ireland
- Appointed by: Seán T. O'Kelly

President of the High Court
- In office 11 March 1936 – 4 May 1946
- Nominated by: Government of Ireland
- Appointed by: Domhnall Ua Buachalla
- Preceded by: Timothy Sullivan
- Succeeded by: George Gavan Duffy

Judge of the High Court
- In office 11 March 1936 – 4 May 1946
- Nominated by: Government of Ireland
- Appointed by: Domhnall Ua Buachalla

Attorney General of Ireland
- In office 10 March 1932 – 2 November 1936
- President: Éamon de Valera
- Preceded by: John A. Costello
- Succeeded by: James Geoghegan

Teachta Dála
- In office February 1932 – 8 March 1936
- Constituency: National University

Personal details
- Born: 16 December 1889 Claremorris, County Mayo, Ireland
- Died: 26 September 1971 (aged 81) Sandymount, Dublin, Ireland
- Resting place: Shanganagh Cemetery, Shankill, Dublin, Ireland
- Party: Fianna Fáil
- Spouse: Nora Whelan (m. 1917)
- Children: 3
- Education: University College Dublin; King's Inns

Conor Alexander Maguire (16 December 1889 – 26 September 1971) was an Irish politician, lawyer and judge who served as Chief Justice of Ireland from 1946 to 1961, a Judge of the Supreme Court from 1946 to 1961, President of the High Court, a Judge of the High Court from 1936 to 1946 and Attorney General of Ireland from March 1932 to November 1936. He served as a Teachta Dála (TD) for the National University of Ireland constituency from 1932 to 1936.

Maguire was born in Claremorris, County Mayo, in 1889. He was educated at Clongowes Wood College and University College Dublin (UCD). At UCD, he was a founding member of the Legal and Economic Society (now known as the University College Dublin Law Society) in 1911.

He then returned to County Mayo, where he practised as a barrister and was instrumental in establishing Ireland's first working Republican Courts, which usurped the existing courts and created a forum to try offenders, resolve grievances and adjudicate on land issues.

He was first elected to Dáil Éireann as a Fianna Fáil TD for the National University constituency at the 1932 general election and was re-elected at the 1933 general election. He was appointed as Attorney General of the Irish Free State in March 1932. In November 1936, he resigned as Attorney General and as a TD on his appointment as President of the High Court and a Judge of the High Court. In 1946, he was appointed as Chief Justice of Ireland, that is the president of the Supreme Court of Ireland, where he served until 1961.

Legal offices
Preceded by John A. Costello	Attorney General of Ireland; 1932–1936	Succeeded by James Geoghegan
Preceded by Timothy Sullivan	Chief Justice of Ireland; 1946–1961	Succeeded by Cearbhall Ó Dálaigh

Dáil	Election	Deputy (Party)	Deputy (Party)	Deputy (Party)	Deputy (Party)
1st	1918	Eoin MacNeill (SF)	1 seat under 1918 Act		
2nd	1921	Eoin MacNeill (SF)	Ada English (SF)	Michael Hayes (SF)	William Stockley (SF)
3rd	1922	Eoin MacNeill (PT-SF)	William Magennis (Ind.)	Michael Hayes (Note: Michael Hayes served as Ceann Comhairle from 9 September 1922 to 29 January 1932.) (PT-SF)	William Stockley (AT-SF)
4th	1923	Eoin MacNeill (CnaG)	William Magennis (CnaG)	Michael Hayes (CnaG)	3 seats from 1923
4th	1923 by-election	Patrick McGilligan (CnaG)	William Magennis (CnaG)	Michael Hayes (CnaG)	3 seats from 1923
5th	1927 (Jun)	Patrick McGilligan (CnaG)	Arthur Clery (Ind.)	Michael Hayes (CnaG)	3 seats from 1923
6th	1927 (Sep)	Patrick McGilligan (CnaG)	Michael Tierney (CnaG)	Michael Hayes (CnaG)	3 seats from 1923
7th	1932	Patrick McGilligan (CnaG)	Conor Maguire (FF)	Michael Hayes (CnaG)	3 seats from 1923
8th	1933	Patrick McGilligan (CnaG)	Conor Maguire (FF)	Helena Concannon (FF)	3 seats from 1923
8th	1936	Patrick McGilligan (CnaG)	(Vacant)	Helena Concannon (FF)	3 seats from 1923
