= Arthur Clery =

Irish academic and politician (1879–1932)

Teachta Dála
- In office June 1927 – September 1927
- Constituency: National University

Personal details
- Born: 25 October 1879 Dublin, Ireland
- Died: 20 November 1932 (aged 53) Dublin, Ireland
- Party: Independent
- Education: University College Dublin

Arthur Edward Clery (25 October 1879 – 20 November 1932) was an Irish republican politician and university professor.

== Early life and education ==
Clery was born at 46 Lower Leeson Street, Dublin, to Arthur Clery (who also used the names Arthur Patrick O'Clery and Arthur Ua Cléirigh), a barrister, and Catherine Moylan. His father, who practised in India, published books on early Irish history.

Clery was brought up to a considerable extent by a relative, Charles Dawson. A cousin, William Dawson (who used the pen-name "Avis"), became his closest friend and associate. Clery was educated at the Catholic University School on Leeson Street (where he acquired the confirmation name "Chanel" in honour of the Marist martyr Peter Chanel, which he often used as a pseudonym), at Clongowes Wood College, and University College in Stephen's Green. He was a university contemporary of James Joyce.

== Professional life ==
Clery's principal themes included the difficulties of Roman Catholic graduates seeking professional employment, dramatic criticism (he hailed Lady Gregory's play Kincora as the Abbey Theatre's first masterpiece but was repulsed by the works of Synge), Catholic-Protestant rivalry, tension within the Dublin professional class, and the vagaries of the Gaelic revival movement.

Clery advocated partition on the basis of a two nation theory, first advanced in 1904–1905 (possibly in response to William O'Brien's advocacy of securing Home Rule through compromise with moderate Unionists). Several of his articles on the subject were reprinted in his 1907 essay collection, The Idea of a Nation.

Clery derived this unusual view for a nationalist from several motives, including a belief that arguments for Irish nationalists' right to self-determination could be used to justify Ulster Unionists' right to secede from Ireland, fear that it might be impossible to obtain Home Rule unless Ulster were excluded, and distaste for both Ulster Protestants and Ulster Catholics, whom he saw as deplorably anglicised. He remained a partitionist for the rest of his life. Clery was not particularly successful as a barrister, but on the establishment of University College Dublin (UCD) in 1909 he was appointed to the part-time post of Professor of the Law of Property.

After 1914 he moved from unenthusiastic support for John Redmond's Irish Parliamentary Party to separatism. Before the 1916 Easter Rising he was an inactive member of the Irish Volunteers, and was defence counsel at the court-martial of Eoin MacNeill. During the 1918 general election he campaigned for Sinn Féin. As one of the few barristers prepared to assist the Sinn Féin Court system he was appointed to the Dáil Supreme Court in 1920.

Clery opposed the Anglo-Irish Treaty because he believed it would lead to re-Anglicisation and the eventual return of the Union. He was elected to Dáil Éireann as an abstentionist independent Teachta Dála (TD) for the National University constituency at the June 1927 general election.

He did not take his seat and he did not contest the September 1927 general election since new legislation obliged candidates to pledge in advance that they would take their seat. He was one of the lawyers who advised Éamon de Valera that the Irish Free State was not legally obliged to pay the Land Annuities which had been agreed in the Anglo-Irish Treaty of 1922.

== Personal life ==
Clery was a close friend of Tom Kettle, with whom he founded a dining club, the "Cui Bono". Hugh Kennedy was also a lifelong friend. As Auditor of the L & H he tried to prevent James Joyce from reading a paper praising Ibsen (Clery had asserted that "the effect of Henrik Ibsen is evil") but Joyce succeeded in reading it after he argued his case with the college president. The principal influence on Clery was the Irish Ireland editor D. P. Moran, to whose weekly paper, The Leader Clery became a frequent contributor. (Clery also wrote as "Chanel" for the University College paper at St. Stephen's, and as "Arthur Synan" for the New Ireland Review.) In addition to The Idea of a Nation, Clery published Dublin Essays (1920) and (as Arthur Synan) The coming of the king.

== Death ==
Clery died, unmarried, in November 1932 in Dublin from heart failure caused by pneumonia.

== Sources ==
- Arthur Clery, The Idea of a Nation (UCD Press edition, 2002; edited by Patrick Maume)
- Patrick Maume, "Nationalism and partition: the political thought of Arthur Clery", Irish Historical Studies November 1998, pp. 222–240

Dáil	Election	Deputy (Party)	Deputy (Party)	Deputy (Party)	Deputy (Party)
1st	1918	Eoin MacNeill (SF)	1 seat under 1918 Act		
2nd	1921	Eoin MacNeill (SF)	Ada English (SF)	Michael Hayes (SF)	William Stockley (SF)
3rd	1922	Eoin MacNeill (PT-SF)	William Magennis (Ind.)	Michael Hayes (Note: Michael Hayes served as Ceann Comhairle from 9 September 1922 to 29 January 1932.) (PT-SF)	William Stockley (AT-SF)
4th	1923	Eoin MacNeill (CnaG)	William Magennis (CnaG)	Michael Hayes (CnaG)	3 seats from 1923
4th	1923 by-election	Patrick McGilligan (CnaG)	William Magennis (CnaG)	Michael Hayes (CnaG)	3 seats from 1923
5th	1927 (Jun)	Patrick McGilligan (CnaG)	Arthur Clery (Ind.)	Michael Hayes (CnaG)	3 seats from 1923
6th	1927 (Sep)	Patrick McGilligan (CnaG)	Michael Tierney (CnaG)	Michael Hayes (CnaG)	3 seats from 1923
7th	1932	Patrick McGilligan (CnaG)	Conor Maguire (FF)	Michael Hayes (CnaG)	3 seats from 1923
8th	1933	Patrick McGilligan (CnaG)	Conor Maguire (FF)	Helena Concannon (FF)	3 seats from 1923
8th	1936	Patrick McGilligan (CnaG)	(Vacant)	Helena Concannon (FF)	3 seats from 1923
