= John Crown =

Irish medical practitioner and former politician (born 1957)

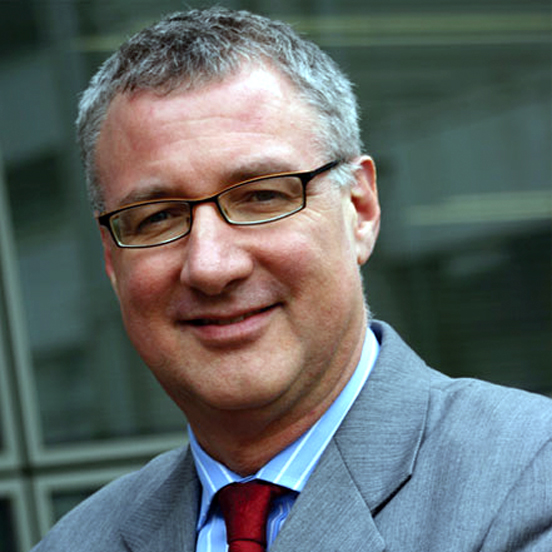

Senator
- In office 25 May 2011 – 8 June 2016
- Constituency: National University

Personal details
- Born: 1 March 1957 (age 69) New York City, United States
- Party: Independent
- Spouse: Orla Murray
- Children: 4
- Education: University College Dublin; State University of New York

John Paul Crown (born 1 March 1957) is an Irish consultant oncologist and former politician who served as a Senator for the National University constituency from 2011 to 2016.

== Background and education ==
Born in Brooklyn, New York to Irish emigrant parents, Crown's family returned to Ireland in 1967, and attended Synge Street CBS and Terenure College. Crown received his medical training in Ireland, the United Kingdom and the United States. A graduate of University College Dublin and the State University of New York, and holds degrees in medicine, science and business administration.

His postdoctoral training took place at Guy's Hospital in London and St. James's Hospital in Dublin. He completed his training in oncology in New York at Mount Sinai Medical Center and the Memorial Sloan–Kettering Cancer Center. He held the post of assistant professor at Weill Cornell Medical College of Cornell University until 1993 when he returned to Ireland, becoming a consultant at two Dublin hospitals: St. Vincent's and St. Luke's. He holds professorships in cancer research from Dublin City University and University College Dublin.

Crown has worked to reform cancer treatment in Ireland as chairman of molecular therapeutics for Cancer Ireland, and founder of the Ireland Co-operative Oncology Research Group (ICORG). Crown, along with his colleagues developed translational breast cancer research.

Crown became a vocal critic of the health policy of the Irish government led by Bertie Ahern and his successor Brian Cowen, and of the Minister for Health Mary Harney. In November 2007 he was involved in a controversy with the state broadcaster RTÉ when he was unexpectedly dropped from a discussion panel on The Late Late Show. The broadcaster denied that pressure had been applied by the government, but the decision was attacked by opposition politicians as "censorship and a denial of free speech".

In May 2021, he was admitted as a member of the Royal Irish Academy.

== Seanad election ==
In March 2011 Crown announced that he would stand for election to Seanad Éireann in the National University constituency. He stood as a non-party candidate, and pledged to give his senator's salary to cancer research. In his regular column in the Sunday Independent, Crown expressed hope that James Reilly, health minister in the new government elected in February 2011 would reform the health services. Offering the electorate what he called "fresh thinking, new abilities, and a different perspective" he was elected on the 24th and final count for the National University constituency.

== Seanad bills ==
As a member of the 24th Seanad, Crown brought three bills before the house. The first was The Reporting of Lobbying in Criminal Legal Cases Bill 2011. It was rejected by the government. A second was the Protection of Children's Health from Tobacco Smoke Bill 2012. It was accepted by the government A third was the Seanad Electoral Reform Bill 2013. It was rejected by the government.

In 2013, Crown stated that Opus Dei prelature was mobilising within the Irish professions to influence efforts at Irish abortion law legalisation.
