= Michael J. Ryan (Irish politician) =

Irish politician (died 1952)

Senator
- In office 18 August 1944 – 21 April 1948
- Constituency: National University

Personal details
- Died: 24 October 1952
- Party: Independent

Michael J. Ryan (died 24 October 1952) was an Irish barrister, professor and an independent member of Seanad Éireann.

He was elected to the 5th Seanad at the 1944 election for the National University constituency. He lost his seat at the 1948 election.
