= Michael Hayes (politician) =

Irish politician (1889–1976)

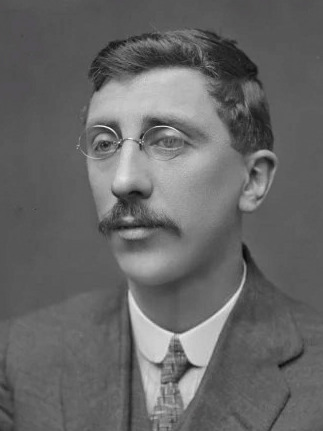
- Hayes, c.1920s

Ceann Comhairle of Dáil Éireann
- In office 9 September 1922 – 9 March 1932
- Preceded by: Eoin MacNeill
- Succeeded by: Frank Fahy

Minister for Foreign Affairs
- In office 21 August 1922 – 9 September 1922
- President: Arthur Griffith
- Preceded by: Arthur Griffith
- Succeeded by: Desmond FitzGerald (External Affairs)

Minister for Education
- In office 11 January 1922 – 9 September 1922
- President: Michael Collins
- Preceded by: John J. O'Kelly
- Succeeded by: Fionán Lynch

Senator
- In office 22 May 1957 – 23 June 1965
- In office 21 April 1948 – 22 July 1954
- Constituency: Cultural and Educational Panel
- In office 22 July 1954 – 22 May 1957
- Constituency: Nominated by the Taoiseach
- In office 27 April 1938 – 21 April 1948
- Constituency: Administrative Panel

Teachta Dála
- In office May 1921 – January 1933
- Constituency: National University

Personal details
- Born: 1 December 1889 Dublin, Ireland
- Died: 11 July 1976 (aged 86) Dublin, Ireland
- Party: Fine Gael
- Spouse: May Kavanagh (m. 1919; died 1967)
- Children: 2
- Education: University College Dublin

Military service
- Years of service: 1913–1916
- Rank: Captain
- Battles/wars: Easter Rising

Michael Joseph Hayes (1 December 1889 – 11 July 1976) was an Irish Fine Gael politician who served as Ceann Comhairle of Dáil Éireann from 1922 to 1932, Minister for Foreign Affairs from August 1922 to September 1922 and Minister for Education January 1922 to August 1922. He served as a Teachta Dála (TD) for the National University constituency from 1921 to 1933. He was a Senator from 1938 to 1965.

Hayes was born in Dublin in 1889. He was educated at the Synge Street CBS and at University College Dublin (UCD). He later became a lecturer in French at the university. In 1913, he was a founding member of the Irish Volunteers and fought in Jacob's Factory during the Easter Rising in 1916. He escaped capture but was arrested in 1920 and interned at Ballykinlar, County Down.

While still interned he was first elected to Dáil Éireann as a Sinn Féin TD for the National University constituency at the 1921 general election. At the 1922 general election he was elected as a Pro-Treaty Sinn Féin TD. He supported the Anglo-Irish Treaty during the crucial debates in 1922. He served as Minister for Education from January to September 1922, as part of the Dáil Ministry (as opposed to the Provisional Government). He had special responsibility for secondary education. He was also acting Minister for Foreign Affairs from August to September 1922. That same year he was elected Ceann Comhairle of the Dáil Éireann. He held that post for ten years until 1932.

At the 1923 general election, he was elected as a Cumann na nGaedheal TD for two constituencies; Dublin South and the National University. He resigned his seat in Dublin South following the election.

Hayes lost his Dáil seat at the 1933 general election, but was elected to Seanad Éireann in 1938 for Fine Gael. He remained a Senator until 1965, acting as leader of government and opposition there.

Hayes became Professor of Irish at University College Dublin in 1951.

Political offices
Preceded by Arthur Griffith	Minister for Foreign Affairs; 1922 (acting)	Succeeded by Desmond FitzGerald
Preceded by John J. O'Kelly	Minister for Education; 11 January 1922 – 9 September 1922	Succeeded by Eoin MacNeill
Preceded by Eoin MacNeill	Ceann Comhairle of Dáil Éireann; 1922–1932	Succeeded by Frank Fahy

Dáil	Election	Deputy (Party)	Deputy (Party)	Deputy (Party)	Deputy (Party)
1st	1918	Eoin MacNeill (SF)	1 seat under 1918 Act		
2nd	1921	Eoin MacNeill (SF)	Ada English (SF)	Michael Hayes (SF)	William Stockley (SF)
3rd	1922	Eoin MacNeill (PT-SF)	William Magennis (Ind.)	Michael Hayes (Note: Michael Hayes served as Ceann Comhairle from 9 September 1922 to 29 January 1932.) (PT-SF)	William Stockley (AT-SF)
4th	1923	Eoin MacNeill (CnaG)	William Magennis (CnaG)	Michael Hayes (CnaG)	3 seats from 1923
4th	1923 by-election	Patrick McGilligan (CnaG)	William Magennis (CnaG)	Michael Hayes (CnaG)	3 seats from 1923
5th	1927 (Jun)	Patrick McGilligan (CnaG)	Arthur Clery (Ind.)	Michael Hayes (CnaG)	3 seats from 1923
6th	1927 (Sep)	Patrick McGilligan (CnaG)	Michael Tierney (CnaG)	Michael Hayes (CnaG)	3 seats from 1923
7th	1932	Patrick McGilligan (CnaG)	Conor Maguire (FF)	Michael Hayes (CnaG)	3 seats from 1923
8th	1933	Patrick McGilligan (CnaG)	Conor Maguire (FF)	Helena Concannon (FF)	3 seats from 1923
8th	1936	Patrick McGilligan (CnaG)	(Vacant)	Helena Concannon (FF)	3 seats from 1923

Dáil	Election	Deputy (Party)	Deputy (Party)	Deputy (Party)	Deputy (Party)	Deputy (Party)	Deputy (Party)	Deputy (Party)
2nd	1921	Thomas Kelly (SF)	Daniel McCarthy (SF)	Constance Markievicz (SF)	Cathal Ó Murchadha (SF)	4 seats 1921–1923		
3rd	1922	Thomas Kelly (PT-SF)	Daniel McCarthy (PT-SF)	William O'Brien (Lab)	Myles Keogh (Ind.)	4 seats 1921–1923		
4th	1923	Philip Cosgrave (CnaG)	Daniel McCarthy (CnaG)	Constance Markievicz (Rep)	Myles Keogh (Ind.)	Cathal Ó Murchadha (Rep)	Michael Hayes (CnaG)	Peadar Doyle (CnaG)
4th	1923 by-election	Philip Cosgrave (CnaG)	Daniel McCarthy (CnaG)	Constance Markievicz (Rep)	Myles Keogh (Ind.)	Cathal Ó Murchadha (Rep)	Hugh Kennedy (CnaG)	Peadar Doyle (CnaG)
4th	March 1924 by-election	James O'Mara (CnaG)	Daniel McCarthy (CnaG)	Constance Markievicz (Rep)	Myles Keogh (Ind.)	Cathal Ó Murchadha (Rep)	Hugh Kennedy (CnaG)	Peadar Doyle (CnaG)
4th	November 1924 by-election	James O'Mara (CnaG)	Daniel McCarthy (CnaG)	Constance Markievicz (Rep)	Myles Keogh (Ind.)	Cathal Ó Murchadha (Rep)	Seán Lemass (SF)	Peadar Doyle (CnaG)
4th	1925 by-election	James O'Mara (CnaG)	Thomas Hennessy (CnaG)	Constance Markievicz (Rep)	Myles Keogh (Ind.)	Cathal Ó Murchadha (Rep)	Seán Lemass (SF)	Peadar Doyle (CnaG)
5th	1927 (Jun)	James Beckett (CnaG)	Vincent Rice (NL)	Constance Markievicz (FF)	Myles Keogh (Ind.)	Thomas Lawlor (Lab)	Seán Lemass (FF)	Peadar Doyle (CnaG)
5th	1927 by-election	James Beckett (CnaG)	Vincent Rice (NL)	Thomas Hennessy (CnaG)	Myles Keogh (Ind.)	Thomas Lawlor (Lab)	Seán Lemass (FF)	Peadar Doyle (CnaG)
6th	1927 (Sep)	James Beckett (CnaG)	Robert Briscoe (FF)	Thomas Hennessy (CnaG)	Myles Keogh (CnaG)	Frank Kerlin (FF)	Seán Lemass (FF)	Peadar Doyle (CnaG)
7th	1932	James Beckett (CnaG)	Robert Briscoe (FF)	Thomas Hennessy (CnaG)	Myles Keogh (CnaG)	James Lynch (FF)	Seán Lemass (FF)	Peadar Doyle (CnaG)
8th	1933	James Beckett (CnaG)	Robert Briscoe (FF)	James McGuire (CnaG)	Thomas Kelly (FF)	James Lynch (FF)	Seán Lemass (FF)	Peadar Doyle (CnaG)
9th	1937	Myles Keogh (FG)	Robert Briscoe (FF)	Thomas Lawlor (Lab)	Thomas Kelly (FF)	Joseph Hannigan (Ind.)	Seán Lemass (FF)	Peadar Doyle (FG)
10th	1938	James Beckett (FG)	Robert Briscoe (FF)	James Lynch (FF)	Thomas Kelly (FF)	Joseph Hannigan (Ind.)	Seán Lemass (FF)	Peadar Doyle (FG)
10th	1939 by-election	John McCann (FF)	Robert Briscoe (FF)	James Lynch (FF)	Thomas Kelly (FF)	Joseph Hannigan (Ind.)	Seán Lemass (FF)	Peadar Doyle (FG)
11th	1943	Maurice Dockrell (FG)	Robert Briscoe (FF)	James Lynch (FF)	James Larkin Jnr (Lab)	John McCann (FF)	Seán Lemass (FF)	Peadar Doyle (FG)
12th	1944	Maurice Dockrell (FG)	Robert Briscoe (FF)	James Lynch (FF)	James Larkin Jnr (Lab)	John McCann (FF)	Seán Lemass (FF)	Peadar Doyle (FG)
13th	1948	Constituency abolished. See Dublin South-Central, Dublin South-East and Dublin South-West.						

Dáil	Election	Deputy (Party)	Deputy (Party)	Deputy (Party)	Deputy (Party)	Deputy (Party)
22nd	1981	Niall Andrews (FF)	Séamus Brennan (FF)	Nuala Fennell (FG)	John Kelly (FG)	Alan Shatter (FG)
23rd	1982 (Feb)	Niall Andrews (FF)	Séamus Brennan (FF)	Nuala Fennell (FG)	John Kelly (FG)	Alan Shatter (FG)
24th	1982 (Nov)	Niall Andrews (FF)	Séamus Brennan (FF)	Nuala Fennell (FG)	John Kelly (FG)	Alan Shatter (FG)
25th	1987	Tom Kitt (FF)	Séamus Brennan (FF)	Anne Colley (PDs)	John Kelly (FG)	Alan Shatter (FG)
26th	1989	Tom Kitt (FF)	Séamus Brennan (FF)	Nuala Fennell (FG)	Roger Garland (GP)	Alan Shatter (FG)
27th	1992	Tom Kitt (FF)	Séamus Brennan (FF)	Liz O'Donnell (PDs)	Eithne FitzGerald (Lab)	Alan Shatter (FG)
28th	1997	Tom Kitt (FF)	Séamus Brennan (FF)	Liz O'Donnell (PDs)	Olivia Mitchell (FG)	Alan Shatter (FG)
29th	2002	Tom Kitt (FF)	Séamus Brennan (FF)	Liz O'Donnell (PDs)	Olivia Mitchell (FG)	Eamon Ryan (GP)
30th	2007	Tom Kitt (FF)	Séamus Brennan (FF)	Alan Shatter (FG)	Olivia Mitchell (FG)	Eamon Ryan (GP)
30th	2009 by-election	Tom Kitt (FF)	George Lee (FG)	Alan Shatter (FG)	Olivia Mitchell (FG)	Eamon Ryan (GP)
31st	2011	Shane Ross (Ind.)	Peter Mathews (FG)	Alan Shatter (FG)	Olivia Mitchell (FG)	Alex White (Lab)
32nd	2016	Constituency abolished. See Dublin Rathdown, Dublin South-West and Dún Laoghaire.				
