= International Listening Association =

The International Listening Association (ILA) is an organization developed to promote the study, development, and teaching of listening. The association is "dedicated to learning more about the impact that listening has on all human activity". The ILA was founded in 1979 in Minneapolis, Minnesota, US. The ILA holds annual conferences throughout the US and chooses locations outside of the US every three to five years. Conference presenters have included people of varied backgrounds related to listening to provide a full range of interesting perspectives on listening, for example: communication professors, corporate trainers, audiologists, musicians, researchers and more.

The Purpose of the Association is to advance the practice, teaching, and research of listening throughout the world. The purpose of the Association will be accomplished in the following ways:

- the Association will establish a network of professionals committed to promoting the study and development of effective listening
- members will exchange information by sharing teaching objectives, learning activities, promotional methods and materials, and additional professional experiences;
- members are encouraged to pursue listening research because listening affects humanity across multiple dimensions, including economics, education, race, culture, and international relations;
- members will pursue management strategies and efforts promoting effective listening in government and business

== Publication ==
ILA publications include the International Journal of Listening (IJL), which publishes original research in listening. The scope of IJL's listening-related topics includes professional, interpersonal, public/political, media or mass communication, educational, intercultural, and international (including second language acquisition contexts). Study methodologies include empirical, pedagogical, philosophical, and historical methods.
