= William Stockley =

Irish politician (1859–1943)

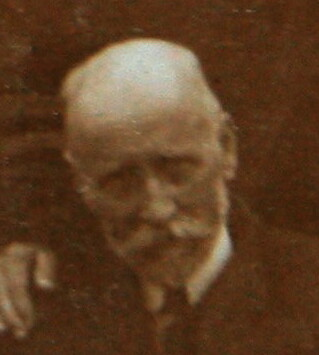
- Stockley in 1929

Teachta Dála
- In office May 1921 – August 1923
- Constituency: National University

Personal details
- Born: 29 June 1859 Dublin, Ireland
- Died: 22 July 1943 (aged 84)
- Party: Sinn Féin
- Spouses: Violet Osborne (m. 1892; died 1893); Marie Germaine Kolb (m. 1908)
- Children: 2
- Education: Trinity College Dublin

British Army intelligence file Prof. W. Stockley

William Frederick Paul Stockley (29 June 1859 – 22 July 1943) was an Irish academic, Sinn Féin politician and Teachta Dála (TD).

== Early life ==
W. F. P. Stockley was born in Templeogue, County Dublin, and was educated at Rathmines School. He was the son of John Surtees Stockley (1816–1863), who had been a British Army veterinary surgeon with the Royal Artillery during the Crimean War (and for which he was awarded the Légion d'Honneur by the French government), and Alicia Diana Catherine Gabbett of High Park, Caherconlish, County Limerick.

W. F. P. Stockley's grandfather, William Stockley (1776–1860), a veterinary surgeon in the Royal Horse Artillery from 1805 to 1858 and President of the Royal College of Veterinary Surgeons, lived in Corkagh, Clondalkin, County Dublin, until 1837, after which he served in Canada and later lived out his life in London. The Stockleys were a Protestant family and W. F. P. Stockley had been raised in that faith before converting to Roman Catholicism in 1894.

== Academic ==
Stockley took a senior moderatorship in modern literature at Trinity College Dublin, where his classmates included Douglas Hyde, and graduated in 1883 with a BA in English and French.

From 1896 to 1903 he was professor at the University of Ottawa and at the University of New Brunswick. In 1905, he was appointed professor of English at University College, Cork. He occupied the chair until his retirement in 1931.

He was president of the Cork Literary and Scientific Society from 1913 to 1915 and President of the Cork Library Committee from 1913 to 1930.

He was author of several books including English Visitors to Ireland from Raleigh to Newman, Newman, Education, and Ireland, Studies in Irish Biography and Introduction to the Dream of Gerontius.

== Politics ==
Stockley was a member of Sinn Féin. He was an alderman of the Cork Corporation from 1920 to 1925. In 1920, an attempt was made on his life by police agents. At the 1921 Irish elections, he was elected unopposed as a Sinn Féin member to the Second Dáil for the National University constituency. He voted against the Anglo-Irish Treaty of 1921 and refused to accept the legitimacy of the Irish Free State.

He retained his seat, as an anti-Treaty Sinn Féin TD, at the 1922 general election. Along with others, he maintained that the Irish Republic continued to exist and that the rump Second Dáil, composed of anti-Treaty TDs who refused to take their seats in the Free State parliament, was the only legitimate governmental authority in Ireland. He was defeated in the 1923 general election and subsequent November 1923 by-election.

In 1938, he was one of seven remaining abstentionist Second Dáil TDs who transferred the "authority" of what they believed was the Government of the Irish Republic to the IRA Army Council.

== Family ==
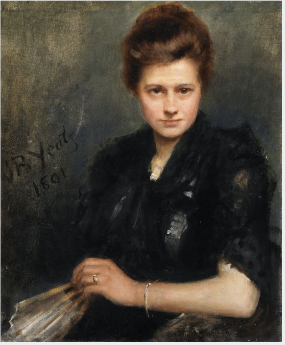
Portrait of Violet Osborne, Mrs Stockley (1891) by Jack Butler Yeats

William Stockley married Violet Osborne in 1892, daughter of Dublin artist William Osborne and sister of Walter Osborne. At her death in 1893 she left one daughter, Violet Annie Alice Stockley, who was brought up for some years by the Osborne family in Dublin. She later became a member of staff at Cheltenham Ladies' College and died unmarried in 1971.

In 1908 Stockley married Marie Germaine Kolb, the daughter of Max Kolb, director of the Botanical Gardens in Munich, and Sophie Danvin, a French pianist. Marie Germaine Stockley died in Dublin in 1949 leaving one daughter, Sophia Stockley, who in 1933 married James Laurence Mallin, eldest son of the executed Michael Mallin.

His brother was the Anglican clergyman Joseph John Gabbett Stockley (1862–1949), Canon of Lichfield Cathedral. Stockley's sister-in-law was the German writer Annette Kolb, and a nephew, Alfred Kolb, was a West German diplomat who helped establish the Federal Republic's first Irish legation in 1951.

At his death in 1943 at the age of 84, Stockley resided at Arundel, Ballintemple, Cork. He is buried in St. Finbarr's Cemetery, Cork.

Dáil	Election	Deputy (Party)	Deputy (Party)	Deputy (Party)	Deputy (Party)
1st	1918	Eoin MacNeill (SF)	1 seat under 1918 Act		
2nd	1921	Eoin MacNeill (SF)	Ada English (SF)	Michael Hayes (SF)	William Stockley (SF)
3rd	1922	Eoin MacNeill (PT-SF)	William Magennis (Ind.)	Michael Hayes (Note: Michael Hayes served as Ceann Comhairle from 9 September 1922 to 29 January 1932.) (PT-SF)	William Stockley (AT-SF)
4th	1923	Eoin MacNeill (CnaG)	William Magennis (CnaG)	Michael Hayes (CnaG)	3 seats from 1923
4th	1923 by-election	Patrick McGilligan (CnaG)	William Magennis (CnaG)	Michael Hayes (CnaG)	3 seats from 1923
5th	1927 (Jun)	Patrick McGilligan (CnaG)	Arthur Clery (Ind.)	Michael Hayes (CnaG)	3 seats from 1923
6th	1927 (Sep)	Patrick McGilligan (CnaG)	Michael Tierney (CnaG)	Michael Hayes (CnaG)	3 seats from 1923
7th	1932	Patrick McGilligan (CnaG)	Conor Maguire (FF)	Michael Hayes (CnaG)	3 seats from 1923
8th	1933	Patrick McGilligan (CnaG)	Conor Maguire (FF)	Helena Concannon (FF)	3 seats from 1923
8th	1936	Patrick McGilligan (CnaG)	(Vacant)	Helena Concannon (FF)	3 seats from 1923
