= Roger McHugh =

Irish academic and politician (1908–1987)

Senator
- In office 22 July 1954 – 22 May 1957
- Constituency: National University

Personal details
- Born: 24 July 1908 County Dublin, Ireland
- Died: 1 January 1987 (aged 78) Dublin, Ireland
- Party: Independent; Córas na Poblachta
- Spouse: Patricia Kelly (m. 1942)
- Children: 5
- Education: University College Dublin

Roger Joseph McHugh (24 July 1908 – 1 January 1987) was an Irish academic, author, playwright, politician and Irish republican.

He was educated Our Lady's Bower, Athlone; Synge Street CBS, Dublin and University College Dublin (UCD).

McHugh was a supporter of a minor Irish Republican political party Córas na Poblachta and a friend of Irish Republican Army leader Seamus O'Donovan. In 1939 McHugh was interned by the Irish Free State at the Curragh internment camp.

He was elected to Seanad Éireann as an independent member in 1954 by the National University constituency. He lost his seat at the 1957 election.

In 1965 he became Professor of English at UCD and in 1966 he was appointed the first Professor of Anglo–Irish Literature and Drama.

He wrote two plays, each produced at the Abbey Theatre: Trial at Green Street courthouse (1941), and Rossa (1945).
