= The Claddagh Embrace =

Gay mural in Dublin, Ireland

- Claddagh Embrace
- The Claddagh Embrace prior to destruction

- Location in Dublin, Ireland
- Artist: Joe Caslin
- Completion date: 10 April 2015
- Medium: Paper, glue
- Movement: Yes Equality campaign
- Subject: Male same-sex couple
- Designation: Mural
- Condition: Destroyed
- Location: Dublin; 53°20′39″N 6°15′52″W
- Preceded by: Our Nation's Sons
- Followed by: Lesbian mural on Caherkinmonwee Castle, County Galway
- Website: joecaslin.com/pages/equality

The Claddagh Embrace, or just Claddagh Embrace, was a large-scale paper wall mural on a building in Dublin, Ireland created by street artist Joe Caslin. The mural was unveiled on 10 April 2015 during the lead up to the referendum on the Thirty-fourth Amendment of the Constitution of Ireland, which legalized same-sex marriage in the Republic of Ireland. On 21 April 2015 Dublin City Council (DCC) sent a warning letter calling for the mural's removal as the mural was placed on a historic building without requesting planning permission from Dublin City Council. Rain heavily damaged the mural on 29 April 2015. The mural depicted a male same-sex couple, and is considered a symbol of same-sex marriage in the Republic of Ireland. A month later, Caslin released a sister piece featuring a female same-sex couple in County Galway.

== History ==
=== Background ===
Katherine Zappone and Ann Louise Gilligan lost a case in the High Court in 2006 for the recognition by Ireland of their Canadian same-sex marriage. The Civil Partnership and Certain Rights and Obligations of Cohabitants Act 2010 instituted civil partnership in Irish law. After the 2011 general election, the Fine Gael and Labour parties formed a coalition government, whose programme included the establishment of a Constitutional Convention to examine potential changes on specified issues, including "Provision for the legalisation of same-sex marriage". The Convention considered the issue in May 2013 and voted to recommend that the state should be required, rather than merely permitted, to allow for same-sex marriage. Its report was formally submitted in July and the government formally responded in December, when Taoiseach Enda Kenny said a referendum would be held "no later than mid-2015".

Some legal academics claimed that extending marriage to same-sex couples did not require a constitutional amendment and could have been accomplished by an ordinary Act of the Oireachtas. Then-minister Shatter disagreed in November 2013, stating that there was "ample case law" to the effect that "marriage is understood as being between one man and one woman".

In January 2015, the wording of the proposed amendment was agreed at a special cabinet meeting and published in the press. The bill was formally introduced in the Dáil by the Minister for Justice and Equality, Frances Fitzgerald.

=== Creation and destruction ===
The Claddagh Embrace was created by Roscommon town street artist and LGBTQ rights activist Joe Caslin as part of the Yes Equality campaign during the lead up to the referendum on the Thirty-fourth Amendment of the Constitution of Ireland, which legalized same-sex marriage in the Republic of Ireland. It was pasted and unveiled 10 April 2015 on the historic Rick's Burgers building opposite gay bar The George at the corner of Dame Street and South Great George's Street in Dublin, Ireland.

It was created using paper and a non-acrylic glue made from potatoes, and created on the Rick's Burgers building with permission from the owner. It was inspired by a photograph taken by Dublin photographer Sean Jackson depicting two men, and Frederic William Burton's painting The Meeting on the Turret Stairs. It depicted a male same-sex couple cuddling in a monochromatic "pencil drawn" style. The name is a reference to the Claddagh ring.

On 15 April, DCC issued a complaint letter to Caslin, calling for its removal, as Caslin had not sought planning permission for artwork on the historic building. Prior to this, DCC was sent several requests for the statue's removal or covering up from people campaigning for the referendum to fail. After the letter, 15,000 people signed an online petition to save the mural.

On 29 April 2015, it was heavily damaged after days of expected continuous rainfall, with parts of it peeling and withering as the paper dissolved in the rain. Speaking to TheDailyEdge.ie, Caslin said that he was expecting it to happen.

== Reception and legacy ==
On 20 May 2015, it was on the front page of the International New York Times for a story about Ireland legalizing same-sex marriage. Two days later – when the referendum passed – people were seen dancing under it. Newstalk considered it to have "sparked controversy" after its installation, calling it controversial. A month later, Caslin created a sister piece on Caherkinmonwee Castle in County Galway.

Her.ie called the artwork a "poignant vocal point" that would be remembered whenever people think about the amendment. Art critic Cristín Leach, Gay Community News (GCN) and Belfast Live consider it to be a symbol of Irish marriage equality. RTÉ described the piece as "moving", "iconic" and Caslin's most recognizable work, saying "The iconic image captured the hope, empathy and significance of that referendum, but for Caslin, identity - and the fight to express that identity - has been long intertwined with his art". Additionally, writing for RTÉ, journalist Lauren Murphy considered the artwork to be "roundly hailed for its subtle-yet-powerful statement". The Westmeath Independent said it was "the most potent symbol of the pro-marriage equality side", also describing it as "striking and highly-acclaimed". The College View said it was an emblem of the referendum.

In 2017, the artwork was selected as part of a series of newspaper articles by Leach for RTÉ about 21 artworks that she believed best "defined Modern Ireland" [sic], saying that it is "a single artwork [that] can be identified as having had a significant political impact [and] carried weight during a time of noted societal shift." Leach described the men's expression as "worried, sad, perhaps even afraid-looking". In Michael G. Cronin's 2022 books Revolutionary bodies: Homoeroticism and the political imagination in Irish writing and Sexual/Liberation: Síreacht Longings for another Ireland, he considered the piece to be developing a "very significant media currency [..] as a key signifier of the marriage equality campaign".
