= Joe Caslin =

Irish street artist, activist and art teacher,

- Occupations: Street artist, activist, art teacher, and public speaker
- Notable work: The Claddagh Embrace, Finding Power

Joe Caslin is an Irish street artist, activist, art teacher, and public speaker. He is known for realistic pencil drawings, often explicitly engaging with social issues. He challenges themes like drug addiction, immigration, consent, suicide, and marriage equality through his art. He has confronted the victims of drug addiction, economic marginalization, marriage inequality, stigma in mental health, the Irish asylum system, institutional power, and sexual consent.

== Early life and education ==
He was born in Roscommon, Ireland. He holds an Master of Fine Arts in Illustration from Edinburgh University and has studied at Limerick School of Art and Design, NUI Galway, and National College of Art and Design (NCAD). He graduated from NCAD in Dublin,Ireland.

== Career ==
In April 2015, Caslin revealed The Claddagh Embrace on Dame Street, Dublin. It depicts two men embracing during the #YesEquality campaign. It became a symbol of the pro-marriage-equality campaign side in the same sex marriage referendum. The referendum passed to extend civil rights to same-sex couples. A month later, he installed a mural of two women on the side of a castle, which was inspired by Frederic William Burton’s painting The Meeting on the Turret Stairs.

In 2019, the National Gallery of Ireland acquired Finding Power, a body of work by Caslin. It is on display in the Gallery Courtyard. The body of work contains seven photographic portraits, a highly finished graphite and ink drawing, a sketchbook, and a large-scale temporary installation. The drawing (2018) is a four-storey high mural inspired by the National Gallery of Ireland's 2018 exhibition about Frederic William Burton.

He has advocated for LGBTQ+ rights and marriage equality through murals. In 2024, he campaigned for marriage equality throughout Ireland, which challenged the mental health stigma.

In 2016, he installed a five-storey mural of a married lesbian couple in Belfast. This was done to campaign for same-sex marriage in Northern Ireland. He revealed a 50-foot mural before the Pride weekend in Dublin. It was a collaborative project that took over a year to finish. He is also a secondary school art teacher at Tullamore College.

== Awards ==
He was awarded the 2013 Association of Illustrators award for New Talent in Public Realm Illustration. He was named the Winner of the Public Realm New Talent Award by the World Association of Illustrators. His work has been featured in The Gluckman.
