= Mothers and Fathers Matter =

Irish political advocacy group

- Formation: 30 September 2014
- Dissolved: June 2015
- Headquarters: 77 Sir John Rogerson’s Quay, Dublin 2
- Region served: Ireland
- Chairperson: Ray Kinsella
- Website: MothersandFathersMatter.ie

Mothers and Fathers Matter (MFM) was a campaign group in Ireland which was formed in September 2014 to oppose the Children and Family Relationships Bill. MFM also opposed the Thirty-fourth Amendment of the Constitution (Marriage Equality) Bill 2015.

Members and spokespeople for MFM included Keith Mills, Evana Kirrane Boyle, Tom Finegan, anti-abortion campaigner Kate Bopp, ecologist Sam Shepard and David Quinn, of the Iona Institute pressure group. The group was chaired by economist Ray Kinsella.

== Children and Family Relationships Bill ==
MFM opposed the enactment of the Children and Family Relationships Bill, which amended family law in Ireland to extend parental rights and responsibilities to non-traditional families, simplified adoption rights for the spouse or civil partner of a biological parent, and for a long-term domestic partner, and also addressed donor-assisted reproduction (sperm donation and egg donation). The group believed the legislation could, in some cases, deprive a child of a mother and father, and turned donor eggs into a commodity.

In February 2015, the group demonstrated outside Dáil Éireann against the Bill, which was approved by the Dáil on 12 March 2015 and signed into law on 6 April 2015. MFM subsequently said it was planning a legal challenge to the act.

== 2015 Marriage Equality Referendum ==
MFM launched its campaign against the 2015 Marriage Referendum on 18 April 2015. At its launch, the group were challenged to produce research to back their claims and promised to publish any research in dispute on their website. They failed to do so, and their claims have since been proven false. UNICEF criticised the group for misinterpreting its research data.

On Saturday 25 April 2015, MFM hosted a conference in the Marino Institute of Education with speakers advocating the retention of the current definition of marriage. On Friday 1 May 2015, Keith Mills represented MFM on a debate on the referendum on RTÉ's The Late Late Show.

On 13 May 2015, Irish historian Professor John A Murphy wrote a letter to The Irish Times in which he described the constitutional amendment, which permitted same sex marriage and extended constitutional protection to families based on such marriages, as "grotesque nonsense." Following this, MFM Advisory Committee member, David Quinn, tweeted "Proposed change to marriage 'grotesque nonsense' ... Great letter by Prof John A Murphy in @IrishTimes today." Mr Quinn was criticised for this tweet by Irish LGBT rights activist Panti, who wrote: "I can think of lots of things that are grotesque. Extending constitutional protection to all families is not one of them... I would call it 'fair', 'reasonable', 'compassionate', 'considerate', 'respectful', or even 'the very least we can do'. But not 'grotesque'."

On 16 May 2015, MFM spokesperson Evana Boyle gave an interview to The Washington Post:

Boyle, a lawyer and a mother of four, said her side is counting on a backlash to a new era in which homosexuality has become “normalized.” When even Catholic schools plan lessons around LGBT Awareness Week, she said, she needs to be on guard against attempts to indoctrinate her own children. “The idea of having two dads, they just go, ‘Eww, that’s not right,’ ” she said.

In June 2015, the MFM Facebook page was deactivated.

=== Poster controversy ===
A Mothers and Fathers Matter poster referencing surrogacy, together with a Fine Gael poster denying that the issue was relevant.

The 'No' posters published by MFM during the Marriage Equality campaign were widely criticised as an attempt to sow confusion and to conflate different issues (such as surrogacy) with the Marriage Equality Referendum. On 24 April 2015, an Irish Times journalist, Conor Pope, filmed and confronted individuals who were removing some of the group's posters from Gardiner Street. Responding, the Yes Equality campaign condemned the removal of any posters, but pointed out that their canvassers had also been abused and threatened. One Dublin hotel (notorious for courting publicity) offered a discount to guests who took down 'No' posters.

Some claimed that the 'No' posters were insulting to single parents, adoptive parents and heterosexual and same-sex parents who had availed of assisted human reproduction. One such mother said "The poster is nonsense – it implies that surrogacy is simply for same-sex couples. There are many parents, myself included, that have had children thanks to the help of other people. To say that I am not the mother of my children because I could not biologically carry them is an insulting suggestion, and one that is clearly aimed at shaming families that do not conform to this group’s narrow view of what constitutes a family.” Tánaiste Joan Burton described the posters as "demeaning", saying "The notion that people who have been raised in anything other than the kind of perfect family situation that the No people describe, frankly, I find it undermining of people in a way I think is regrettable."

In early May 2015, the couple featured in the stock photos used on MFM posters denounced the use of their image in the No campaign. Releasing a statement through Amnesty International, they said "We completely support same-sex marriage, and we believe that same-sex couples should, of course, be able to adopt, as we believe that they are equally able to provide children with much-needed love and care. To suggest otherwise is offensive to us, and to many others."

On 7 May, the retired Archdeacon of Dublin, Gordon Linney, described the posters as homophobic, saying that the posters' "real target is gay people and a crude attempt to discredit them as suitable parents. This is where we can talk candidly about homophobia because the implication is that gay people are at best incapable of caring for children or at worst a danger to children."

The independent Referendum Commission received "dozens" of complaints about the posters, and pointed to a statement on their website on the question, which reads "The Children and Family Relationships Act 2015 deals with parentage in the cases of donor–assisted births but not with surrogacy. The Act has been passed and will be enacted regardless of the outcome of the marriage equality referendum." They added "In view of the number of complaints regarding the surrogacy poster, the Commission may comment further in the coming weeks." Carol Coulter, former Irish Times legal affairs editor and director of the Child Care Law Reporting Project, also wrote that the referendum had nothing to do with surrogacy, and pointed out that where it was legal, such as in the UK, it was mostly availed of by heterosexual, married couples.
