= Caher Castle =

Caher Castle may refer to:

- Caherkinmonwee Castle, County Galway, Ireland
- Cahir Castle, County Tipperary, Ireland
