= Ray Kinsella (economist) =

Irish economist

Ray Kinsella is an Irish economist who has held professorships in the University of Ulster in financial services and at the Smurfit Graduate Business School at University College Dublin in economics and banking. He studied at the University of Hull where he obtained a BSc and MSc in Economics, and at Trinity College Dublin where he was awarded his PhD.

Kinsella worked as an economist in the Central Bank of Ireland and subsequently attended the International Monetary Fund Institute in Washington D.C., gaining a Diploma in Financial Analysis and Policy. Kinsella served as an Economic Advisor to the Department of Industry and Commerce, before becoming a professor at the University of Ulster.

Kinsella's articles have appeared in the Irish Examiner, Irish Independent, The Irish Catholic, the Belfast Telegraph, and Studies: An Irish Quarterly Review. Kinsella is a euro-skeptic and is anti-abortion, campaigning against the repeal of the 8th amendment. In September 2018, Kinsella spoke as an independent euro-skeptic at the launch of the Irish Freedom party.

Kinsella served as chair of Mothers and Fathers Matter which campaigned against the Children and Family Relationships Act 2015 and against the introduction of same-sex marriage in the 2015 Referendum.

== Publications ==
- Troikanomics: Austerity, Autonomy and Existential Crisis in the European Union, by Ray Kinsella and Maurice Kinsella, Publisher: Springer Nature Switzerland AG. ISBN 9783030404321 (2020)
- Rebuilding Trust in Banking: Regulation, Corporate Governance and Ethics in Banking, by Ray Kinsella. Publisher: Vonier Press. ISBN 9780956271808 (2009)
- Acute Healthcare in Transition in Ireland: Changes, Cutbacks and Challenges, edited by, Prof. Ray Kinsella. Oak Tree Press, Dublin (2004).
- The Private Medical Insurance Market: Reform, Opportunities and Challenges, by Ray Kinsella and Jane O'Mahony, Center for Insurance Studies, Dublin (2000)
