= Sinéad Burke =

Irish writer, academic and disability activist

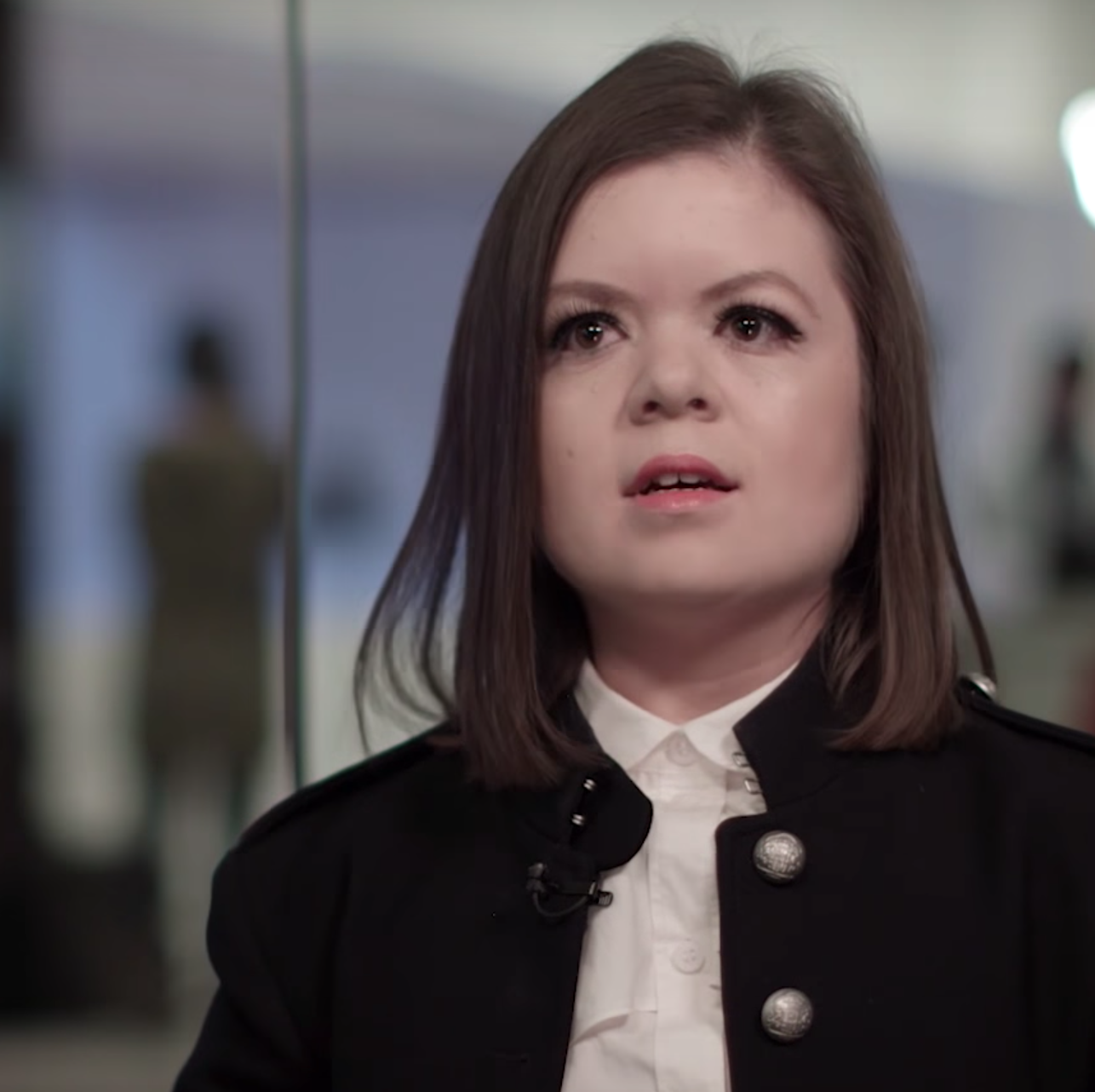
- Burke at the 2018 World Economic Forum

Member of the Council of State
- In office 4 April 2019 – 11 November 2025
- Appointed by: Michael D. Higgins

Personal details
- Born: 1990 (age 35–36)
- Height: 3 ft 5 in (1.04 m)
- Website: tiltingthelens.com

Sinéad Burke (born 1990) is the CEO and Founder of Tilting the Lens, a strategic accessibility consultancy that creates system change, and the conditions for Disabled people to be successful. She began her career as a writer, academic and disability advocate, known for her TED talk 'Why design should include everyone'. She was a member of the Irish Council of State from 2019 to 2025.

Burke released her first book, Break the Mould, in October 2020. It was awarded the Specsavers Children's Book of the Year award at the An Post Irish Book Awards. Sinéad appeared on the cover of the 'Forces for Change' issue of British Vogue, guest-edited by the Duchess of Sussex. She also appeared on the cover of The Business of Fashion in May 2018 alongside Kim Kardashian with an interview as part of 'The Age of Influence' series. In May 2023, Sinéad and her team at Tilting the Lens were the consulting editors of British Vogue's Reframing Fashion issue, where four Disabled people (including Sinéad) were on individual covers, 19 Disabled people were profiled inside and all cover interviews were written by Disabled writers. In May 2026, Tilting the Lens consulted on the Costume Institute's summer exhibition, Costume Art which speaks to the power of fashion as art because of embodiment. Sinéad and the team consulted on the development of the section, "The Disabled Body", spotlighting disabled fashion designers, the development of mannequins based on Disabled bodies, and for the first time, advised on the Met Gala having a step-free entrance to become more accessible.

== Education ==
Burke trained as a primary school teacher, graduating from Marino Institute of Education at the top of her class and winning the Vere Foster medal and holds a Masters in Broadcast Production for TV and Radio from IADT. She holds honorary doctorates from the University of Edinburgh in Scotland, Parsons School of Design in New York, and University College Cork in Ireland.

== Fashion and design advocacy. ==
As a 16-year old, Burke often felt excluded from fashion conversations and experiences due to her limited choices available to her as someone with achondroplasia, so she started blogging to highlight the exclusive nature of the fashion industry. "People didn't take me seriously because of my physical aesthetic, so I started blogging... and collaborating with the [fashion] industry". Burke was invited to attend the White House for an event titled 'Design for all' where the Obama administration highlighted the intersection of fashion and disability. Burke actively campaigns to highlight the importance of inclusive design in all areas of life due to the practical challenges she faces in living and moving in a world that was not designed for people with disabilities. "Design is an enormous privilege, but it is a bigger responsibility".

In 2012, Burke as Miss Minnie Mélange won the final Alternative Miss Ireland competition. In 2019, Burke became the first person with dwarfism to attend the Met Gala. She was one of 15 women selected to appear on the cover of the September 2019 issue of British Vogue, by guest editor Meghan, Duchess of Sussex.

Burke is an ambassador for the Irish Society for the Prevention of Cruelty to Children and the Irish Girl Guides. On 4 April 2019 Michael D. Higgins, the President of Ireland, appointed her to his Council of State. She was a part of the Finding Power collection by Joe Caslin displayed in the National Gallery of Ireland.

Burke appeared on the long-running BBC Radio 4 programme Desert Island Discs (hosted by Lauren Laverne) on Sunday 17 May 2020. Her luxury item was the special necklace that each female member of her immediate family has. In 2023, Burke appeared on the cover of British Vogue with four other disabled activists to highlight the magazine's feature article "Reframing Fashion: Dynamic, Daring, & Disabled."

== Podcast ==
In October 2019, Burke released As Me with Sinéad, a podcast series from the Lemonada Media network focused on empathy, identity, and perception through in-depth interviews. Burke serves as host of the show, with Pod Save the People's Jessica Cordova Kramer as executive producer.

Guests of As Me have included Victoria Beckham, Jamie Lee Curtis, Jameela Jamil, Hozier, Akilah Hughes, Riz Ahmed, Mara Wilson, Radhika Jones, Tig Notaro, Dan Levy, and Florence Welch. Each guest was asked to elaborate on what it's like to be them, with the stated intent of challenging biases and deepening humanity.

== Publication ==
On 28 May 2020, Burke announced her new children's book, Break The Mould, which would contain lessons, for adults as well as children, about being different. Burke wrote while in lockdown during the COVID-19 pandemic. The book was released on 15 October, where pre-order sales had determined it as a best-seller. In November 2020, Break The Mould was announced as the winner of the 'Specsavers Children's Book of the Year – Senior' category at the An Post Irish Book Awards 2020.

== Recognition ==
She was recognized as one of the BBC's 100 women of 2019.

She was awarded the 2025 Design Innovation Medal by the London Design Festival.
