= Marriage Act 2015 =

Law in Ireland

Oireachtas
- Long title: An Act to amend the Civil Registration Act 2004 to remove the impediment to marriage of the parties being of the same sex; to repeal certain provisions of Part 7A of that Act relating to registration of civil partnerships; to make provision in relation to religious bodies; to provide for the recognition of marriages under the law of a place other than the State; to amend the Succession Act 1965, the Civil Partnership and Certain Rights and Obligations of Cohabitants Act 2010 and the Gender Recognition Act 2015; to amend other enactments and to provide for matters connected therewith
- Citation: No. 35 of 2015
- Passed by: Dáil Éireann
- Passed: 7 October 2015
- Passed by: Seanad Éireann
- Passed: 22 October 2015
- Signed by: Presidential Commission
- Signed: 29 October 2015
- Commenced: 16 November 2015

Legislative history

First chamber: Dáil Éireann
- Bill title: Marriage Bill 2015
- Bill citation: No. 78 of 2015
- Introduced by: Minister for Justice and Equality (Frances Fitzgerald)
- Introduced: 17 September 2015
- First reading: 15 September 2015
- Second reading: 23 September 2015
- Third reading: 7 October 2015

Second chamber: Seanad Éireann
- Member(s) in charge: Minister for Justice and Equality (Frances Fitzgerald)
- Second reading: 20 October 2015
- Third reading: 22 October 2015

Related legislation
- Thirty-fourth Amendment of the Constitution of Ireland; Civil Partnership and Certain Rights and Obligations of Cohabitants Act 2010

Keywords
- same-sex marriage, inheritance
- Status: Current legislation

The Marriage Act 2015 (No. 35 of 2015; previously bill No. 78 of 2015) is an act of the Oireachtas which provides for same-sex marriage in Ireland. The act gives legislative effect in statute law to the Thirty-fourth Amendment of the Constitution of Ireland, which mandates such provision. It was introduced on 15 September 2015 and signed into law on 29 October 2015, and commenced (came into force) on 16 November 2015.

== Background ==
The Thirty-fourth Amendment of the Constitution of Ireland was approved by referendum on 22 May 2015. It made recognition of same-sex marriages compulsory rather than optional. In March 2015, the Department of Justice and Equality published the general scheme of the Marriage Bill 2015, setting out the changes to be made to marriage law if the proposed amendment was enacted. Lawyer Benedict Ó Floinn felt the bill's drafting should have been completed before the referendum, to minimise the lacuna during which statute law is out of step with the constitution. The Fine Gael–Labour government hoped to have the Marriage Bill enacted before the Oireachtas' summer adjournment, but the constitutional change did not come into force until 29 August 2015 when the amendment bill was signed into law by the President; it had been delayed until the Court of Appeal rejected two petitions challenging the conduct of the referendum. The government stated its intention to enact the Marriage Bill "as early as possible" after the Dáil's resumption on 22 September 2015. The bill was approved at a cabinet meeting on 16 September for publication the following day.

== Provisions ==
The act's provisions include removing the previous legislative bar on same-sex couples marrying, allowing foreign same-sex marriages to be registered in Ireland as marriages rather than as civil partnerships, and dissolving a civil partnership if the partners marry each other. Authorised solemnisers of marriage from religious groups are allowed to refuse to officiate at same-sex ceremonies. The Gender Recognition Act 2015 as originally enacted required a transgender person to be unmarried to recognise a change of legal sex; the Marriage Act removed this restriction.

The act provided that applications for civil partnership pending when it came into force could be converted into applications for marriage. It was under this provision that the first same-sex marriages took place. Beginning six months after the act came into force, new civil partnerships ceased to be available. The minister's explanation was:

I have been advised that it would not be constitutional to keep civil partnership available and to open it to opposite-sex couples as this would create a risk of making civil partnership a potential competitor to marriage. All of the advice I have makes it clear that making a marriage-like relationship available would violate the constitutional pledge to "guard with special care the institution of Marriage, on which the Family is founded, and to protect it against attack".

The act came into force by ministerial order via statutory instrument rather than automatically upon enactment. Fitzgerald allowed for a delay to enable registrars to ask couples with pending civil partnership registrations whether they wish to marry instead. The Irish Times reported on 31 October that the commencement date would be 16 November. This was confirmed when the order was signed on 10 November.

== Passage ==
The bill's second reading in Dáil Éireann was introduced by minister Frances Fitzgerald on 23 September 2015, the second day of the autumn session; the previous day's business had been pre-empted by a confidence motion relating to the Fennelly Commission. After the second reading, the bill was referred to the select committee on Justice, Defence and Equality. The committee considered the bill on 30 September and made no amendments, although Michael McNamara gave notice that he would be proposing at report stage to remove the bill's provision ending the granting of civil partnerships. Niall Collins passed on a criticism of the bill's amendment to pension law, which Fitzgerald said would be addressed in a separate "finance and succession Bill". At the report stage on 7 October, two amendments from the minister were accepted, while McNamara's amendment on civil partnership was rejected for the constitutional reasons given by Fitzgerald, and another to allow registration of more solemnisers was rejected as out of scope. The bill immediately passed final stage in the Dáil.

The bill was scheduled to be introduced in Seanad Éireann on 15 October, but the day's sitting was cancelled for the state funeral of Garda Tony Golden. The bill was rescheduled for 20 October and passed the second stage the same day. Remaining Seanad stages were completed without amendment on 22 October. Jillian van Turnhout's amendment, to remove the power of the courts to allow marriage of persons below the standard marriageable age of 18, was withdrawn as out of scope; David Norris withdrew a pension amendment similar to Michael McNamara's Dáil amendment as a matter for the Department of Public Expenditure and Reform; an amendment by Rónán Mullen, intended to ensure religious solemnisers would not be obliged to allow "spouse" as well as "husband" and "wife" to be used in their ceremonies, was opposed by the minister as redundant, and voted down. Mullen was the only Senator to oppose the bill's final stage.

In accordance with the Constitution, the bill was sent to the office of the President of Ireland, who is required to sign it into law between five and seven days after its passage. As President Michael D. Higgins was on an official visit to the United States, the bill was actually signed by the Presidential Commission. On 10 November 2015, at a ceremony in Dublin Castle, minister Fitzgerald signed the order that would commence the act from 16 November, and Joan Burton, the Minister for Social Protection, signed a separate order amending the regulations for civil registration of marriages converted from civil partnerships. The first same-sex marriage ceremony was at 8:30 am on 17 November 2015 in Clonmel, County Tipperary.
