= Tiernan Brady =

Irish politician/LGBT activist

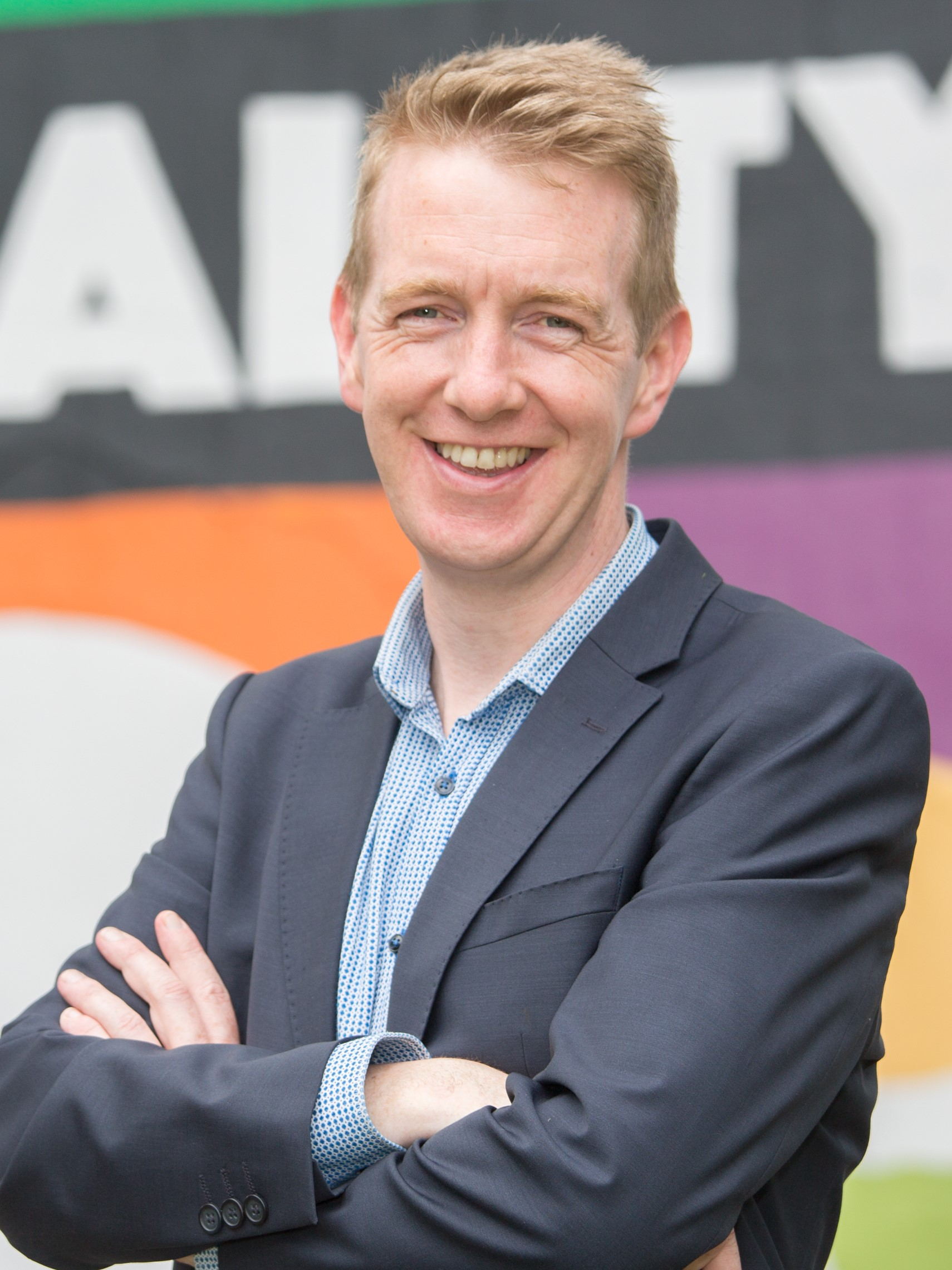
- Brady in 2016
- Born: Enniskillen, County Fermanagh, Northern Ireland
- Education: B.A. in Economics (UCD); M.A. in International Relations (DCU)
- Known for: political and LGBT rights campaigner
- Political party: Fianna Fáil

Tiernan Brady is an Irish-Australian political and LGBT rights campaigner who was involved in the campaigns to allow same-sex marriage in Ireland and Australia. He was the executive director of the Equality Campaign in Australia, the successful national campaign for Australian Marriage Equality. He was the political director of Ireland's successful "Yes Equality" campaign which saw Ireland become the first country in the world to introduce marriage equality by a public vote. He was the Director of Gay HIV Strategies in GLEN – The Irish Gay and Lesbian Equality Network, and is Campaign Director of Equal Future 2018.

== Electoral politics ==
As a member of Fianna Fáil, Brady was elected to Bundoran Town Council in 1999 and re-elected in 2004. He twice served as council chair. In 2005 Brady introduced Ireland's first derelict property tax to address underdevelopment and hoarding of properties by developers.

As council chair, Brady proposed the creation of special coastal conservation zones to prevent residential zoning in areas of natural beauty. These proposals pitted him against councillors from his own party, Fianna Fáil, but they passed. In 2007 Brady let it be known that he would not stand again.

From 2000 to 2007 he served as Director of Organisation for Pat "the Cope" Gallagher, MEP and Mary Coughlan, TD.

In October 2013 Brady announced that he would seek to be the Fianna Fáil candidate in the Dublin constituency for the 2014 European elections but was unsuccessful.

In October 2018, Brady announced his intention to seek the Fianna Fáil nomination for the Dublin constituency in the European Parliament.

== Activism in Ireland ==
In 2009 Brady became Director of Gay HIV Strategies with GLEN – The Gay and Lesbian Equality Network. GLEN successfully lobbied to pass the Civil Partnership Act in 2011. In April 2013 Brady addressed the Constitutional Convention to argue for marriage equality. In 2012 he led the successful bid for Dublin to host the 15th Annual Conference of the International Lesbian and Gay Association – Europe (ILGA-Europe) and chaired the conference organising committee. The ILGA conference is the largest of its kind in Europe with delegates from over 40 countries attending.

In the summer of 2014, the Irish government announced that there would a referendum on marriage equality in May 2015. Yes Equality became the main campaign for the Yes side. In its first major activity Brady headed up the Register to Vote campaign aimed to increase enrolment in advance of the vote. The campaign was a huge success enrolling over 40,000 new voters making it the most successful enrolment campaign in the country's history.

Brady then became the Political Director of Yes Equality, working closely with political parties and political leaders from across the political spectrum to maximise and coordinate the impact of the campaign. The national campaign won with a 62% vote in favour of marriage equality making Ireland the first country in the world to have passed marriage equality by a public vote.

In March 2015, Brady launched Ireland's first community-based rapid HIV testing programme, the Knownow project. It became Europe's most successful testing programme of its kind.

== Activism in Australia ==
In 2016, Brady moved to Australia to work with Australian Marriage Equality. The government of Prime Minister Malcolm Turnbull proposed a national plebiscite on same-sex marriage. As Director of Australian Marriage Equality, Brady developed a strategy that opposed the plebiscite while preparing for it and sought to secure marriage equality through a parliamentary vote. He subsequently launched the Equality Campaign, a joint initiative of Australian Marriage Equality and Australians 4 Equality. The proposed plebiscite was rejected by the Australian Senate in November 2016. In 2017, the government instead established the Australian Marriage Law Postal Survey, administered through the Australian Bureau of Statistics.

Brady's campaign strategy emphasised fairness and equality, using personal stories and avoiding confrontational exchanges with opponents. He argued that the campaign should seek to persuade opponents rather than simply defeat them, and that social cohesion should remain a consideration alongside legal change.

The postal survey results, announced on 15 November 2017, showed 61.6% of respondents in favour of same-sex marriage, with majorities in every state and territory and in most parliamentary electorates. Brady addressed a crowd in Sydney following the result, calling for the outcome to be treated as a basis for national reconciliation and continued engagement with those who had voted against marriage equality. Australia subsequently became the second country, after Ireland, to approve marriage equality through a public vote.

== Humanitarian work for Equal Future 2018 ==
In 2018, Brady was a spokesperson for Equal Future 2018, an international campaign focused on the effects of LGBT stigma on children and young people. The campaign launched in Dublin on 22 August 2018 with the support of more than 100 LGBT organisations in over 60 countries. It encouraged people to submit personal accounts concerning LGBT stigma to delegates attending the Catholic Church's Fifteenth Ordinary General Assembly of the Synod of Bishops. Journalist Ursula Halligan participated in the launch, while former President of Ireland Mary McAleese had endorsed the campaign shortly beforehand.

Following the campaign's launch, Pope Francis was asked about how parents should respond to a son who says he is homosexual. He advised parents not to condemn their children, but to engage in dialogue, understand them, and allow them to express themselves within the family.

Brady subsequently launched an YouGov survey for Equal Future with Italian Senator Monica Cirinnà and former President of Apulia Nichi Vendola, among others. The survey examined attitudes in eight predominantly Catholic countries towards the effects of LGBT stigma on children and young people. The poll, covering Brazil, Mexico, the Philippines, the United States, France, Italy, Spain and Colombia, found that 50% of adults agreed that feeling that being LGBT was a misfortune or disappointment could damage a young person's mental health and well-being, while 23% disagreed. Among practising Catholics, 63% agreed that the Catholic Church should reconsider its approach to LGBT issues to support the mental health and well-being of children and young people.

== Personal life ==
Brady was born in Enniskillen, County Fermanagh and grew up in the Republic of Ireland in Bundoran, County Donegal. He studied at University College Dublin (UCD), where he became chairman of the Kevin Barry Cumann of Ógra Fianna Fáil.
