= Equal Future 2018 =

- Formation: 2018; 8 years ago
- Affiliations: Human Rights Campaign Foundation, GLAAD, Music4Children, All Out, Global Network of Rainbow Catholics, Gaingels, GLSEN, We Are Church, New Ways Ministry
- Website: www.equalfuture2018.com

Equal Future 2018 is "an international humanitarian campaign raising awareness of the damage done to children when they feel that being LGBT would be a misfortune or a disappointment, and aiming to shift behavior towards children and young people, across the world, right away".

The Campaign was launched at the World Meeting of Families 2018 of the Catholic Church as a faith group into which nearly 20% of the world's population is baptized. Its launch was promptly succeeded by advice from Pope Francis that parents of children who may be gay should dialogue, understand, make space for their son or daughter to express themselves, and say "You are my son, you are my daughter, just you are." Amongst other things, to date, the Campaign has provided a web platform for people to write to their territory's delegate to the Catholic Church's 'Synod on Young People', the Fifteenth Ordinary General Assembly of the Synod of Bishops, and it has commissioned an international poll by YouGov. The poll showed that in eight of the largest countries in the world – Brazil, Mexico, the Philippines, the USA, Italy, France, Colombia and Spain – substantially more people agreed than disagreed that it could be damaging to a child or young person's mental health and well-being if they felt that being LGBT was a misfortune or disappointment. The poll also showed that 63% of Catholics in those countries, the largest eight Catholic countries representing 50% of the world's Catholic population, agree that the Catholic Church should reconsider its teaching on LGBT to support the health and wellbeing of children and young people.

== Origins, formation and supporting organisations ==
On 13 January 2017 the Catholic Church released its Preparatory Document for its Fifteenth Ordinary General Assembly of the Synod of Bishops, whose theme was to be 'Young people, faith, and vocational discernment'. In it, the Vatican stated that their aim was to address issues facing "all young people, without exception" – i.e. not just Catholics - and to consult directly with them in preparation for the Synod itself, rather than solely via episcopal conferences. This was unprecedented, as while the Vatican's preparation for a synod generally includes developing a questionnaire and soliciting input from bishops' conferences, dioceses and religious orders, for the first time the Vatican's synod organizing body sought direct input from the public, even going so far as to put a questionnaire online.

Areas of focus covered in the document for solicitation of feedback and discussion at the Synod included "cultural and religious factors [which] can lead to exclusion". The document further spoke of the need, in "pastoral religious care", for "abandoning rigid attitudes" and emphasised that "by listening to young people, the Church will once again hear the Lord speaking in today’s world". It emphasised the need for the Church to listen openly stating that "young people know how to discern the signs of our times, indicated by the Spirit, " and that "in the task of accompanying the younger generation, the Church accepts her call to collaborate in the joy of young people rather than be tempted to take control of their faith (cf. 2 Cor 1:24)."

The humanitarian opportunity the Church's approach presented was spotted by Hugh Young, an entrepreneur with a background in helping companies with diversity and inclusion, and who set up the Campaign. He recruited Tiernan Brady, who had successfully led the marriage equality campaigns in both Ireland and Australia, to be Campaign Director, and raised funds on both sides of the Atlantic.

The Campaign is supported by a coalition of groups including the largest US civil rights advocacy group, HRC, American NGO GLAAD, US education organization GLSEN, political advocacy not-for-profit All Out, children's charity Music4Children, LGBT investment organisation Gaingels, the member organisations of the LGBT Catholic association Global Network of Rainbow Catholics and advocacy movement We Are Church, US ministry organisation New Ways Ministry, and others, amounting to over 100 organisations in more than 60 countries.

== Launch and response from the Pope ==
The Campaign launched in Dublin on Wednesday 22 August 2018 urging use of its website for people to tell their stories to delegates at the Catholic Church's 'Synod on Young People’. The press conference included Irish journalist Ursula Halligan and the Campaign had been endorsed to the press by former President of Ireland Mary McAleese two days before. The following Sunday, on his flight back from Dublin where the launch occurred, concluding his visit to Ireland, Pope Francis was asked what he would say to the father of a son who says he is homosexual. In his reply, the Pope said "Don’t condemn. Dialogue, understand, make space for your son or daughter. Make space so they can express themselves," "You are my son, you are my daughter, just as you are!" and "that son and that daughter have the right to a family and of not being chased out of the family."

== International poll results ==
The Equal Future 2018 Campaign commissioned a poll by YouGov on 'Attitudes in the Catholic world towards damage to children and young people from LGBT stigma'. It was conducted in Brazil, Mexico, the Philippines, the USA, France, Italy, Spain, and Colombia, whose combined populations comprise 13% of the population of the world. They are also the top eight countries of Global Catholicism by baptized Catholic population, together representing approximately 50% of the global baptized Catholic population of 1.285 billion people. YouGov reached representative samples in each country. A total of 9,606 people were surveyed.

The poll found that half of adults across the eight countries agreed with the statement "It could be damaging to a child/ young person's mental health and well-being if they felt that being LGBT was a misfortune or disappointment," while 23% disagreed. In every individual country, the proportion agreeing with the statement exceeded the proportion disagreeing.

Across all eight countries, 63% of practicing Catholics also agreed with the statement, "The Catholic Church should reconsider its current teaching on LGBT issues to help support the mental health and well-being of children and young people" while 16 percent disagreed. This compared to 65% of baptized Catholics (who may no longer be practicing) who agreed with the statement and 15% who disagreed. A total of 59% of the general population agreed – lower than the number of practicing Catholics.

Just over half of all adults across all eight countries, and 49% of practicing Catholics, agreed with the statement "The Catholic Church's current teaching on LGBT issues could cause a child/ young person to feel that being LGBT is a misfortune or disappointment," while 18% and 26% disagreed respectively.

== Poll launch and reception ==
The findings of the YouGov poll were launched in Rome on 10 October 2018 by Monica Cirinna, the Italian Senator who first introduced the Italian civil union bill in the Italian parliament, Nichi Vendola, the former President of Apulia, and others including Andrea Rubera and Roberto Geloso. The findings were submitted by the Campaign to Cardinal Lorenzo Baldisseri, General Secretary of the Synod of Bishops, so that they could be taken into consideration at the Synod on Young People. The results received press attention around the world.

== Letter to Pope Francis from United Kingdom MPs ==
Also in October 2018, four United Kingdom MPs, Mary Creagh (Lab), Conor McGinn (Lab), Mike Kane (Lab) and Sir David Amess (Con) wrote a letter to Pope Francis in support of the Equal Future 2018 Campaign, which was delivered by the United Kingdom Ambassador to the Holy See, Sally Axworthy. In their letter, they called on the Pope to ensure the Fifteenth Ordinary General Assembly of the Synod of Bishops worked towards undoing the damage Church teaching has done to young LGBT people, saying that the Synod offered the Church a "unique moment" to consider the impact that negative attitudes towards LGBT people – including some espoused by the Church – have had on children. Citing the problems that arise when children are caused to believe their sexuality will disappoint their parents, the MPs warned of "the role of the Church’s current teaching in their being given that sense". The Church, they said, ought to be at the fore of efforts to protect young LGBT people from "negative or ambivalent attitudes", and described the Synod as "a once-in-a-generation moment where we can all create positive change to young peoples' lives."

== Impact outside the Catholic world ==
The month after the launch of the Campaign and the Pope's response, Chief Rabbi of the United Hebrew Congregations of the Commonwealth Ephraim Mirvis, in guidance thought to be a world first, told Orthodox Jewish schools to be more tolerant of gay people.
