= Studies (journal) =

- Language: English
- Edited by: Dermot Roantree

Publication details
- History: 1912–present
- Publisher: Messenger Publications (Ireland)
- Frequency: Quarterly

Standard abbreviations
- ISO 4: Studies

Indexing
- ISSN: 0039-3495
- OCLC no.: 1036239016

Links
- Journal homepage

Studies: An Irish Quarterly Review is an Irish scholarly journal established in 1912, with its first issue published in March 1912. It is published by Messenger Publications for the Jesuits of Ireland. Its current editor, appointed in 2021, is Dr Dermot Roantree, of the Irish Jesuit Communications office. He is the first lay editor of the journal.

Other editors have included P. J. Connolly S.J. (from 1916 to 1950), Fergus O'Donoghue S.J. (2001–2011) and Bruce Bradley S.J. (2011–2021).

Founded in 1912, it was seen as a replacement for The New Ireland Review (1894–1911), and the earlier Lyceum (1887–1894). Among the founders were UCD Professors Thomas A. Finlay S.J. (Professor of Philosophy and Economics, who also founded the New Ireland Review and Lyceum) and Timothy Corcoran S.J. (Professor of Education). Alfred O'Rahilly, who was training to be a Jesuit, was also instrumental in its founding and contributed many articles to it.

== Contributors ==
Among the famous people who have contributed articles to the journal are former taoisigh Garret FitzGerald and Seán Lemass, and economists John Maynard Keynes, Peter Sutherland, and Ray Kinsella. Others include Prof. E. F. O'Doherty and poet Patrick Kavanagh.
