= Thirty-fourth Amendment of the Constitution of Ireland =

2015 amendment permitting same-sex marriage

- 22 May 2015
- To permit marriage to be contracted by two persons without distinction as to their sex

Results
Choice	Votes	%
Yes	1,201,607	62.07%
No	734,300	37.93%
Valid votes	1,935,907	99.29%
Invalid or blank votes	13,818	0.71%
Total votes	1,949,725	100.00%
Registered voters/turnout	3,221,681	60.52%
How the electorate voted, by constituency.
Proportion of the valid poll voting yes:
72.5%–75% 70%–72.49% 67.5%–69.99% 65%–67.49% 62.5%–64.99% 60%–62.49% 57.5%–59.99% 55%–57.49% 52.5%–54.99% 50%–52.49%	48.58%

The Thirty-fourth Amendment of the Constitution (Marriage Equality) Act 2015 (previously bill no. 5 of 2015) amended the Constitution of Ireland to permit marriage to be contracted by two persons without distinction as to their sex. Prior to the enactment, the Constitution was assumed to contain an implicit prohibition on same-sex marriage in Ireland. It was approved at a referendum on 22 May 2015 by 62% of voters on a turnout of 61%. This was the first time that a state legalised same-sex marriage through a popular vote. Two legal challenges regarding the conduct of the referendum were dismissed on 30 July by the Court of Appeal, and the bill was signed into law by the President of Ireland on 29 August. An amendment to the Marriage Act 2015 provided for marriages permitted by the new constitutional status. The act came into force on 16 November 2015; the first same-sex marriage ceremony was held on 17 November 2015.

== Changes to the text ==
The amendment inserted a new section 4 to Article 41 of the Constitution. The English text reads:

4. Marriage may be contracted in accordance with law by two persons without distinction as to their sex.

The Irish text reads:

4. Féadfaidh beirt, gan beann ar a ngnéas, conradh pósta a dhéanamh de réir dlí.

The text in Irish and English is intended to have the same meaning; in the event of a conflict, the Irish version takes precedence.

=== Original Irish wording ===
The Irish text of the amendment as introduced was:

4. Féadfaidh beirt, cibé acu is fir nó mná iad, conradh a dhéanamh i leith pósadh de réir dlí.

Journalist Bruce Arnold argued against the bill in two articles in The Irish Times, one of which focused on alleged issues with the Irish text. Arnold argued that the Irish text describes only same-sex couples, thus rendering opposite-sex marriage illegal. Government sources pointed out the words impugned by Arnold (beirt and cibé acu is fir nó mná) are already used with similar intent elsewhere in the constitution. Counterpoints from legal academics were that Arnold's strict constructionist interpretation would be trumped by the doctrine of absurdity, and that failure to mention opposite-sex marriage would not make it illegal. Some argued that the Irish text should nevertheless be changed to remove all doubts. Enda Kenny announced on 10 March 2015 that such a change would be made. Frances Fitzgerald moved the amendment in the Dáil the following day.

== Background ==
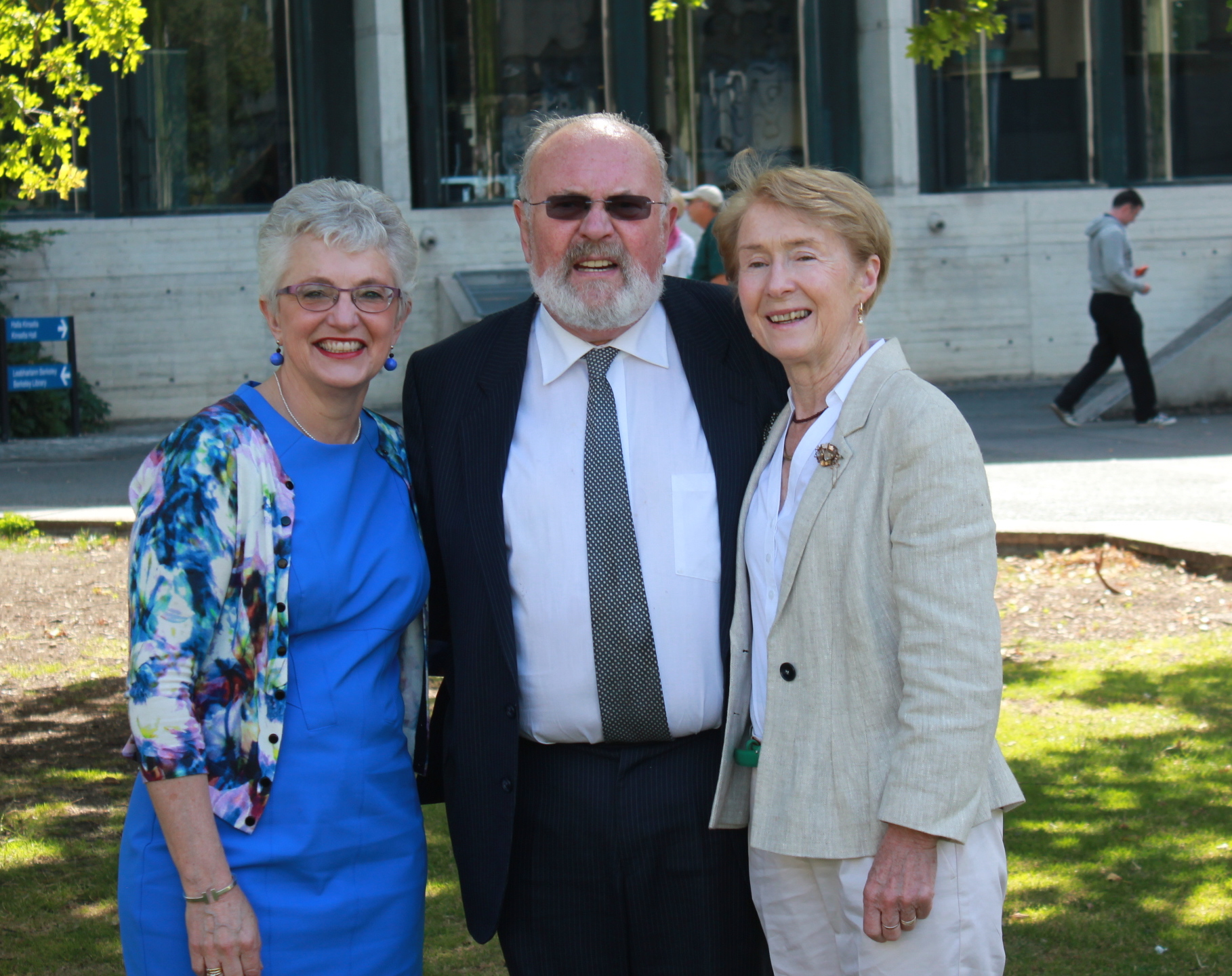
Katherine Zappone (left) and Ann Gilligan (right), with Senator David Norris

Katherine Zappone and Ann Louise Gilligan lost a case in the High Court in 2006 for the recognition by Ireland of their Canadian same-sex marriage. The Civil Partnership and Certain Rights and Obligations of Cohabitants Act 2010 instituted civil partnership in Irish law. After the 2011 general election, the Fine Gael and Labour parties formed a coalition government, whose programme included the establishment of a Constitutional Convention to examine potential changes on specified issues, including "Provision for the legalisation of same-sex marriage". The Convention considered the issue in May 2013 and voted to recommend that the state should be required, rather than merely permitted, to allow for same-sex marriage. Its report was formally submitted in July and the government formally responded in December, when Taoiseach Enda Kenny said a referendum would be held "no later than mid-2015". All amendments to the Irish constitution must be approved by the people in a referendum before becoming law.

Some legal academics claimed that extending marriage to same-sex couples did not require a constitutional amendment and could have been accomplished by an ordinary Act of the Oireachtas. Then-minister Shatter disagreed in November 2013, stating that there was "ample case law" to the effect that "marriage is understood as being between one man and one woman".

In January 2015, the wording of the proposed amendment was agreed at a special cabinet meeting and published in the press, and the bill was formally introduced in the Dáil by the Minister for Justice and Equality, Frances Fitzgerald.

A separate Children and Family Relationships Act 2015 was passed in April 2015. This included adoption rights for same-sex couples – prior to the passing of the Act, single gay or lesbian people, or one of the partners in a same-sex couple could adopt, but joint adoption by both partners was not possible. The general scheme of this bill was published for consultation in January 2014, and in 2015 it was passed by the Dáil on 12 March and the Seanad on 30 March, and signed into law on 6 April. As of May 2018 the legislation has only partially been commenced.

== Referendum ==
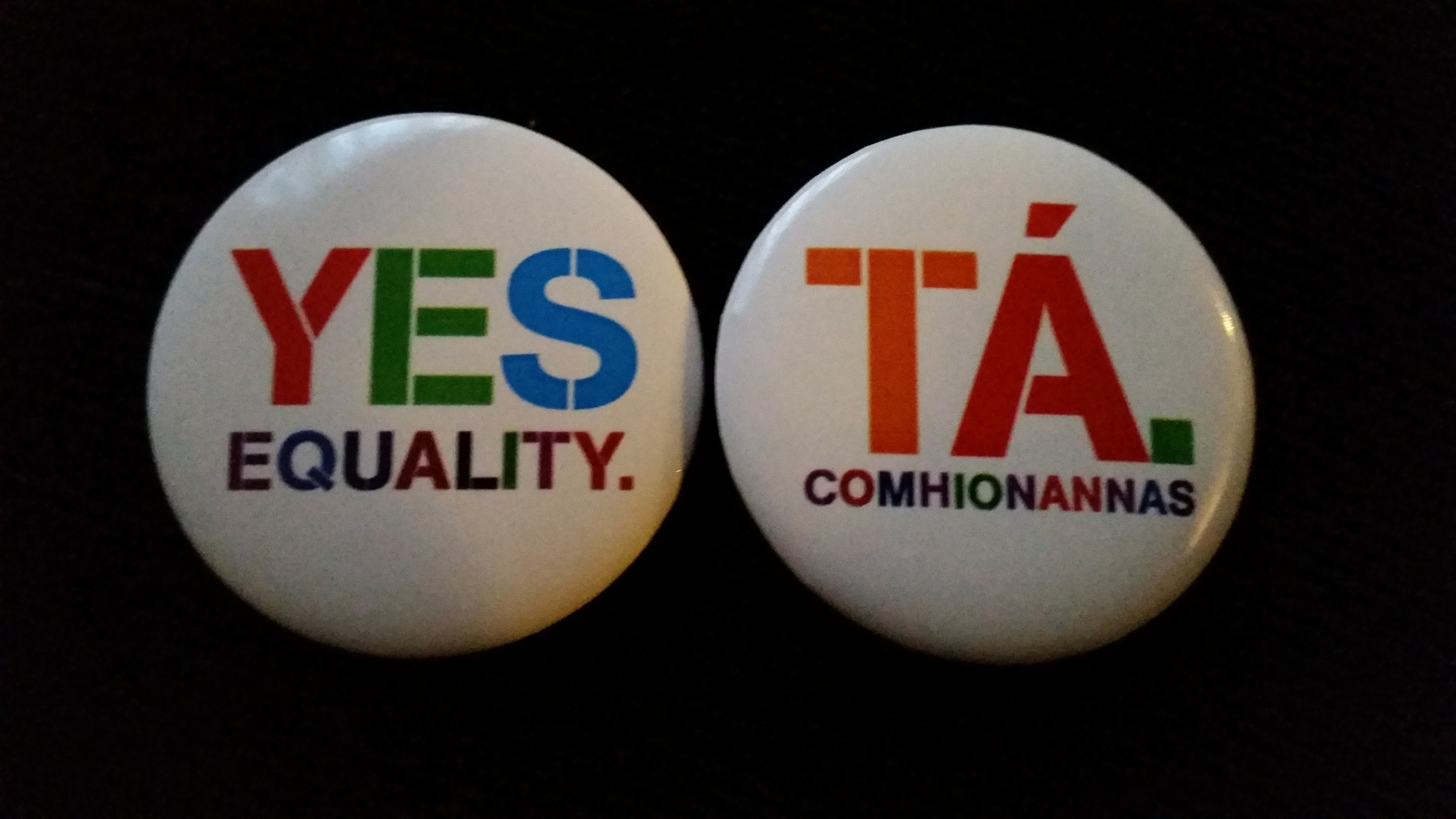
Badges, in English and in Irish, promoting the "yes" side in the referendum.

Two referendums were held on 22 May 2015, on the marriage bill and another constitutional amendment, to reduce the age of candidacy for the presidency. Referendums need a simple majority of the votes cast to pass. A Dáil by-election in Carlow–Kilkenny was held on the same day.

According to the Referendum Commission, if the referendum were to be passed:

- Two people of the opposite sex or of the same sex will be able to marry each other.
- The other detailed rules about who may marry will continue to be set out in legislation.
- The Constitutional status of marriage will remain unchanged.
- A marriage between two people of the same sex will have the same status under the Constitution as a marriage between a man and a woman.
- Married couples of the opposite sex or of the same sex will be recognised as a family and be entitled to the Constitutional protection for families.

== Debate ==
The "No" campaign raised surrogacy as an issue in the campaign, as on the upper poster by Mothers and Fathers Matter. The "Yes" campaign claimed this was irrelevant, as on the lower poster by Fine Gael.

=== Oireachtas debate ===
The Thirty-fourth Amendment of the Constitution (Marriage Equality) Bill 2015 was debated in the Dáil on 10 and 11 March 2015. Several deputies from different parties spoke in favour. The only speaker to oppose it was independent TD Mattie McGrath; it was passed without a division (i.e., by voice vote). It was then debated in the Seanad on 25 and 27 March. Votes were held on a number of proposed amendments, all of which were defeated, and the Bill was finally passed by 29 votes to three. Among those speaking in favour was Katherine Zappone, who was a Senator at the time. Those who voted against were Senators Rónán Mullen, Jim Walsh and Feargal Quinn; the opposition amendments were also supported by Senator Fidelma Healy Eames.

=== Organisations ===
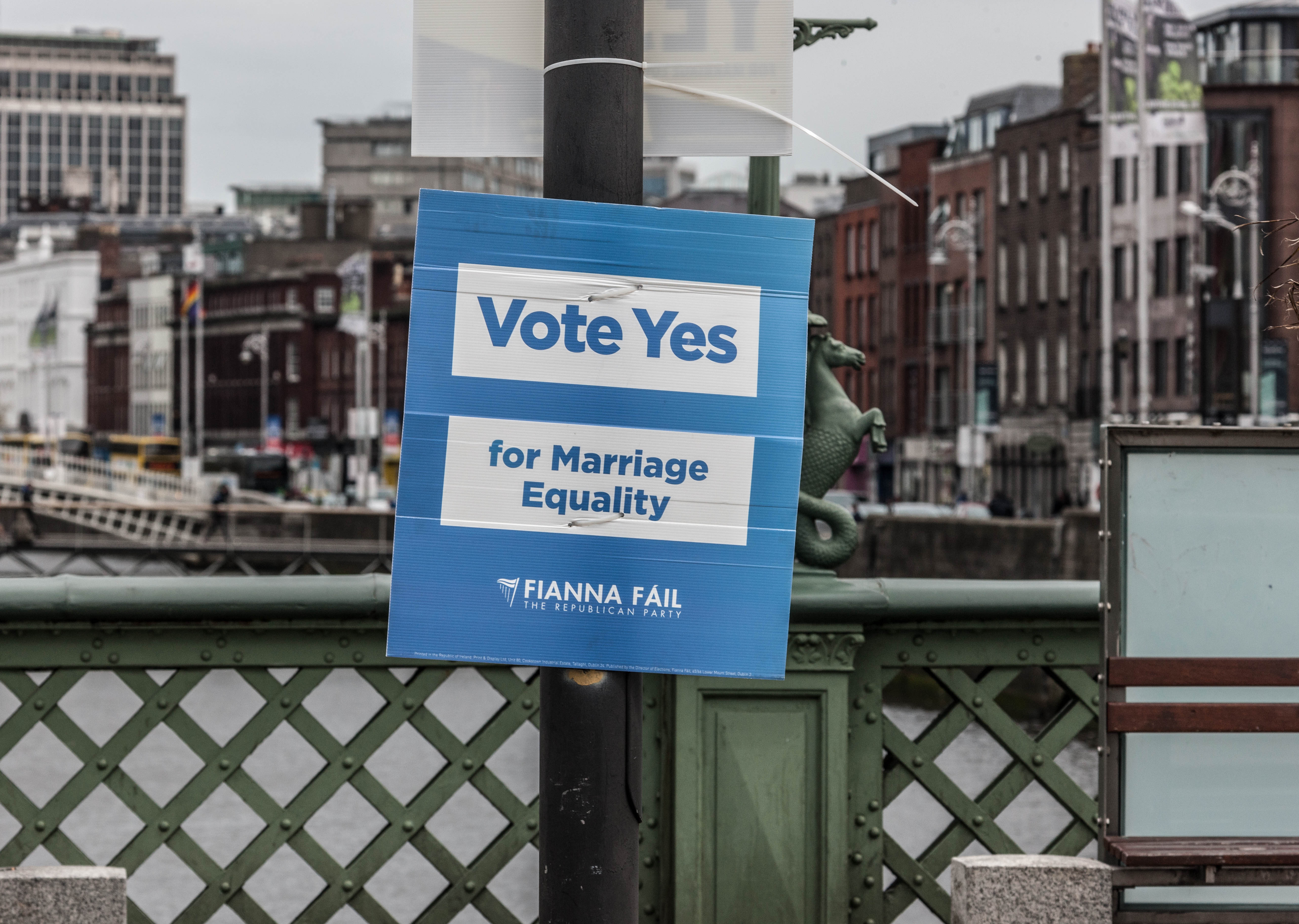
A Fianna Fáil poster in favour of the amendment

==== Political parties ====
All four main parties in the Dáil supported the bill: the governing Fine Gael and Labour, and the opposition Fianna Fáil and Sinn Féin. Members of the Green Party, Anti-Austerity Alliance, People Before Profit Alliance, Workers' Party and independents are also on record in support of the amendment. "Yes Equality" was an umbrella campaign by Gay and Lesbian Equality Network (GLEN), the Irish Council for Civil Liberties and Marriage Equality.

==== Religious bodies ====
Religious bodies in Ireland officially adopted a range of stances to the referendum, though the official church positions were either neutral or in opposition.

===== Catholic Church =====
The Catholic Church did not take an official position on the referendum and the Pope did not make any direct comments on his stance. However, there were a number of bishops and priests that shared differing views publicly.

In the lead up to the referendum, Archbishop Diarmuid Martin confirmed that while he planned to vote No, he was not affiliated with any No campaign and had "never told people how to vote" and encouraged "everyone to vote and to reflect carefully". Shortly before the referendum, Eamon Martin urged Catholics to reflect on their decision but avoided telling members how to vote.

In December 2014 the Irish Catholic Bishops' Conference shared their opposition on same-sex marriage, and distributed a booklet to all parishes. The Bishops' document stated that marriage "provides for the continuation of the human race and the development of human society". It posited that same sex marriage would "redefine the nature of marriage" and "undermine it as the fundamental building block of our society." When the document was launched, the Bishop of Clogher Liam MacDaid shared that the intention was to outline the "Christian understanding of marriage.". However the interest of a Church in a No vote was called into question by some, with the Irish Catholic noting only 10% of Irish Catholics were expected to receive the leaflet.

Opposition to same sex marriage was not a view universally held within the Irish Catholic clergy and The Irish Times reporting that there was "significant disquiet" from parish clergy about the impact of the bishops stance on gay people and on the church.

From January onwards, a number of Catholic priests started to publicly express disappointment with the approach taken by the bishops in opposing same sex civil marriage and/or support of a Yes vote. In January Fr. Martin Dolan, Roman Catholic priest at the Church of St Nicholas of Myra came out to his congregation and called on their support in voting Yes in the referendum. Augustinian Catholic priest Fr. Iggy O' Donovan shortly followed in openly declaring his intention to vote for same-sex marriage. Writing in a national newspaper he shared that while churches can have different views and variations of those views, in referendums "we legislate for ALL our fellow citizens". He encouraged others to "remember the difference between civil and religious law." Later speaking to the Irish Independent, he expressed that while he believed in "Catholic teaching on marriage", following years of pastoral work with gay Catholics, he felt that other peoples different views should be respected, and he should not be imposing his own on them. He also said we should be sensitive to get things right, referencing the scandal surrounding Cardinal Keith O' Brien who had been one of the loud proponents against homosexuality and same sex marriage, but later faced allegations of sexual misconduct from fellow priests and was reported to have been in a long-term same-sex relationship.

In March 2015 the Association of Catholic Priests, representing more than 1000 Irish priests, declared it would not take a position in the referendum. This decision was taken following member consultation with a released statement saying "The ACP asserts the particular responsibility that devolves on priests to measure their words carefully, and not to direct their parishioners to vote Yes or No."

In May the Catholic Bishops Conference shared a message entitled 'Care for the Covenant of Marriage’ where Archbishop Eamon Martin reiterating the bishops position on the referendum. In this message he said "The Irish bishops have already said that we cannot support an amendment to the Constitution which redefines marriage and effectively places the union of two men, or two women, on a par with the marriage relationship between a husband and wife which is open to the procreation of children." Eamon Martin did not explicitly call for a No vote but expressed concerns about the consequence of a Yes vote.

As the referendum drew closer, more priests shared their support for a Yes vote including Fr. Gerald Moloney who wrote of his intention in the Irish Times. He expressed that while he viewed marriage as a sacrament he felt "citizens of the State" could decide "how they define marriage and who can enter it". Gweedore priest Fr. Brian Ó Fearraigh announced his support for a Yes vote, making the decision as he felt the referendum gave "statutory recognition and protection to the relationships of people regardless of their sex". As more priests announced their intentions to vote Yes, the Washington Post reported on the growing number of Irish priests coming out against the stance of the church leadership in Ireland.

===== Church of Ireland =====
The Church of Ireland announced in February 2015 that it would not be taking a stance on the referendum, instead encouraging members to vote according to their conscience. A spokesperson for the church said that while marriage between one man and one woman was the "basis on which the Church's liturgy for marriage is used" the Church "also recognises that a state has a duty and responsibility to legislate for its citizens". He encouraged members of the Church to vote "when the State consults on matters, such as the civil definition of marriage."

Two Church of Ireland bishops had publicly called for a Yes vote. As early as May 2014, Paul Colton, Church of Ireland Bishop of Cork, Cloyne and Ross, had signalled his support for a yes vote. He was joined by the Rt Revd Michael Burrows of Cashel, Ferns & Ossory in April 2015. Speaking at the School of Ecumenics at Trinity College he said "...all too often we have allowed ourselves to be left behind defending the essentially indefensible". He declared his intention to vote yes for same sex marriage, saying it would be "a contribution to a fairer and more truly equal Ireland" and "I cannot see any way in which it could be considered repugnant to the common good, or indeed to the vital role of the family". The Rev Canon Ginnie Kennerley, who had been the first woman cathedral canon in Ireland, also supported a Yes vote, saying there were "conflicts between factuality and scripture". She said "There has always been disagreement on what is and is not permitted by the bible," and mentioned these conflicts had always existed "...over the flat earth, over slavery, over evolution, over apartheid, over the position of women."

In March 2015 Ferran Glenfield, an evangelical Church of Ireland bishop, signalled his support for a No Vote in the referendum.

On 7 May, at a Changing Attitude Ireland event, former Archdeacon of Dublin, Gordon Linney said "We are being given an opportunity on May 22 finally to show the gay community that we value them for who they are. We welcome them as they are fully into society and so give them the recognition they are entitled to and that those who are in stable relationships and wish to marry should be allowed to do so. Marriage is a civil contract. No church will be forced to solemnise any union it does not approve of."

===== Presbyterian Church =====
On 22 April 2015, the leaders of the Presbyterian Church in Ireland issued a statement advocating a no vote, saying "the change proposed in the same-sex marriage referendum denies the rights of children and the natural responsibilities of a father and a mother in nurturing them".

===== Islam in Ireland =====
On 15 April a petition was initiated by religious groups including the Islamic Cultural Centre of Ireland, the Irish Council of Imams, and the Galway branch of the Reformed Presbyterian Church on 15 April called for a "conscience clause", this which would allow individuals and businesses to discriminate against same-sex couples in the provision of goods and services. In response, Taoiseach Enda Kenny said: "The Government has made its decision very clear here in respect to the question that the people will be asked on the 22nd of May. That question of course is to give their approval, if they see fit and I hope they do, to allow for marriage in civil law irrespective of sexual orientation." Labour TD Brendan Howlin said "The one issue at the core of this referendum is equality under the Constitution and anything else is extraneous."

The Islamic Centre in Ireland issued a statement on the referendum 17 April stating that "As Muslims we must believe in equality and inclusiveness. People should not be discriminated for any reason. It is important to humanise people and not to de humanise. The Islamic tradition teaches to hate the sin but not the sinner. The attitude of some Muslims towards homosexuals is incompatible with the spirit of mercy and kindness in Islam. The Irish constitution guarantees all Irish citizens the freedom of conscience and Muslims must exercise this right when voting on 22nd May 2015."

===== Methodist Church =====
In February 2015, the Methodist Church in Ireland issued a statement supporting the traditional view of marriage as being between a man and woman.

===== Inter-Faith and Lay Organisations =====
In December 2015, Dr. Richard O'Leary of Church of Ireland LGBT group Changing Attitude Ireland challenged the Catholic Bishops Conference definition of marriage saying that "view of marriage as being essentially about reproduction rather than being primarily a loving stable relationship was contrary to how many Christians understood their own marriages.” In January, the group welcomed the publication of the wording of the Referendum text saying that marriage should be "available to couples without distinction as to their sex", just as civil marriage "may be contracted by two persons without distinction as to their race or religion". Changing Attitude had been one of the first groups to welcome the referendum back in May 2014, then noting that "In the forthcoming referendum on marriage Christians will be campaigning on both sides".

In January 2015, Irish lay Catholic group We Are Church Ireland gave its "unanimous support" for a Yes vote in the referendum. They stated that "loving, committed relationships between two consenting adults should be treated equally by the Irish State, regardless of gender or sexual orientation." Spokesperson Brendan Butler shared "The proposed referendum will not redefine marriage but rather refine it to make it more inclusive and so enhance the meaning of marriage".

In February 2015, the Faith in Marriage Equality (FiME) group was founded. This inter-faith coalition group included Changing Attitudes Ireland, We Are Church Ireland and Gay Catholic Voice Ireland to represent people of faith voting Yes in the referendum. Richard O' Leary representing Changing Attitude Ireland said "So far we haven’t heard the voices of people of faith saying that they will be voting yes and that this is consistent with their faith's values. "Our understanding of faith is that marriage is based on love and commitment and this is the case for heterosexual and same-sex couples." Retired Archdeacon Gordon Linney joined the launch event to call for a Yes vote. Calling it a "civil matter" he said "Personally, I think the claim of the churches to own marriage in any sense just doesn't stand up because marriage was there long, long before there was ever a Christian church."

The Iona Institute, a right-wing conservative mainly-Catholic religious think tank, also opposed the amendment.

In Match 2015, a cross-denominational group issued a leaflet urging a No vote. Approximately 50 clergy and lay signed the leaflet, including Bishop of Elphin Kevin Doran (Roman Catholic Church), Bishop of Kilmore, Elphin and Ardagh Ferran Glenfield, and Archdeacon of Raphoe David Huss (both Church of Ireland); along with clergy and lay from the Methodist, Presbyterian and various Pentecostal churches.

==== Business opinion ====
Many business groups advocated for the passing of the referendum. On 16 April, Business for Yes Equality launched, with high-profile companies such as Twitter, eBay, PayPal and 150 Irish-based international and local companies joining. Stephen McIntyre, MD of Twitter in Ireland, said "As I see it, this case has three key elements. First, people perform better in the long run when they can be themselves. Second, talent is attracted to organisations which demonstrate an appreciation for diversity, inclusiveness and equality. Finally, Ireland's international reputation as a good place to do business will be enhanced by a Yes vote." Martin Shanahan, the head of IDA Ireland, the Industrial Development Authority, called for a Yes vote on 1 May, saying "A Yes vote on May 22 would tell the business world that Ireland is open, inclusive and welcomes diversity and that would be a very positive message to be sending internationally." He also said he believed that a No vote would send a negative signal to international businesses.

Also on 1 May, the Irish Congress of Trade Unions announced its support for the Yes campaign with the launch of its "Trade unions for civil marriage equality" campaign. Other trade unions and staff representative associations supporting a Yes vote included the Garda Representative Association, Mandate, and Ireland's largest trade union SIPTU.

On 7 May, eBay CEO John Donahoe announced that the company was backing a Yes vote. Donahoe said that its position on equality issues such as same-sex marriage, in addition to being "the right thing to do", also helps the company attract, retain and develop the right people.

==== Other organisations ====
Other prominent groups to support the referendum included a coalition of Ireland's main children's charities called "BeLonG To Yes". Constituent organisations include the ISPCC, Barnardos, Foróige, Youth Work Ireland, the Migrant Rights Centre, Headstrong, Yes Equality, the Children's Rights Alliance, Pavee Point, EPIC and the National Youth Council of Ireland. Speaking at the launch, Fergus Finlay said they had come together to call for a Yes vote in part because groups within the No campaign were "using children as pawns" and that every time he saw a poster calling for a No vote because "every child deserves a mother and father", he saw "a sickening insult to the thousands of lone parents and children who love and care for each other in Ireland. The message is exploitative, hurtful and dishonest. What every child deserves is love, respect, safety. That can come from two parents of either sex, two parents of the same-sex, or a single parent." The Union of Students in Ireland, then led by Laura Harmon, launched its "Students for Marriage Equality" campaign in January together with its dedicated website, voteforlove.ie.

Amnesty International launched their "Let's Make History" campaign for marriage equality on 22 March 2015 to thousands of people outside the historic General Post Office, Dublin. Speakers included Colm O'Gorman, Pat Carey, Sabina Brennan, Gavin Brennan and Grace Dyas.

On 5 May, the "Yes for Health" campaign was launched by Liam Doran, general secretary of the Irish Nurses and Midwives Organisation and Kieran Ryan, CEO of the Irish College of General Practitioners. Speaking at the launch, Minister for Health Leo Varadkar said that a No vote would be a "big step backwards" for the country, and that it would have an adverse effect on the mental health of members of the LGBT community. The following day, the National Women's Council of Ireland and launched their 'Yes' campaign. The launch was attended by representatives of various groups, including the Irish Feminist Network, Digi Women and the Association of Childcare Professionals. On 7 May, the Law Society of Ireland announced its support for a Yes vote. Ken Murphy, the society's Director General, said that the society was taking a public stance because marriage equality was an issue of fundamental human rights. The decision followed a report from the society's human rights committee, which found that there were 160 ways in which civil partnership, compared to civil marriage, was the lesser of the two unions.

Some groups were also formed in opposition to the referendum. On 18 April, Mothers and Fathers Matter, formed in 2014 to oppose the Children and Family Relationships Bill, launched its No campaign. First Families First, a group of three people headed by disabilities campaigner and former politician Kathy Sinnott, and former columnist John Waters launched its campaign for a No vote on 1 May. On 7 May, a group called StandUp4Marriage launched. Its founder, Senator Jim Walsh said the launch was sparsely attended because people who want to vote no are afraid to speak out. Mandate for Marriage was established in March 2015. It advocated a no vote.

==== Oversight bodies ====
The following organisations registered as "approved bodies" to monitor postal voting and vote counting: Comhar Críostaí, Marriage Equality, Yes Equality Cork, Green Party, Mothers & Fathers Matter, Fianna Fáil, Labour Party, BeLonG To Youth Services, Irish Council for Civil Liberties, GLEN Campaign for Marriage, National LGBT Federation, Sinn Féin, and Fine Gael.

=== Broadcasting ===
Broadcasters are legally required to cover referendum campaigns in a balanced manner. Several complaints were made to the Broadcasting Authority of Ireland (BAI) that programmes and presenters had unfairly favoured the Yes side. The BAI rejected these in its October 2015 report.

=== Opinion polls ===
Opinion polls on issue of same-sex marriage or voting intention in marriage referendum
Publication date	Excluding other (Note: Other includes don't know, undecided, or refused to answer)		Including other			Polling org.	Commissioned by	References
Publication date	Yes (%)	No (%)	Yes (%)	No (%)	Other (%)	Polling org.	Commissioned by	References
17 May 2015	73	27	69	25	6	Red C	The Sunday Business Post	
17 May 2015	71	29	63	26	11	Behaviour & Attitudes	The Sunday Times	
17 May 2015	69	31	53	24	23	Millward Brown	Sunday Independent	
16 May 2015	70	30	58	25	17	Ipsos MRBI	The Irish Times	
7 May 2015	—N/a		78	16	6	Amárach Research	RTÉ – Claire Byrne Live	
25 April 2015	78	22	72	20	8	Red C	The Sunday Business Post	
17 April 2015	—N/a		77	14	9	Amárach Research	RTÉ – Claire Byrne Live	
27 March 2015	74	26	—N/a			Ipsos MRBI	The Irish Times	
24 January 2015	77	22 (Note: Of the 77% who were in favour in this January 2015 poll, 33/77 had "some reservations about same-sex marriage", and 29/77 had "some reservations about adoption by gay couples".)	—N/a			Red C	The Sunday Business Post	
8 December 2014	81	19	71	17	12	Ipsos MRBI	The Irish Times	
13 October 2014	76	24	68	23	9	Ipsos MRBI	The Irish Times	
April 2014	76	24	67	21	12	Ipsos MRBI	The Irish Times	
20 February 2014	80	20	76	19	5	Red C	The Sunday Business Post / Prime Time	
7 November 2013	81	19	76	18	6	Red C	Paddy Power	
November 2012	64	36	53	30	17	Ipsos MRBI	The Irish Times	

==== Notes ====
A 2014 poll showed that support was strongest among younger voters, and that Sinn Féin and Labour voters were somewhat more in favour than Fine Gael and Fianna Fáil.

== Result ==
Counting began at 09:00 IST on 23 May (08:00 UTC). Early tallies quickly began to indicate a victory for the Yes campaign, with Minister of State Aodhán Ó Ríordáin declaring a "landslide" victory across Dublin only 8 minutes into counting. Key figures in the No campaign, including David Quinn began conceding defeat as early as 10:00, long ahead of any constituencies declaring their final count.

Urban regions generally recorded higher approval ratings for the change. The highest Yes percentages were recorded in County Dublin with all of the top ten by Yes vote percentage being in the city and county (with a total Yes vote of 71% for the region), and all of the top 15 located in the Greater Dublin Area. Cork's urban constituencies also ranked above the national average, as did Limerick city. Although the Donegal constituencies had been expected to return a No vote, — and indeed, of all constituencies reporting a majority Yes vote, the lowest margin was recorded in Donegal South-West, where a Yes vote was carried by a margin of only 33 votes — Roscommon–South Leitrim was the only constituency to return a majority No vote.

The HomeToVote hashtag on Twitter, used by emigrant voters indicating their intent to return to Ireland to vote yes, was globally the fifth biggest trending topic of the year.

=== National result ===
The national results were as follows:

Thirty-fourth Amendment of the Constitution (Marriage Equality) Bill 2015
Choice	Votes	%
For	1,201,607	62.07
Against	734,300	37.93
Total	1,935,907	100.00
Valid votes	1,935,907	99.29
Invalid/blank votes	13,818	0.71
Total votes	1,949,725	100.00
Registered voters/turnout	3,221,681	60.52

National referendum result (excluding invalid votes)
Yes: 1,201,607 (62.07%)	No: 734,300 (37.93%)
▲

=== Constituency results ===
Results by constituency
Constituency	Electorate	Turnout (%)	Votes		Proportion of votes	
Constituency	Electorate	Turnout (%)	Yes	No	Yes	No
Carlow–Kilkenny	104,735	65.43%	38,166	29,697	56.24%	43.76%
Cavan–Monaghan	99,265	57.19%	28,494	27,763	50.65%	49.35%
Clare	81,809	59.44%	28,137	20,154	58.27%	41.73%
Cork East	81,534	60.90%	30,383	18,845	61.70%	38.30%
Cork North-Central	75,263	59.87%	28,479	16,182	63.77%	36.23%
Cork North-West	62,118	62.80%	22,388	16,298	57.90%	42.10%
Cork South-Central	92,422	63.86%	38,591	20,072	65.78%	34.22%
Cork South-West	59,813	61.70%	20,627	16,225	56.00%	44.00%
Donegal North-East	59,721	51.44%	16,040	14,492	52.46%	47.54%
Donegal South-West	62,171	51.98%	15,907	15,874	50.05%	49.95%
Dublin Central	57,193	57.98%	23,861	9,108	72.37%	27.63%
Dublin Mid-West	67,091	63.39%	29,984	12,291	70.93%	29.07%
Dublin North	72,523	65.83%	34,494	13,009	72.61%	27.39%
Dublin North-Central	53,785	68.85%	25,382	11,431	68.95%	31.05%
Dublin North-East	59,549	66.38%	26,222	13,090	66.70%	33.30%
Dublin North-West	50,943	59.64%	20,919	8,814	70.36%	29.64%
Dublin South	103,969	69.24%	49,109	21,150	69.90%	30.10%
Dublin South-Central	80,406	60.56%	34,988	13,418	72.28%	27.72%
Dublin South-East	59,376	58.02%	25,655	8,594	74.91%	25.09%
Dublin South-West	71,232	63.41%	32,010	12,901	71.27%	28.73%
Dublin West	65,643	64.36%	29,690	12,350	70.62%	29.38%
Dún Laoghaire	80,176	67.05%	38,284	15,168	71.62%	28.38%
Galway East	85,900	56.01%	25,389	22,265	53.28%	46.72%
Galway West	95,180	55.18%	32,037	20,053	61.50%	38.50%
Kerry North–West Limerick	62,523	57.21%	19,678	15,808	55.45%	44.55%
Kerry South	57,524	58.19%	18,357	14,831	55.31%	44.69%
Kildare North	79,014	62.05%	33,960	14,782	69.67%	30.33%
Kildare South	60,384	58.41%	23,199	11,861	66.17%	33.83%
Laois–Offaly	108,436	58.37%	35,685	27,135	56.81%	43.19%
Limerick	64,100	58.51%	20,322	16,797	54.75%	45.25%
Limerick City	61,421	63.30%	24,789	13,855	64.15%	35.85%
Longford–Westmeath	87,425	54.77%	25,445	22,025	53.60%	46.40%
Louth	102,561	59.92%	38,758	22,313	63.46%	36.54%
Mayo	97,296	57.48%	28,801	26,566	52.02%	47.98%
Meath East	64,956	59.68%	24,525	14,025	63.62%	36.38%
Meath West	63,649	56.28%	21,374	14,189	60.10%	39.90%
Roscommon–South Leitrim	59,392	61.49%	17,615	18,644	48.58%	51.42%
Sligo–North Leitrim	62,031	57.78%	19,043	16,502	53.57%	46.43%
Tipperary North	62,233	62.50%	22,077	18,298	54.68%	45.32%
Tipperary South	56,060	59.30%	19,203	15,012	54.69%	45.31%
Waterford	79,669	59.37%	28,313	18,620	60.33%	39.67%
Wexford	111,474	57.82%	40,692	23,298	63.59%	36.41%
Wicklow	94,275	68.77%	44,059	20,384	68.37%	31.63%
Total	3,206,151	60.52%	1,201,607	734,300	62.07%	37.93%

== Reactions ==
=== Domestic ===
Dublin Castle, where the result of referendum was officially announced, was opened to the public for the duration of the count, with numbers limited to 2,000 at any one time. A carnival atmosphere prevailed all day after early count tallies indicated that the result would be a Yes. Celebrations and street parties took place at many venues in cities around Ireland, with Dublin celebrations centred between gay venues Pantibar and The George, and Dublin Castle.

Taoiseach Enda Kenny said "With today's Yes vote we have disclosed who we are – a generous, compassionate, bold and joyful people. The referendum was about inclusiveness and equality, about love and commitment being enshrined in the constitution. The people have spoken. They have said yes. Ireland – thank you."

Tánaiste Joan Burton described Ireland as a "rainbow nation" and said "In Ireland, we are known as a nation of storytellers and today, the people have told quite some story. Together, the people of Ireland have struck a massive blow against discrimination as we extend the right of marriage to all our citizens." Leo Varadkar, Minister for Health and Ireland's first openly gay cabinet minister, said "It is a historic day for Ireland. We are the first country in the world to enshrine marriage equality in our constitution and to do it through popular mandate. That makes us a beacon of equality and liberty to the rest of the world, so it's a very proud day for the Irish people."

Micheál Martin, Fianna Fáil leader and Leader of the Opposition, who supported the amendment, said "there is something in the DNA of Irish people that reacts to inequality", adding "It is something that Irish people do not accept historically and I believe this ballot is a vote in favour of a more inclusive, equal and just society." However, Senator Averil Power resigned from Fianna Fáil after the referendum, alleging that many of its TDs and Senators had refused to canvass or leaflet for a Yes vote, and that its low profile in the Yes campaign was "cynical and cowardly".

The leader of Sinn Féin, Gerry Adams, said "We have a new era of equality and that is a good day for Ireland."

Veteran gay and civil rights campaigner, Senator David Norris, who was one of the key figures in having homosexuality decriminalised, said "I think it's wonderful. It's a little bit late for me. As I said the other day, I've spent so much time pushing the boat out that I forgot to jump on and now it's out beyond the harbour on the high seas, but it's very nice to look at."

Katherine Zappone, the first openly lesbian member of the Oireachtas, proposed remarrying her wife on air.

Diarmuid Martin, the Roman Catholic Archbishop of Dublin told RTÉ that the church needed a "reality check." He said "I appreciate how gay and lesbian men and women feel on this day. That they feel this is something that is enriching the way they live. I think it is a social revolution." He added "I ask myself, most of these young people who voted yes are products of our Catholic school system for 12 years. I'm saying there's a big challenge there to see how we get across the message of the Church". However, asked about the referendum on RTÉ during his retirement in 2023 he reflected "The church has got so caught up in the dogmatic rights and wrongs, absolute rights and wrongs, that it's lost the context." He also reflected "if the church appears only as a rule book, then they have lost Christianity. That isn't what Christianity is about."

Following the result, the Association of Catholic Priests (ACP) co-founders and leadership team made a number of statements showing support for the outcome of the referendum. This included leadership team member Fr. Gerry O’ Connor who said he saw the legislation as "catching up with people's lives" and that "the Irish people should be proud". Fr. Iggy O' Donovan, an Augustinan priest said he was "absolutely delighted" with the result. The association also expressed disappointment with the hard position taken by the bishops, with Fr. Tony Flannery saying it was "in total opposition" to the movement from younger generations, who should be listened to instead of being driven away with pastorals. He felt Diarmuid Martin had "allowed himself to be bullied by the extreme conservative Catholic papers into adopting the same rigid line as the other bishops". Fellow co-founder of the ACP Fr. Brendan Hoban said that the result showed "the gap between the church and a significant number of its people... It is so out of tune with the needs of the people" and that the church needed to adapt, and cannot expect its teaching to be in the law of the land.

The Church of Ireland issued a statement indicating that it "defines marriage as between a man and a woman, and the result of this referendum does not alter this." The Archbishops and bishops also called for "a spirit of public generosity, both from those for whom the result of the referendum represents triumph, and from those for whom it signifies disaster".

The Presbyterian Church in Ireland said it was "deeply disappointed and saddened that the Constitution will no longer reflect the historic – and Christian – view of marriage that it is exclusively between one man and one woman."

=== International ===
- United Nations Secretary General Ban Ki-moon, in Ireland to receive the Tipperary International Peace Award, described the referendum result as "truly historic" and said that "The result sends an important message to the world: All people are entitled to enjoy their human rights no matter who they are or whom they love."
- Australia – Australian supporters of marriage equality expressed the hope that "the result in Ireland would have a positive impact on the marriage equality debate in Australia", with Opposition Leader Bill Shorten asking "If the Irish people can vote in favour of marriage equality, the question has to be asked, what is Tony Abbott's problem with it?", but both Shorten and Prime Minister Tony Abbott agreed that the issue should be dealt with by the Federal Parliament rather than by a referendum. Despite this initial position, the country ended up holding its own public vote in the Australian Marriage Law Postal Survey, with Tiernan Brady playing a key role in the "Yes" campaign.
- Canada – Political leaders in Canada, which first recognized same-sex marriages in 2005, welcomed the result and congratulated the Irish people; including Premier of Ontario Kathleen Wynne, the first openly gay leader of a province in Canada, and federal Leader of the Official Opposition Tom Mulcair.
- Germany – German opposition parties called on Chancellor Angela Merkel's grand coalition government to legalise same-sex marriage. Katrin Göring-Eckardt, co-leader of the Greens in the Bundestag, said "It's time, Frau Merkel", adding that the Irish vote was a "great signal: the same love deserves the same respect" and that she was confident that Germany would soon follow. Jens Spahn, a Roman Catholic and the first openly gay member of the ruling council of Merkel's CDU party, said that "what the Catholic Irish can do, we can do, too".
- Italy – Prime Minister Matteo Renzi was quoted by La Repubblica as stating that debate on civil unions in Italy could no longer be put off in the wake of Ireland's approval. Figures including Democratic Party leader Roberto Speranza and President of the Chamber of Deputies Laura Boldrini praised Ireland's approval and called for Italy to follow.
- United Kingdom – Prime Minister David Cameron stated on his website 'My heartfelt congratulations to the people of Ireland, who have voted today to introduce same-sex marriage. Just over a year ago, we introduced same-sex civil marriage and sent out a clear message – you are equal whether you are straight or gay' The result was also praised by other politicians from across the political spectrum, including an early day motion in the House of Commons signed by members from the Conservative Party, Scottish National Party, Plaid Cymru, Social Democratic and Labour Party and the Labour Party. A few commentators such as Saeed Kamali Dehghan and Ronan Marron argued that letting the majority vote by referendum to grant or withhold the fundamental rights of a minority is wrong in principle, and can also set a dangerous precedent for less tolerant countries. The contrary case was put by Michael Angland, who argued that the 'national conversation' created by the referendum was a more effective way of combatting prejudice than a 'quick-fix parliamentary vote'.
  - Northern Ireland – Deputy First Minister Martin McGuinness called for a referendum to be held in Northern Ireland as well. Politicians from several parties, such as Alliance Party of Northern Ireland and the Social Democratic and Labour Party praised the result. The day the result was announced the Northern Ireland branch of Amnesty International announced a march in Belfast "on June 13 calling for legislation for same-sex marriage in the North", with its programme director Patrick Corrigan describing Northern Ireland as "now the last bastion of discrimination against gay people in these islands". But the most recent of four attempts at legislation received the support of only four Unionist MLAs in an Assembly that, under the terms of the Good Friday Agreement, requires the Cross-community support of majorities of both Unionist and Nationalist MLAs for legislation to succeed if at least 30 MLAs present a "Petition of Concern" to the Speaker.
  - Scotland – First Minister Nicola Sturgeon wrote on Twitter "It's official. Well done Ireland, I bet there will be a few marriage proposals in the pubs of Dublin tonight. What a lovely thought. Enjoy the celebrations, Ireland".
- United States – The result was welcomed by many senior Democrats, including Vice-President Joe Biden; Presidential candidate, former First Lady, and former Secretary of State Hillary Clinton; Irish-born US ambassador to the United Nations Samantha Power and former presidential candidate Martin O'Malley.
- Vatican – The Vatican and the Pope did not officially comment on the result of the referendum. In apparent response to Archbishop Diarmuid Martin's statement, a Vatican cardinal, Pietro Cardinal Parolin (the Cardinal Secretary of State) was reported in English language media as saying that the result was "a defeat for humanity" and he "was deeply saddened by the result". "The church must take account of this reality, but in the sense that it must strengthen its commitment to evangelisation. I think that you cannot just talk of a defeat for Christian principles, but of a defeat for humanity" However the official nuncio (Papal ambassador) to Ireland challenged the accuracy of this translation saying "I believe he was speaking in Italian . . . so he didn’t actually say that." On explaining why he did not speak on the referendum he also said "it's not the role of an ambassador from any nation to comment on matters of political decision in the country where he’s representing his own country".

Under the Referendum Act 1994, the returning officer issued a provisional certificate of the referendum result to the Master of the High Court and published a notice in Iris Oifigiúil, the official gazette. Citizens have seven days in which to lodge a petition challenging the result. If no petition is upheld, the provisional certificate is certified as final by the Master of the High Court and the bill is sent to the President of Ireland to be signed into law, thereby amending the constitution. Two petitions against the marriage referendum were rejected in the High Court in June and the Court of Appeal in July, after which the bill was signed by President Michael D. Higgins on 29 August 2015.

=== Petitions ===
The provisional referendum certificate was issued on 25 May 2015 and published the following day in Iris Oifigiúil. Two separate petitions challenging the certificate were lodged within the time limit and considered in the High Court on 5 June 2015. The petitioners, Gerry Walshe and Maurice J. Lyons, were lay litigants. Walsh argued that political parties receiving state funding should have been prohibited from campaigning; that copies of the amendment should have been available at post offices; and that the secrecy of the ballot was compromised by serial numbers on ballot papers and CCTV cameras in some polling stations. Lyons argued that the amendment is too vaguely worded and incompatible with the constitution's Christian ethos and reference to "woman ... in the home"; and also that non-voters should have been counted as no-voters. Nicholas Kearns, President of the High Court, dismissed both applications and awarded costs against the petitioners. Walshe and Lyons appealed the decisions, and on 29 June the Court of Appeal scheduled hearings for 30 July. On 30 July the court upheld the dismissals and the costs awards against both petitioners. The remaining steps were as prescribed by the Referendum Act 1994: on 24 August the High Court's Master formally notified the referendum returning officer Ríona Ní Fhlanghaile that it had not accepted any petition; on 28 August Ní Fhlanghaile sent the final referendum certificate to the Taoiseach and President; on 29 August the President signed the amendment into law.

Meanwhile, on 27 August, both Walshe and Lyons applied to the Supreme Court to overturn the Court of Appeal decision, although neither sought a stay on the Master or returning officer's actions, and their applications did not prevent the bill being signed into law. On 16 September, the Supreme Court refused leave to appeal, stating neither applicant had raised any points of substance. The Supreme Court criticised the decision to finalise the referendum certificate before it had made its decision; however, the High Court on 23 September rejected a claim by Walshe that the certificate was therefore invalid. The President's office and the Department of the Environment also stated they had acted in accordance with the law. The Master of the High Court said the problem arose because the Referendum Act 1994 did not take account of the Court of Appeal, created in 2014 under the Thirty-third Amendment of the Constitution. Lecturer Conor O'Mahony suggested the Master, though not obliged to wait for a Supreme Court appeal, might better have chosen to do so. The Supreme Court suggested that the applicants' failure to request a stay on the Court of Appeal decision pending request for a Supreme Court Appeal was a consequence of their being lay litigants, and that a professional lawyer would not have made such an omission.

=== Implementation ===
In March 2015, the Department of Justice and Equality published the general scheme of the Marriage Bill 2015, setting out the changes to be made to marriage law if the proposed amendment was enacted. These include removing the current legislative bar on same-sex couples marrying, allowing foreign same-sex marriages to be registered in Ireland as marriages rather than as civil partnerships, and dissolving a civil partnership if the partners marry each other. Authorised solemnisers of marriage from religious groups would be allowed to refuse to officiate at same-sex ceremonies. Lawyer Benedict Ó Floinn felt the bill's drafting should have been completed before the referendum, to minimise the lacuna during which statute law is out of step with the constitution. The Gender Recognition Act 2015 requires a transgender person to be unmarried to recognise a change of legal sex; the Marriage Bill intends to remove this restriction.

The government hoped to have the Marriage Bill enacted before the Oireachtas' summer adjournment, but the referendum petition hearings in the Court of Appeal delayed this. The government intended to enact the Marriage Bill "as early as possible" after the Dáil's resumption on 22 September 2015. The bill provides that applications for civil partnership pending when it comes into force can be converted into applications for marriage. The Minister for Justice stated that marriages under this provision should take place by November. The bill was approved at a cabinet meeting on 16 September for publication the following day. It passed its final stage in the legislature on 22 October 2015 and (in the absence of the President, who was out of the country) was signed into law on 29 October 2015 by the Presidential Commission.

The Marriage Act 2015 came into force on 16 November 2015. The first same-sex marriage ceremony was the next day in Clonmel, County Tipperary.

=== Popular culture ===
In the aftermath of the referendum several artistic interpretations took place. In 2016, A Day in May by Charlie Bird told the stories of individuals impacted by the referendum. In 2018, sections of this publication were used as part of a play by the same name in the Olympia Theatre, Dublin. In 2017, the play A Morning After The Life Before was first performed, the play was based on playwright Ann Blake experience before and after the referendum.

== See also ==
- Same-sex marriage

=== Other same-sex marriage referendums ===
- 2017 Australian Marriage Law Postal Survey
- 2016 Bermudian same-sex union and marriage referendum
- 2013 Croatian constitutional referendum
- 2015 Slovak same-sex marriage referendum
- 2015 Slovenian same-sex marriage referendum
- 2021 Swiss same-sex marriage referendum
- 2022 Cuban Family Code referendum
- United States:
  - Maine:
    - 2009 Maine same-sex marriage referendum
    - 2012 Maine same-sex marriage referendum
  - 2012 Maryland same-sex marriage referendum
  - 2012 Washington same-sex marriage referendum
