= Gluckman =

Gluckman is a surname. Notable people with the surname include:

- Max Gluckman (1911–1975), South African and British social anthropologist
- Mary Gluckman (1917–1990), Italian linguist and anthropologist
- Peter Gluckman (born 1949), New Zealand Chief Science Advisor to the Prime Minister

== See also ==
- Gluckman Tang Architects, a New York City-based architecture firm
