= Caherkinmonwee Castle =

Tower house in County Galway, Ireland

- Caisleán Chathair Chinn Mhaonmhaí (Irish)
- Caher Castle
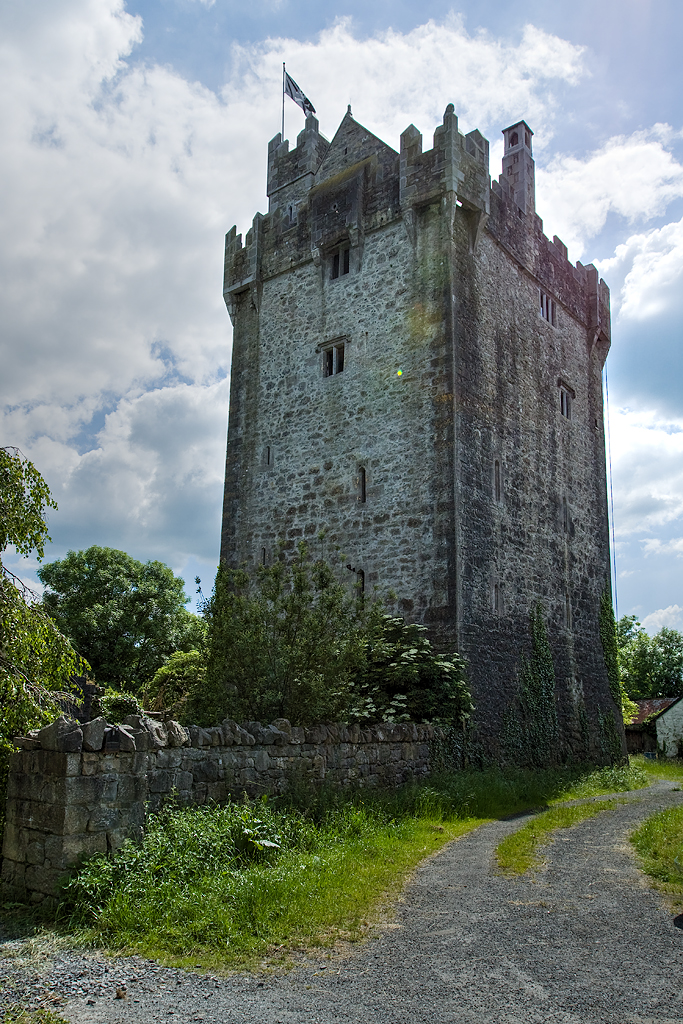
- The castle covered with a painting by Joe Caslin to promote a Yes vote in the 2015 gay marriage referendum.

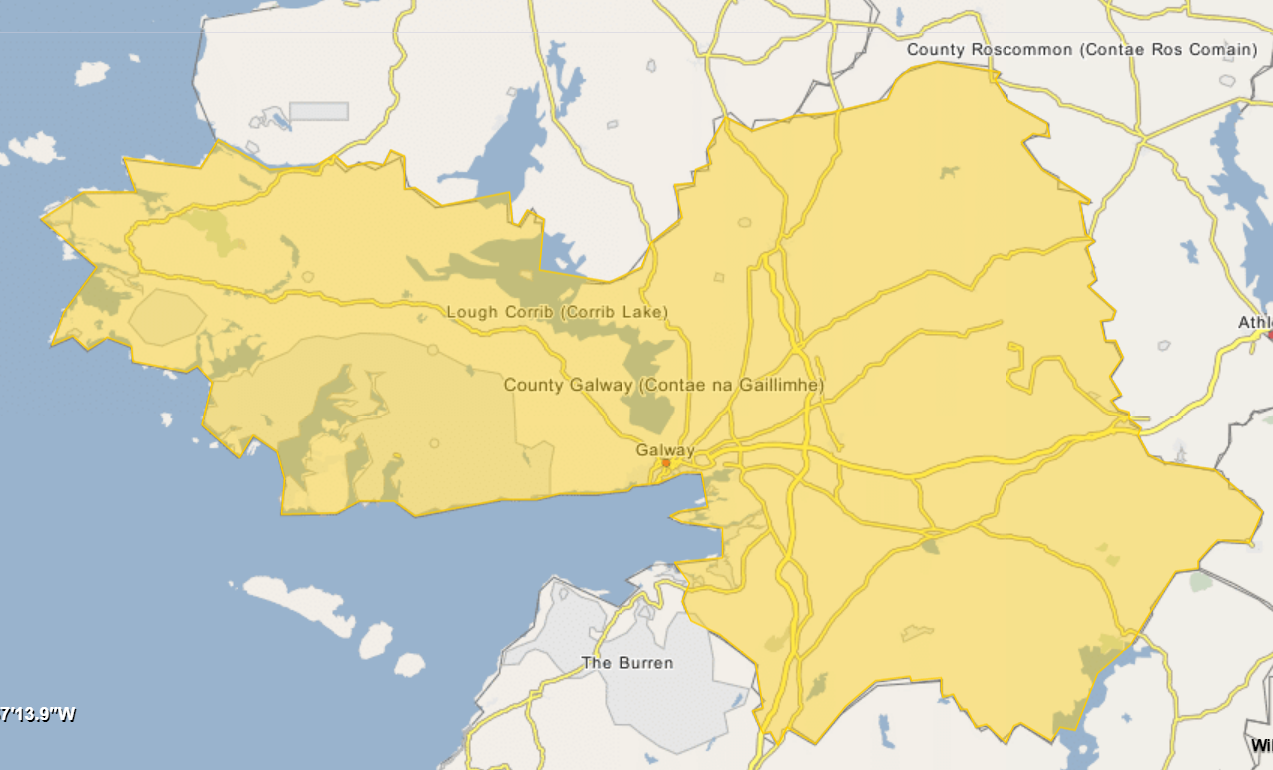
- Location within County Galway Location within Ireland
- 53°14′13″N 8°41′41″W
- Type: tower house
- Location: Caherkinmonwee, Craughwell, County Galway, Ireland

History
- Built: 15th century

Site notes
- Owner: Peter Hayes

Caherkinmonwee Castle, also known as Caher Castle, is a tower house located in County Galway, Ireland.

== Location ==
Caherkinmonwee Castle is 7.5 km (4.7 mi) southeast of Athenry, on the north bank of the Dunkellin River.

== History ==
The tower house was built some time in the 15th century. In 1574 it was held by Myler Henry Burke.

According to the School's Collection, a stone weighing 150 kg (330 lb) was blown off the top of the castle on the Night of the Big Wind (1839); it landed on an iron gate 100 yd (91 m) away and crushed it.

It was in ruins for two centuries until 1996, when stonemason and artisan Peter Hayes purchased and renovated it; he still lives there with his partner and children. It is now available as an Airbnb rental, with the castle's master bedroom described as the most popular room on the website.

== Description ==
The tower house is well-preserved and stands five storeys tall, with bartizans on each corner and a spiral staircase in the southeast. It has machicolation and Irish crenellations. The new roof was built with local oak, slate and no nails.
