= Yes Equality campaign =

LGBTQ rights campaign in Ireland

Yes Equality: The Campaign for Civil Marriage Equality, was a civil campaign in Ireland formed to promote the "Yes" vote in the 2015 referendum for Thirty-fourth Amendment of the Constitution of Ireland, which would allow same-sex marriage.

== Background ==
Until 1993, homosexuality was criminalized in Ireland under the Offences Against the Person Act 1861 and the Criminal Law Amendment Act 1885 carried over as a remnant of British rule. The Campaign for Homosexual Law Reform was founded by openly-gay Senator David Norris in the 1970s to campaign for its decriminalization. Norris and other activists, including two future female presidents of Ireland, Mary McAleese and Mary Robinson, brought the case to the European Court of Human Rights who ruled against in favour of Norris. In 1993, the Minister for Justice Máire Geoghegan-Quinn repealed the laws.

In 2006, theologian Ann Louise Gilligan and future TD Katherine Zappone lost their High Court case where the couple sought the recognition of their Canadian marriage.

The Civil Partnership and Certain Rights and Obligations of Cohabitants Act 2010 was passed by the Dáil allowing for Civil union between same-sex couples.

After the 2011 Irish general election, Fine Gael, led by Enda Kenny and Labour formed a government. The government pledged to hold a referendum on Same-sex marriage by the end of its term.

== Campaign ==
The campaign was a joint initiative between multiple Irish LGBTQ rights groups including the Gay and Lesbian Equality Network (GLEN), who had help push through the Civil Partnership and Certain Rights and Obligations of Cohabitants Act 2010, the Irish Council for Civil Liberties, which focused on broader civil liberties, and Marriage Equality, a group specifically dedicated to the issue of same-sex marriage. Its campaign director was Irish-Australian LGBTQ rights campaigner and Director of Gay HIV Strategies with GLEN, Tiernan Brady.

They launched their first campaign, Register to Vote, launched in October 2014, in cooperation with student movements and trade unions, such as the Aontas na Mac Léinn in Éirinn. It encouraged people to register to vote for the upcoming referendum. The campaign was among some of the most successful in Ireland's history enrolling some 40,000 new voters to register by the campaign's end on 25 November.

Yes Equality cooperated with political parties throughout the campaign. The Labour Party viewed this as one of their keystone points. Leadership from both groups met regularly to discuss cooperation. Members of the movement also met with multiple government officials including then-Minister for Agriculture, Food and the Marine, Simon Coveney, and Taoiseach Enda Kenny.

It had also received endorsements from other politicians including Tánaiste Joan Burton, Fianna Fáil leader Micheál Martin, Sinn Féin leader Gerry Adams. Other supporters include Colin Farrell, Dara Ó Briain, Hozier, The Script, Damien Dempsey, Gay Byrne and Duncan Casey.

The referendum passed with 62% of the vote on the 22 May 2015, making it the first country in the world to legalize same-sex marriage through public vote with a majority in all but one (Roscommon-South Leitrim) constituencies. Yes Equality and supporters of the referendum held a public celebration attended by multiple public figures in Dublin Castle as the votes were being counted and announced.

== Legacy ==
The referendum was the first of its kind to be held. However, many followed after it including Slovenia in 2015, Australia in 2017, Switzerland in 2021 and Cuba in 2022.

Brady later moved to Australia to work with Australian Marriage Equality. He campaigned for the legalisation of same-sex marriage in Australia and help push for the Australian Marriage Law Postal Survey which voted in favour of same-sex marriage.

In 2025, the National Library of Ireland launched an online photographic archive of over 1,000 pictures taken during the campaign to celebrate ten years of marriage equality.

== See also ==
- The Claddagh Embrace
- LGBT rights in the Republic of Ireland
- List of LGBT rights organisations
