= Child Law Project =

Statutory body researching child law in Ireland

The Child Law Project, (known as the Child Care Law Reporting Project (CCLRP) until 2022; Irish: Tionscadal Tuairiscithe an Dlí um Chúram Leanaí) is an Irish statutory body established to produce research and journalism. The body sent court reporters to relevant proceedings, including prosecutions of minors, in Irish courts from 2012 to 2024, compiling regular reports.

== History ==
The project was established in 2012, under the Child Care (Amendment) Act 2007, with seeding provided by the One Foundation, Atlantic Philanthropies and the Department of Children and Youth Affairs. Family law proceedings in the Republic of Ireland take place in camera, the project follows such cases in the Family Courts. Board members include Dublin Rape Crisis Centre's Noeline Blackwell (chair), and former Chief Justice Frank Clarke, Carol Coulter, an Irish Times journalist and adjunct professor of law at University of Galway, founded the project and is its executive director.

Reports from the project have been cited in academic journals such as the Journal of Social Work Education (Taylor & Francis), Social Work & Social Sciences Review (Whiting & Birch), Irish Journal of Applied Social Studies (TU Dublin), Child Abuse Review (Wiley), Journal of Social Welfare & Family Law (Taylor & Francis), Child & Family Social Work (Wiley) and Family Court Review (Wiley). In November 2024, Special Rapporteur-for Children, Caoilfhionn Gallagher, said that a report from the project "shines a light" on the care system in need of reform.

The body failed to secure a tender in 2024. In October 2024, District Court President Paul Kelly expressed concern at the closure of the project, which had not sent reporters to proceedings since the middle of the year. Opposition politicians, Paul Murphy, Labour Party leader Ivana Bacik, and Aontú leader Peadar Tóibín called for funding to be reinstated from the Department of Children, Equality, Disability, Integration and Youth.
