= Frederic William Burton =

Artist, Director of National Gallery (1816–1900)

Sir Frederic William Burton
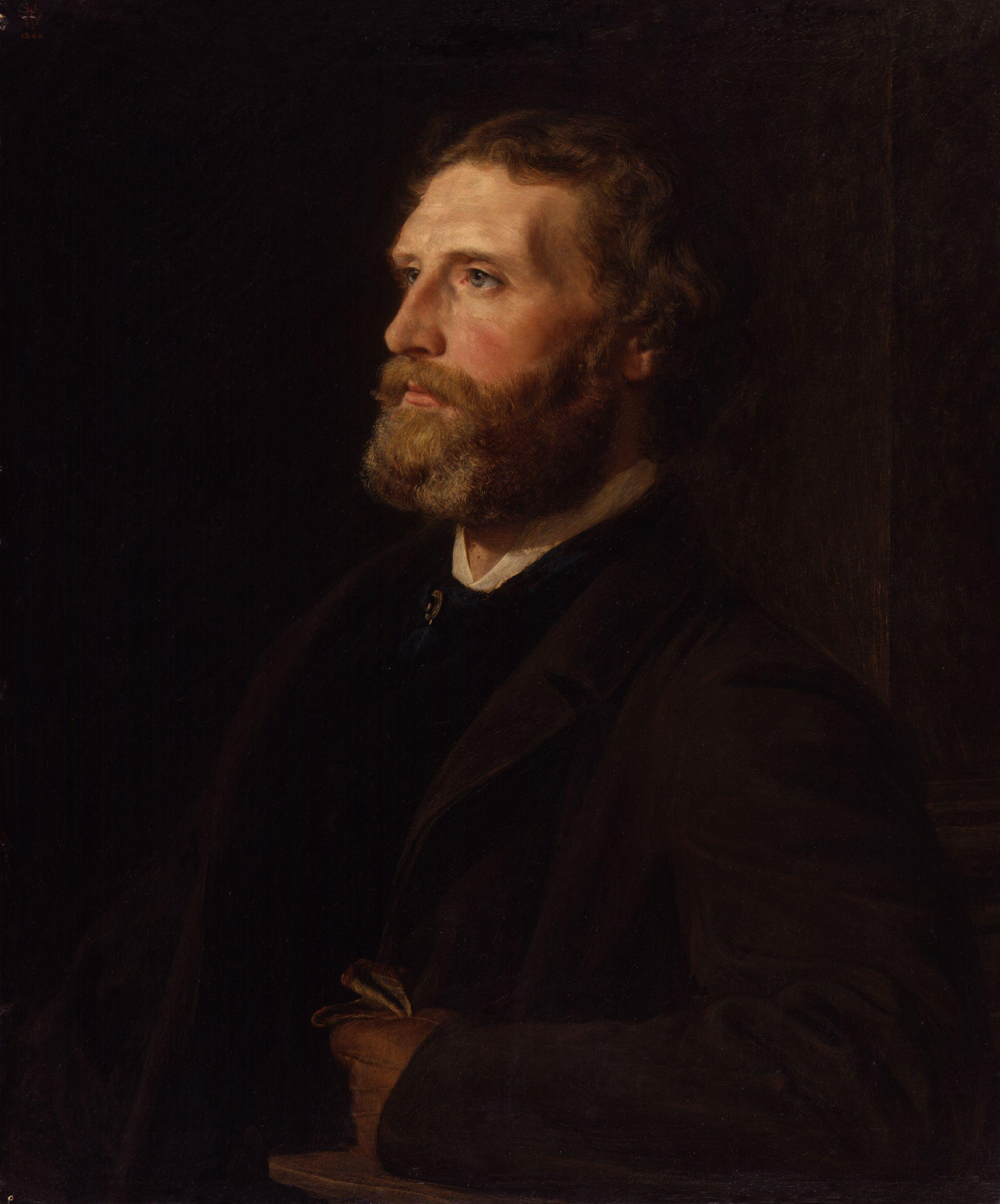
- Painting of Sir Frederic William Burton by Henry Tanworth Wells, 1863
- Born: 8 April 1816; County Wicklow, Ireland
- Died: 16 March 1900 (aged 83); London

Sir Frederic William Burton RHA (8 April 1816 in Wicklow – 16 March 1900 in London) was an Irish Victorian painter, mainly in watercolour, and curator who was the third director of the National Gallery, London for 20 years from 1874.

Burton's best-known watercolours, The Aran Fisherman's Drowned Child (1841) and The Meeting on the Turret Stairs (1864; also known as Hellelil and Hildebrand) are in the National Gallery of Ireland. Meeting on the Turret Stairs was voted by the Irish public as Ireland's favourite painting in 2012 from among 10 works shortlisted by critics.

== Biography ==
He was born in County Wicklow and taken by his parents to live in County Clare on the west coast of Ireland at the age of six. He was the third son of Samuel Frederick Burton and his wife, Hanna Mallett.

The old Burton seat was Clifden House, Corofin, County Clare, which was built around the middle of the eighteenth century. The artist's grandparents were Major Edward William Burton, Clifden, who was High Sheriff of Clare in 1799, and his wife, Jane Blood of the nearby townland of Roxton, County Clare.

=== Artistic career ===
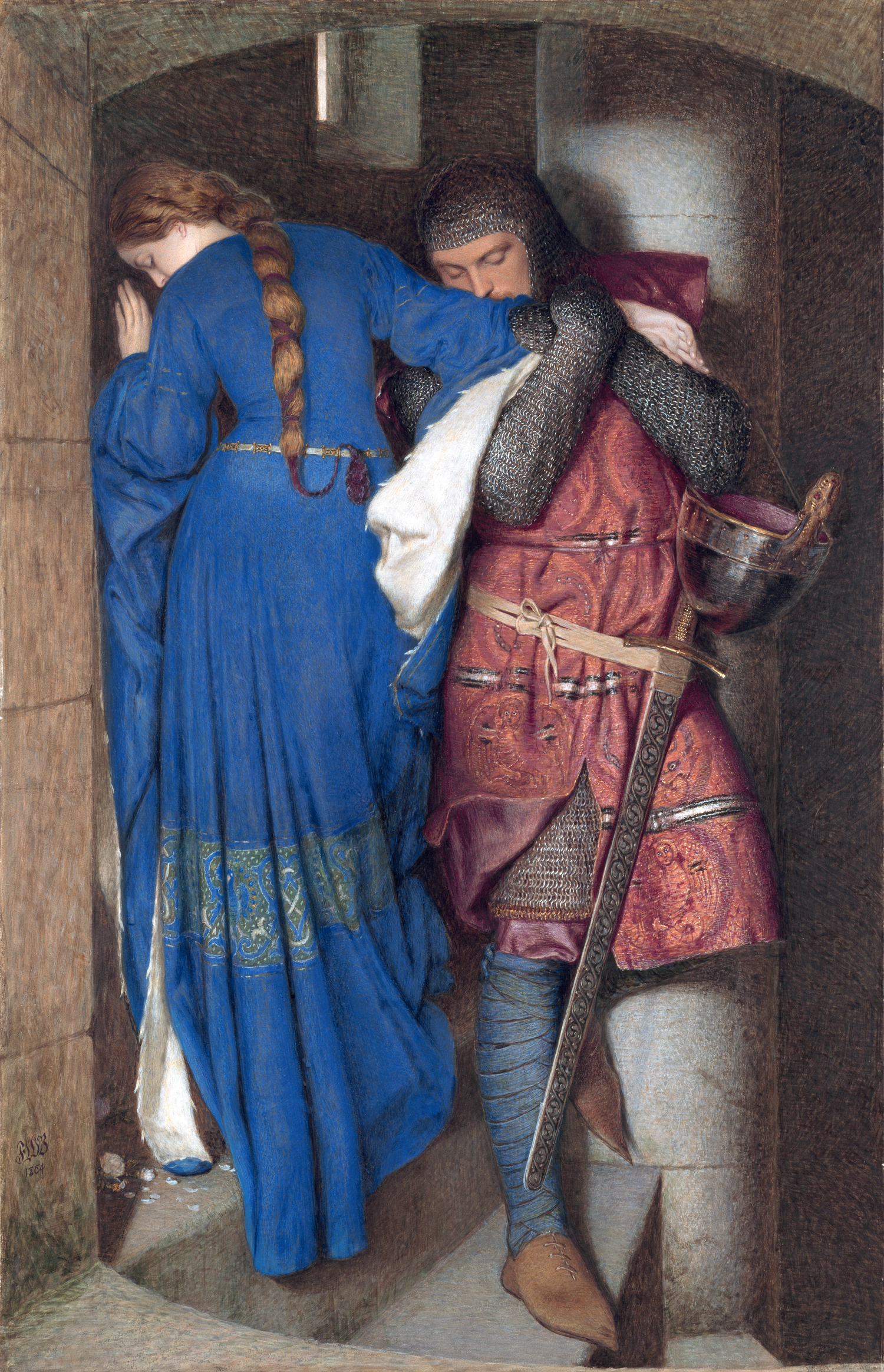
The Meeting on the Turret Stairs, watercolour, 1864, National Gallery of Ireland, Dublin

Educated in Dublin, he was elected an associate of the Royal Hibernian Academy at age 21, and an academician two years later. In 1842, he began to exhibit at the Royal Academy. A visit to Germany and Bavaria in 1842 was the first of a long series of trips to various parts of Europe, which gave him a profound knowledge of the works of the Old Masters. From 1851, he spent 7 years working as a painter in the service of Maximilian II of Bavaria.

Burton worked with George Petrie on archaeological sketches and was on the council of the Royal Irish Academy and the Archaeological Society of Ireland.

He was elected an associate of the Royal Society of Painters in Watercolours in 1855, and a full member in the following year. He resigned in 1870, and was reelected as an honorary member in 1886. A knighthood was conferred on him in 1884, and the degree of LL.D. of Dublin in 1889. In his youth he had strong sympathy with the Young Ireland Party. He died in Kensington, west London and is buried in Mount Jerome Cemetery, Dublin.

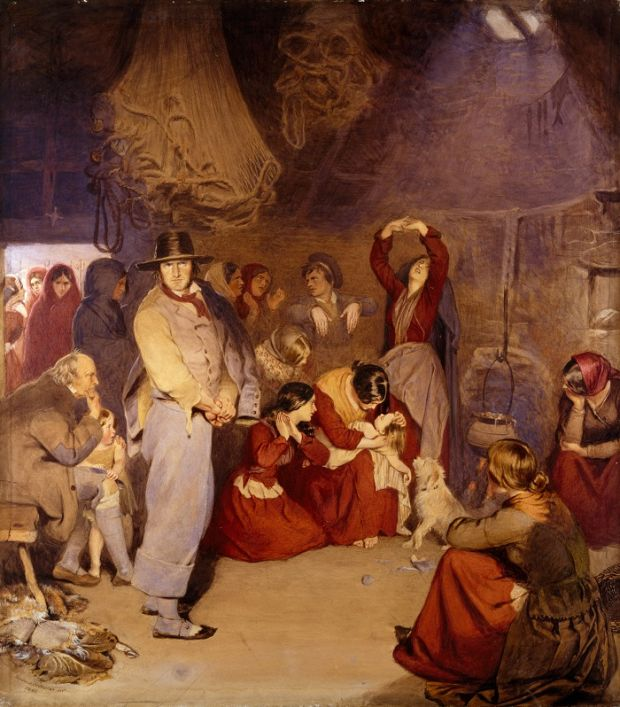
The Aran Fisherman's Drowned Child, 1841, National Gallery of Ireland, Dublin

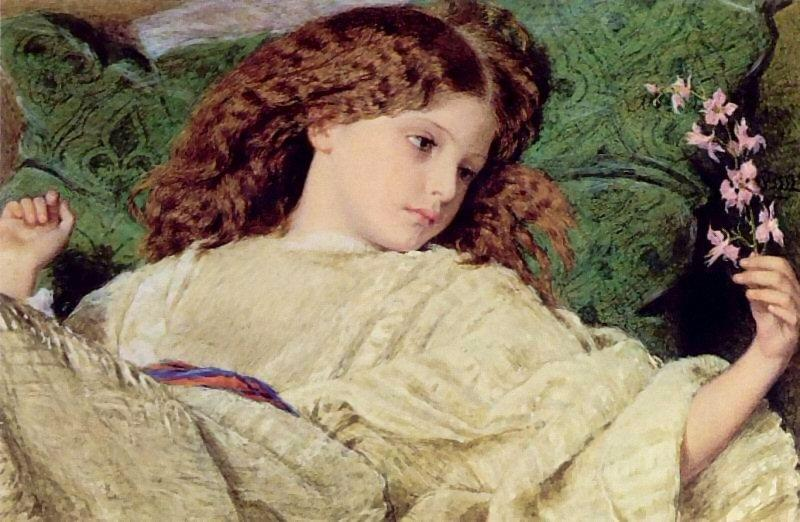
Dreams, 1863

=== Directorship of the National Gallery ===
In 1874 Burton was appointed director of the National Gallery, London, in succession to Sir William Boxall RA. In June 1874, he obtained a special grant to acquire the art collection of Alexander Barker, which included Piero della Francesca's Nativity and Botticelli's Venus and Mars. In 1876 a bequest of 94 paintings, mainly by Dutch artists but also including works by Pollaiuolo, Bouts and Canaletto, was made by the haberdasher Wynne Ellis. Also in this year an extension to the Gallery by E. M. Barry was completed.

During the twenty years that he held this post he was responsible for many important purchases, among them Leonardo da Vinci's Virgin of the Rocks, Raphael's Ansidei Madonna, Anthony van Dyck's Equestrian portrait of Charles I, Hans Holbein the Younger's Ambassadors, and the Admiral Pulido Pareja, by Diego Velázquez (this subsequently attributed to Velázquez's assistant Juan Bautista Martínez del Mazo). He also added to the noted series of Early Italian pictures in the gallery. The number of acquisitions made to the collection during his period of office amounts to more than 500.

== Exhibitions ==
In the National Gallery of Ireland an exhibition of Burton's work ran from 25 October 2017 to 14 January 2018.

== Influence ==
Irish artist Joe Caslin's mural during the 2015 marriage equality campaign in Ireland directly referenced Frederic William Burton’s The Meeting on the Turret Stairs, one of the National Gallery of Ireland’s most celebrated works.
