= Children and Family Relationships Act 2015 =

Oireachtas
- Long title: Long Title; An Act to provide for certain matters relating to donor-assisted human reproduction and the parentage of children born as a result of donor-assisted human reproduction procedures; to provide for the establishment and maintenance of a register to be known as the National Donor-Conceived Person Register; to amend and extend the law relating to the guardianship and custody of, and access to, children and for those purposes to amend the Guardianship of Infants Act 1964; to extend the category of persons who may be liable for the maintenance of children and for that purpose to amend the Family Law (Maintenance of Spouses and Children) Act 1976, and for that and other purposes to amend the Civil Partnership and Certain Rights and Obligations of Cohabitants Act 2010; to provide for the use in certain circumstances of DNA testing to determine parentage and for that and other purposes to amend the Status of Children Act 1987; to amend the Family Law Act 1995; to amend the category of persons who may adopt children and for that and other purposes to amend the Adoption Act 2010; to make consequential amendments to the Succession Act 1965, the Civil Registration Act 2004 and other enactments; and to provide for related matters.
- Citation: Children and Family Relationships Act 2015
- Enacted by: Dáil Éireann
- Enacted: 12 March 2015
- Enacted by: Seanad Éireann
- Enacted: 30 March 2015
- Signed by: President Michael D. Higgins
- Signed: 6 April 2015
- Commenced: 1 July 2015 (Part 10); 18 January 2016 (Parts 1, 4, 5, 6, 7, 8, 12 and 13); 4 May 2020 (Parts 2 and 3)

First chamber: Dáil Éireann
- Introduced by: Frances Fitzgerald

Amended by
- Acts Amended: Guardianship of Infants Act 1964; Succession Act 1965; Family Law (Maintenance of Spouses and Children) Act 1976; Status of Children Act 1987; Family Law Act 1995; Civil Registration Act 2004; Passports Act 2008; Adoption Act 2010; Civil Partnership and Certain Rights and Obligations of Cohabitants Act 2010; Redundancy Payments Act 1967; Unfair Dismissals Act 1977; Child Care Act 1991; Protection Act 1994; Adoptive Leave Act 1995; Parental Leave Act 1998; Children (Hague Convention) Act 2000; Support Act 2011
- Status: Current legislation

The Children and Family Relationships Act 2015 (Act No. 9 of 2015, bill no. 14 of 2015) amended family law in Ireland to extend parental rights and responsibilities to non-traditional families. It simplifies adoption rights for the spouse or civil partner of a biological parent, and for a long-term domestic partner. It also addresses donor-assisted reproduction (sperm donation and egg donation).

== Background ==
Official reports related to the subject of the bill include the 2005 report of the Commission on Assisted Human Reproduction, and the 2010 report of the Law Reform Commission, which included a draft "children and parental responsibility bill". The Civil Partnership and Certain Rights and Obligations of Cohabitants Act 2010 provided for same-sex civil partnerships, and for shared rights within non-marital relationships, without addressing the issue of children within those relationships. The government elected in 2011 introduced the Thirty-first Amendment of the Constitution, relating to children's rights, which was approved at referendum in 2012 but not signed into law until 28 April 2015 because of a legal challenge to the conduct of the government during the referendum.

== Legislature ==
The general scheme of the Children and Family Relationships Bill was published for consultation in January 2014 by Alan Shatter, the Minister for Justice and Equality, and discussed by the Oireachtas Joint Committee on Justice, Defence and Equality in April 2014. The bill was introduced in Dáil Éireann on 17 February 2015 by Shatter's successor as minister, Frances Fitzgerald. The government had planned to have the bill enacted before the same-sex marriage referendum in May 2015, so that the issue of adoption by same-sex couples would not be used by opponents of same-sex marriage in the referendum campaign. Fitzgerald distinguished the family bill from the amendment bill at a seminar organised by the Children's Rights Alliance. The bill was approved by the Dáil on 12 March. It passed the Seanad on 30 March, in a 20–2 vote and was signed into law by President Michael D. Higgins on 6 April 2015. All provisions of the act did not come into legal effect.

Senator Jim Walsh resigned from the Fianna Fáil parliamentary party over its support for the bill.

== Commencement ==
- 1 July 2015: The Children and Family Relationships Act 2015 (Part 10) (Commencement) Order 2015 commenced; specifying that Part 10 of the Act in its entirety commences.
- 18 January 2016: The Children and Family Relationships Act 2015 (Commencement of Certain Provisions) Order 2016 commenced; specifying provisions of Parts 1, 4, 5, 6, 7, 8, 12 and 13 of the Act.
- 4 May 2020: Children and Family Relationships Act 2015 (Parts 2 and 3) (Commencement) Order 2019 commenced; Parts 2 and 3.
- 4 May 2020: Children and Family Relationships Act 2015 (Commencement of Certain Provisions) Order 2019 commenced; Parts 4, 6, 7 and 12, insofar as it is not already in operation, and section 176.

== Amendment ==
Portions of the Act allowing for joint adoption, which never went into effect as no commencement order was signed, were repealed in 2017 after passage of the Adoption (Amendment) Act 2017, which legalised joint adoption by same-sex couples. Drafting errors in the Act were amended before they were commenced by the Children and Family Relationships (Amendment) Act 2018.

== Public opinion ==
An opinion poll published in March 2015 indicated strong public support for some of the central provisions of the Bill, namely adoption rights for same-sex and cohabiting couples. Support in both cases was measured at over 70%
