= The Meeting on the Turret Stairs =

1864 painting by Frederic William Burton

Hellelil and Hildebrand, the meeting on the turret stairs
- The Meeting on the Turret Stairs
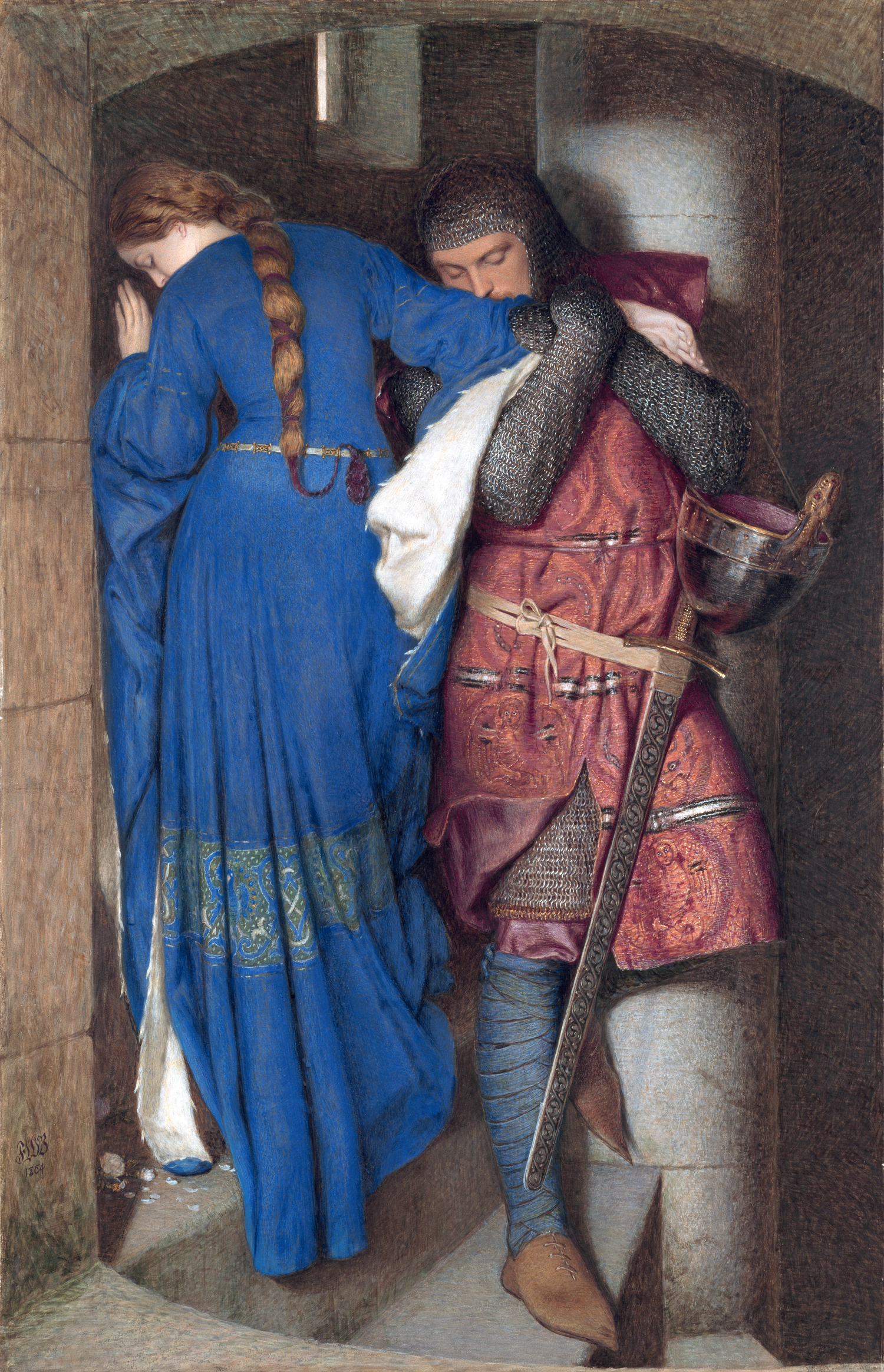
- Year: 1864
- Dimensions: 95.5 cm (37.6 in) × 60.8 cm (23.9 in)
- Accession: NGI.2358

Hellelil and Hildebrand, the Meeting on the Turret Stairs (Note: Irish: Hellelil agus Hildebrand, An Cruinniú ar Staighre an Túir) is a watercolour painting from 1864 by Frederic William Burton. It was painted in London, where Burton later became Director of the National Gallery. The painting is housed in the National Gallery of Ireland, in Dublin.

It was voted by the Irish public as Ireland's favourite painting in 2012 from among 10 works shortlisted by critics.

== Subject ==
The subject of the painting is the love story of Hellelil, who falls in love with her bodyguard Hildebrand. When her father hears of it, he sends her seven brothers to kill Hildebrand. The painting depicts the moment before Hildebrand goes out to meet the brothers, kissing Hellelil one last time, and parting with the injunction to "say never my name". Hildebrand subdues each brother until he comes to the youngest; then Hellelil, forgetting his request, calls to him to plead for mercy; as Hildebrand complies, the youngest brother kills him. Said brother takes Hellelil back to their house by dragging her from his horse, tortures her, and locks her up in a tower for many days, eventually selling her for a church bell. Hellelil tells this story to a Danish Queen in whose service she is, before falling down dead herself. The story was taken from a medieval Danish ballad translated as Hellalyle and Hildebrand by the painter's friend Whitley Stokes and published in Fraser's Magazine, 1855, Vol. 51, p. 89. The poet's sister Margaret Stokes later presented it to the museum.

She sat in her bower, with eyes of flame,
(My sorrow is known to God alone.)
Bending over the broidery frame,
(And oh there liveth none to whom my sorrow may be told.)...

The translation of the same poem by William Morris called Hildebrand And Hellelil is more famous:

Hellelil sitteth in bower there,
None knows my grief but God alone,
And seweth at the seam so fair,
I never wail my sorrow to any other one...

Original Scandinavian ballads are Stolts Hilla (Geijer & Afzelius #32) and Hilla Lilla (Ahlström No. 268).

George Eliot noted about it: ‘The subject might have been made the most vulgar thing in the world – the artist has raised it to the highest pitch of refined emotion’.

== Display ==
Burton used watercolour when painting, and so the picture is vulnerable to damage from bright or ultraviolet light. To protect it, the gallery only displays it for two one-hour sessions a week, returning it to a special cabinet when not on display. Also, when on display, direct light levels are lowered to protect the painting.
