= Gordon Linney =

Irish Anglican priest: (born 1939)

Gordon Charles Scott Linney is an Irish Anglican priest: he was Archdeacon of Dublin from 1988 to 2004.

Linney was born in 1939 and ordained in 1970. He was a curate at Agherton and then a Minor canon at Down Cathedral. Later he held incumbencies in Dublin and Glenageary. He was appointed Archdeacon of Dublin in 1988 and later served as Honorary Secretary to the Church of Ireland General Synod. He took part in the New Ireland Forum and was a member of a Government Review Body on Primary Education. He served as a member of the Commissioners for Charitable Donations and Bequests. His publications include Sing and Pray, Thinking Anew, An Easter People (Ed John Scally), With Trust in Place (Ed. Alice Leahy), Untold Stories (ed Colin Murphy) Moving Forward Together ( ed Ginnie Kennerly) A Just Society (ed John Scally), Credo (ed John Quinn), He has contributed the following articles to Search Magazine: A New Millennium (2000), Civil Partnerships (2011), Abortion Issues (2013, Immigration (2015). He also writes a regular column for the Irish Times newspaper. He married Helen Henry in 1965 and they have three children. Helen died in 2015.

In 2022, St Paul's Church in Glenageary named a room in the community hall centre the 'Linney Room' in thanks to Gordon and his families' dedication to the church and the wider community.
