= Journey to the Forbidden China =

1985 book by Steven W. Mosher

- Author: Steven W. Mosher
- Language: English
- Genre: Non-fiction
- Published: 1985
- Publisher: Collier-Macmillan Canada, Inc
- Publication place: United States of America
- Pages: 180
- ISBN: 0-02-921710-5

Journey to the Forbidden China is a book by Steven W. Mosher, an anti-communist author and activist. The book covers his anthropological work in the countryside of South China.

== Synopsis ==
Mosher traveled throughout Southern China from Guangdong (Canton) and visited several provinces to witness first hand the stark, desolate countryside isolated from the rest of the world. The countryside of Guangxi province was visited by Mosher and his guide first, where he documented the experiences of the Zhuang people in their mostly autonomous region. The author continued to write of his experiences traveling down a "Class Four Highway" (a dirt road) to Guizhou (Kweichow) province.

Guizhou is a mountainous province with a sparse population grubbing out an existence in the barren land using new world crops of maize and sweet potatoes. The province was only settled in the 16th century after the introduction of said new world crops, crops that are hardy enough to survive the soil and the short growing season. Mosher found evidence of malnutrition and recurring bouts of famine in the province remain common.

What was striking to Mosher about the rural Chinese life was that the people in such villages lacked access to schooling, healthcare, radio or television, and even were untouched by basic amenities such as fertilizer, electricity, running water, or modern agricultural tools. According to the author, the villagers were unresponsive to the Chinese Communist Revolution as well as the CCP's claims that it was fought for and by the peasants. The only contact with the central government in Beijing is through the party cadres and the CCP's version of the KGB, the Chinese Communist Party's secret police.

Mosher's travels were halted by an encounter with the Chinese Ministry of Public Security, who detained him on the basis that he never received permission from Guangzhou Municipal Public Security to operate a motor vehicle and travel to and through Chongqing, Chengdu, Nanjing, Suzhou, and Beijing in addition to Guizhou province. Accordidng to Mosher, The Guangzhou Municipal Public Security office had in fact issued him a permit to travel by motor vehicle through the aforementioned provinces and back to Guangzhou. The Public Security cadres questioned Mosher and informed him that Guizhou was off limits to foreigners due to the presence of military bases. The author believed that it was because Guizhou was the poorest province in China, and that the government did not want a cultural anthropologist reporting on the abject poverty of the province and the failures of the Chinese Communist Party. In addition, he claimed that their decision was influenced by his previous reporting on the forced abortions and sterilizations of Chinese peasant women who violated the One Child Policy. Mosher was told to write a confession, but avoided this by writing a defense in English. Mosher was then put on a train back to Guangzhou.

== Controversy ==
Mosher was a graduate anthropology student at Stanford University when he made his trips to China, which formed the basis of his books Broken Earth: The Rural Chinese and Journey to the Forbidden China. He was the first American that was allowed to freely travel throughout China via motor vehicle for extensive anthropological research. However, during the course of his research Mosher was expelled from Stanford's PhD program for "unethical conduct", a move that New York Times book critic Bryan Johnson speculated may have been due to Beijing pressuring Stanford to expel Mosher for controversial views held in Broken Earth. Stanford professor Clifford R. Barnett responded to this statement in a letter to the editor where he claimed that Mosher had been expelled prior to the publication of Broken Earth and that "the investigation of his behavior while doing his student fieldwork was initiated more than one and a half years before, on Oct. 1, 1981". Mosher unsuccessfully contested the expulsion, stating that the decision to uphold the suspension "is particularly disconcerting to me because I was exonerated on many points of fact and some of the charges against me."

== Reception ==
Critical reception for Journey to the Forbidden China was mostly positive. The New York Times praised the work as "an impressive and compelling piece of testimony." Foreign Affairs also praised the book, which they felt was "One of the most revealing books on contemporary China yet published".

In contrast, the Los Angeles Times gave a mixed review and wrote "The value of reading a book like this is the sense it gives of the huge obstacles in the way of really bettering the lot of China's billion people. On the minus side, however, the author does not seem interested at all in noting the vast progress that has been made in the five years since he left. Mosher's China of blacks and whites often seems as monochromatic as that of the communists he denounces."

== See also ==
- Broken Earth: The Rural Chinese
- China Misperceived
- Population Control: Real Costs, Illusory Benefits
- A Mother's Ordeal
