= July 22 =

July 22 this year in various calendars
- Wednesday, 22 July 2026
Other calendars
Armenian	2 Nawasardi 1476
Aztec	Quecholli 13, 12 Cipactli
Babylonian	7 Du'uzu, 2337 SE
Balinese pawukon	Luang, Pepet, Pasah, Jaya, Keliwon, Tungleh, Buda of Pahang, Guru, Urungan, Manuh
Bengali	7 Bhadro, BS 1433
Chinese	Yin Fire Rooster・Chariot Mansion -21 Qīyuè, Bǐngwǔnián (Xiaoshu, 1 day until Dashu)
Common Era	22 July 2026 CE
Coptic	15 Epip, AM 1742
Egyptian	7 Choiak, 2775 NE
Ethiopian	15 Ḥamlē, 2018 Amätä Məhrät
French Republican	Décade I, Quartidi de Thermidor de l'Année 234 de la République
Gregorian	22 July, AD 2026
Hebrew	8 Av, AM 5786
Icelandic	Miðvikudagur, 1 Aukanætur 2026
Islamic	6 Safar, AH 1448 (using tabular method)
ISO week date	2026-W30-3
Japanese	9 Minazuki, Reiwa 8 (Shōsho, 1 day until Taisho)
Julian	9 July, AD 2026 (AM 7534)
Julian day	2461244
Maya	13.0.13.14.1; 14 Xul, 12 Imix
Roman	ante diem VII Idus Iulias, MMDCCLXXIX AUC
Solar Hijri	31 Tir, SH 1405

<<	July					>>
Su	Mo	Tu	We	Th	Fr	Sa
			1	2	3	4
5	6	7	8	9	10	11
12	13	14	15	16	17	18
19	20	21	22	23	24	25
26	27	28	29	30	31
2026

July 22 in recent years
2026 (Wednesday)
2025 (Tuesday)
2024 (Monday)
2023 (Saturday)
2022 (Friday)
2021 (Thursday)
2020 (Wednesday)
2019 (Monday)
2018 (Sunday)
2017 (Saturday)

July 22 is the 203rd day of the year (204th in leap years) in the Gregorian calendar; 162 days remain until the end of the year.

== Events ==
=== Pre-1600 ===
- 259 – Election of Pope Dionysius after the death of Pope Sixtus II in the persecutions of Emperor Valerian in the previous year.
- 838 – Battle of Anzen: The Byzantine emperor Theophilos suffers a heavy defeat by the Abbasids.
- 1099 – First Crusade: Godfrey of Bouillon is elected the first Defender of the Holy Sepulchre of The Kingdom of Jerusalem.
- 1209 – Massacre at Béziers: The first major military action of the Albigensian Crusade.
- 1227 – A coalition of north-east German towns, counts and princes defeats King Valdemar II of Denmark in the Battle of Bornhöved.
- 1298 – Wars of Scottish Independence: Battle of Falkirk: King Edward I of England and his longbowmen defeat William Wallace and his Scottish schiltrons outside the town of Falkirk.
- 1342 – St. Mary Magdalene's flood is the worst such event on record for central Europe.
- 1443 – Battle of St. Jakob an der Sihl in the Old Zürich War.
- 1456 – Ottoman wars in Europe: Siege of Belgrade: John Hunyadi, Regent of the Kingdom of Hungary, defeats Mehmet II of the Ottoman Empire.
- 1484 – Battle of Lochmaben Fair: A 500-man raiding party led by Alexander Stewart, Duke of Albany and James Douglas, 9th Earl of Douglas are defeated by Scots forces loyal to Albany's brother James III of Scotland; Douglas is captured.
- 1499 – Battle of Dornach: The Swiss decisively defeat the army of Maximilian I, Holy Roman Emperor.
- 1587 – Roanoke Colony: A second group of English settlers arrives on Roanoke Island off North Carolina to re-establish the deserted colony.
- 1594 – The Dutch city of Groningen defended by the Spanish and besieged by a Dutch and English army under Maurice of Orange, capitulates.
- 1598 – William Shakespeare's play, The Merchant of Venice, is entered on the Stationers' Register. By decree of Queen Elizabeth, the Stationers' Register licensed printed works, giving the Crown tight control over all published material.

=== 1601–1900 ===
- 1686 – Albany, New York is formally chartered as a municipality by Governor Thomas Dongan.
- 1706 – The Acts of Union 1707 are agreed upon by commissioners from the Kingdom of England and the Kingdom of Scotland, which, when passed by each country's Parliament, leads to the creation of the Kingdom of Great Britain.
- 1793 – Alexander Mackenzie reaches the Pacific Ocean becoming the first recorded human to complete a transcontinental crossing of North America.
- 1796 – Surveyors of the Connecticut Land Company name an area in Ohio "Cleveland" after Gen. Moses Cleaveland, the superintendent of the surveying party.
- 1797 – Battle of Santa Cruz de Tenerife: Battle between Spanish and British naval forces during the French Revolutionary Wars. During the Battle, Rear-Admiral Nelson is wounded in the arm and the arm had to be partially amputated.
- 1802 – Emperor Gia Long conquers Hanoi and unified Viet Nam, which had experienced centuries of feudal warfare.
- 1805 – Napoleonic Wars: War of the Third Coalition: Battle of Cape Finisterre: An inconclusive naval action is fought between a combined French and Spanish fleet under Admiral Pierre-Charles Villeneuve of France and a British fleet under Admiral Robert Calder.
- 1812 – Napoleonic Wars: Peninsular War: Battle of Salamanca: British forces led by Arthur Wellesley (later the Duke of Wellington) defeat French troops near Salamanca, Spain.
- 1833 – The Slavery Abolition Act passes in the British House of Commons, initiating the gradual abolition of slavery in most parts of the British Empire.
- 1864 – American Civil War: In the Battle of Atlanta, Confederate General John Bell Hood leads an unsuccessful attack on Union troops under General William T. Sherman on Bald Hill outside Atlanta.
- 1880 – Abdur Rahman is proclaimed emir of Afghanistan after having been accepted as ruler by the British.
- 1893 – Katharine Lee Bates writes "America the Beautiful" after admiring the view from the top of Pikes Peak near Colorado Springs, Colorado.
- 1894 – The first ever motor race is held in France between the cities of Paris and Rouen. The fastest finisher was the Comte Jules-Albert de Dion, but the "official" victory was awarded to Albert Lemaître driving his three-horsepower petrol engined Peugeot.

=== 1901–present ===
- 1916 – Preparedness Day Bombing: In San Francisco, a bomb explodes on Market Street during a parade, killing ten and injuring 40.
- 1921 – Rif War: The Spanish Army suffers its worst military defeat in modern times to the Berbers of the Rif region of Spanish Morocco.
- 1933 – Aviator Wiley Post returns to Floyd Bennett Field in New York City, completing the first solo flight around the world in seven days, 18 hours and 49 minutes.
- 1936 – Spanish Civil War: The Popular Executive Committee of Valencia takes power in the Valencian Community.
- 1937 – New Deal: The United States Senate votes down President Franklin D. Roosevelt's proposal to add more justices to the Supreme Court of the United States.
- 1942 – The United States government begins compulsory civilian gasoline rationing due to the wartime demands.
- 1942 – Grossaktion Warsaw: The systematic deportation of Jews from the Warsaw ghetto begins.
- 1943 – World War II: Allied forces capture Palermo during the Allied invasion of Sicily.
- 1943 – World War II: Axis occupation forces violently disperse a massive protest in Athens, killing 22.
- 1944 – The Polish Committee of National Liberation publishes its manifesto, starting the period of Communist rule in Poland.
- 1946 – King David Hotel bombing: A Zionist underground organisation, the Irgun, bombs the King David Hotel in Jerusalem, site of the civil administration and military headquarters for Mandatory Palestine, resulting in 91 deaths.
- 1951 – Soviet space dogs: Dezik and Tsygan were launched into a sub-orbital spaceflight from Kapustin Yar and became the first dogs to fly in space and the first to safely return.
- 1962 – Mariner program: Mariner 1 spacecraft flies erratically several minutes after launch and has to be destroyed.
- 1963 – Crown Colony of Sarawak gains self-governance.
- 1973 – Pan Am Flight 816 crashes after takeoff from Faa'a International Airport in Papeete, French Polynesia, killing 78.
- 1976 – Japan completes its last reparation to the Philippines for war crimes committed during imperial Japan's conquest of the country in the Second World War.
- 1977 – Chinese leader Deng Xiaoping is restored to power.
- 1981 – The first game of the 1981 South Africa rugby union tour of New Zealand and the United States is held in Gisborne, New Zealand.
- 1983 – Martial law in Poland is officially revoked.
- 1990 – Greg LeMond, an American road racing cyclist, wins his third Tour de France after leading the majority of the race. It was LeMond's second consecutive Tour de France victory.
- 1992 – Near Medellín, Colombian drug lord Pablo Escobar escapes from his luxury prison fearing extradition to the United States.
- 1993 – Great Flood of 1993: Levees near Kaskaskia, Illinois rupture, forcing the entire town to evacuate by barges operated by the Army Corps of Engineers.
- 1997 – The second Blue Water Bridge opens between Port Huron, Michigan and Sarnia, Ontario.
- 2003 – Iraq War: Members of 101st Airborne of the United States, aided by Special Forces, attack a compound in Iraq, killing Saddam Hussein's sons Uday and Qusay, along with Mustapha Hussein, Qusay's 14-year-old son, and a bodyguard.
- 2005 – Jean Charles de Menezes is killed by police as the hunt begins for the London Bombers responsible for the 7 July 2005 London bombings and the 21 July 2005 London bombings.
- 2011 – Norway attacks: A bomb explodes, targeted at government buildings in central Oslo, followed by a massacre at a youth camp on the island of Utøya.
- 2012 – Syrian civil war: The People's Protection Units (YPG) captured the cities of Serê Kaniyê and Dirbêsiyê, during clashes with pro-government forces in Al-Hasakah.
- 2013 – Dingxi earthquakes: A series of earthquakes in Dingxi, China, kills at least 89 people and injures more than 500 others.
- 2019 – Chandrayaan-2, the second lunar exploration mission developed by Indian Space Research Organisation after Chandrayaan-1 is launched from Satish Dhawan Space Centre in a GSLV Mark III M1. It consists of a lunar orbiter, and also included the Vikram lander, and the Pragyan lunar rover.

== Births ==
=== Pre-1600 ===
- 1210 – Joan of England, Queen of Scotland (died 1238)
- 1437 – John Scrope, 5th Baron Scrope of Bolton, English Baron (died 1498)
- 1476 – Zhu Youyuan, Ming Dynasty politician (died 1519)
- 1478 – Philip I of Castile (died 1506)
- 1531 – Leonhard Thurneysser, scholar at the court of the Elector of Brandenburg (died 1595)
- 1535 – Katarina Stenbock, queen of Gustav I of Sweden (died 1621)
- 1552 – Anthony Browne, Sheriff of Surrey and Kent (died 1592)
- 1552 – Mary Wriothesley, Countess of Southampton, Lady of English peer and others (died 1607)
- 1559 – Lawrence of Brindisi, Italian priest and saint (died 1619)

=== 1601–1900 ===
- 1615 – Marguerite of Lorraine, princess of Lorraine, duchess of Orléans (died 1672)
- 1618 – Johan Nieuhof, Dutch traveler (died 1672)
- 1621 – Anthony Ashley Cooper, 1st Earl of Shaftesbury, English politician, Lord Chancellor of the United Kingdom (died 1683)
- 1630 – Madame de Brinvilliers, French aristocrat (died 1676)
- 1647 – Margaret Mary Alacoque, French nun, mystic and saint (died 1690)
- 1651 – Ferdinand Tobias Richter, Austrian organist and composer (died 1711)
- 1711 – Georg Wilhelm Richmann, German-Russian physicist and academic (died 1753)
- 1713 – Jacques-Germain Soufflot, French architect, designed the Panthéon (died 1780)
- 1733 – Mikhail Shcherbatov, Russian philosopher and historian (died 1790)
- 1755 – Gaspard de Prony, French mathematician and engineer (died 1839)
- 1784 – Friedrich Bessel, German mathematician and astronomer (died 1846)
- 1820 – Oliver Mowat, Canadian politician, 3rd Premier of Ontario, 8th Lieutenant Governor of Ontario (died 1903)
- 1839 – Jakob Hurt, Estonian theologist and linguist (died 1907)
- 1844 – William Archibald Spooner, English priest and scholar (died 1930)
- 1848 – Adolphus Frederick V, Grand Duke of Mecklenburg-Strelitz (died 1914)
- 1849 – Emma Lazarus, American poet and educator (died 1887)
- 1856 – Octave Hamelin, French philosopher (died 1907)
- 1857 – Jack Glasscock, American baseball player (died 1947)
- 1862 – Cosmo Duff-Gordon, Scottish fencer (died 1931)
- 1863 – Alec Hearne, English cricketer (died 1952)
- 1878 – Janusz Korczak, Polish pediatrician and author (died 1942)
- 1881 – Augusta Fox Bronner, American psychologist, specialist in juvenile psychology (died 1966)
- 1882 – Edward Hopper, American painter and etcher (died 1967)
- 1884 – Odell Shepard, American poet and politician, 66th Lieutenant Governor of Connecticut (died 1967)
- 1886 – Hella Wuolijoki, Estonian-Finnish author (died 1954)
- 1887 – Gustav Ludwig Hertz, German physicist and academic, Nobel Prize laureate (died 1975)
- 1888 – Kirk Bryan, American geologist and academic (died 1950)
- 1888 – Selman Waksman, Jewish-American biochemist and microbiologist, Nobel Prize laureate (died 1973)
- 1889 – James Whale, English director (died 1957)
- 1890 – Rose Kennedy, American philanthropist and Kennedy family matriarch (died 1995)
- 1892 – Jack MacBryan, English cricketer and field hockey player (died 1983)
- 1893 – Jesse Haines, American baseball player and coach (died 1978)
- 1893 – Karl Menninger, American psychiatrist and author (died 1990)
- 1895 – León de Greiff, Colombian poet, journalist, and diplomat (died 1976)
- 1898 – Stephen Vincent Benét, American poet, short story writer, and novelist (died 1943)
- 1898 – Alexander Calder, American sculptor, known for his kinetic sculptures (died 1976)
- 1899 – Sobhuza II of Swaziland (died 1982)

=== 1901–present ===
- 1905 – Doc Cramer, American baseball player (died 1990)
- 1908 – Amy Vanderbilt, American author (died 1974)
- 1908 – Terris McDuffie, American baseball player (died 1968)
- 1909 – Licia Albanese, Italian-American soprano and actress (died 2014)
- 1909 – Dorino Serafini, Italian racing driver (died 2000)
- 1910 – Ruthie Tompson, American animator and artist (died 2021)
- 1913 – Gorni Kramer, Italian bassist, songwriter, and bandleader (died 1995)
- 1915 – Shaista Suhrawardy Ikramullah, Indian-Pakistani politician and diplomat (died 2000)
- 1916 – Gino Bianco, Brazilian racing driver (died 1984)
- 1916 – Marcel Cerdan, French boxer (died 1949)
- 1921 – William Roth, American lawyer and politician (died 2003)
- 1922 – Dan Rowan, American comedian (Rowan & Martin's Laugh-In) (died 1987)
- 1923 – Bob Dole, American soldier, lawyer, and politician (died 2021)
- 1923 – César Fernández Ardavín, Spanish director, producer, and screenwriter (died 2012)
- 1923 – The Fabulous Moolah, American wrestler (died 2007)
- 1924 – Margaret Whiting, American singer (died 2011)
- 1925 – Jack Matthews, American author, playwright, and academic (died 2013)
- 1925 – Joseph Sargent, American actor, director, and producer (died 2014)
- 1926 – Bryan Forbes, English actor, director, producer, and screenwriter (died 2013)
- 1926 – Wolfgang Iser, German scholar, literary theorist (died 2007)
- 1927 – Johan Ferner, Norwegian sailor (died 2015)
- 1928 – Orson Bean, American actor (died 2020)
- 1928 – Jimmy Hill, English footballer, manager, and sportscaster (died 2015)
- 1928 – Per Højholt, Danish poet (died 2004)
- 1929 – John Barber, English racing driver (died 2015)
- 1929 – Leonid Stolovich, Russian-Estonian philosopher and academic (died 2013)
- 1929 – Neil Welliver, American painter (died 2005)
- 1929 – Baselios Thomas I, Indian bishop (died 2024)
- 1931 – Leo Labine, Canadian ice hockey player (died 2005)
- 1932 – Oscar de la Renta, Dominican-American fashion designer (died 2014)
- 1932 – Tom Robbins, American novelist (died 2025)
- 1934 – Junior Cook, American saxophonist (died 1992)
- 1934 – Louise Fletcher, American actress (died 2022)
- 1934 – Leon Rotman, Romanian canoeist
- 1935 – Tom Cartwright, English-Welsh cricketer and coach (died 2007)
- 1936 – Don Patterson, American organist (died 1988)
- 1936 – Harold Rhodes, English cricketer
- 1936 – Geraldine Claudette Darden, American mathematician
- 1937 – Chuck Jackson, American R&B singer and songwriter (died 2023)
- 1937 – Yasuhiro Kojima, Japanese-American wrestler and manager (died 1999)
- 1937 – John Price, English cricketer
- 1937 – Vasant Ranjane, Indian cricketer (died 2011)
- 1938 – Terence Stamp, English actor (died 2025)
- 1940 – Judith Walzer Leavitt, American historian and academic
- 1940 – Alex Trebek, Canadian-American game show host and producer (died 2020)
- 1941 – Estelle Bennett, American singer (died 2009)
- 1941 – Vaughn Bodē, American illustrator (died 1975)
- 1941 – George Clinton, American singer-songwriter and producer
- 1941 – David M. Kennedy, American historian and author
- 1942 – Michael Abney-Hastings, 14th Earl of Loudoun, English-Australian politician (died 2012)
- 1942 – Peter Habeler, Austrian mountaineer and skier
- 1942 – Les Johns, Australian rugby league player and coach
- 1943 – Masaru Emoto, Japanese author and activist (died 2014)
- 1943 – Kay Bailey Hutchison, American lawyer and politician
- 1943 – Bobby Sherman, American singer-songwriter and actor (died 2025)
- 1944 – Rick Davies, English singer-songwriter and keyboard player (died 2025)
- 1944 – Peter Jason, American actor (died 2025)
- 1944 – Sparky Lyle, American baseball player and manager
- 1944 – Anand Satyanand, New Zealand lawyer, judge, and politician, 19th Governor-General of New Zealand
- 1945 – Philip Cohen, English biochemist and academic
- 1946 – Jim Edgar, American politician, 38th Governor of Illinois (died 2025)
- 1946 – Danny Glover, American actor, director, and producer
- 1946 – Paul Schrader, American director and screenwriter
- 1946 – Rolando Joven Tria Tirona, Filipino archbishop
- 1946 – Johnson Toribiong, Palauan lawyer and politician, 7th President of Palau
- 1947 – Albert Brooks, American actor, comedian, director, and screenwriter
- 1947 – Gilles Duceppe, Canadian politician
- 1947 – Don Henley, American singer-songwriter and drummer
- 1948 – Neil Hardwick, British–Finnish theatre and television director
- 1948 – S. E. Hinton, American author
- 1949 – Alan Menken, American pianist and composer
- 1949 – Ann Godoff, American book editor, publisher and founder of Penguin Press
- 1949 – Lasse Virén, Finnish runner and police officer
- 1951 – Richard Bennett, American guitarist and producer
- 1951 – J. V. Cain, American football player (died 1979)
- 1951 – Patriarch Daniel of Romania
- 1951 – Tisa Farrow, American actress and model (died 2024)
- 1951 – Slick Watts, American basketball player (died 2025)
- 1953 – Brian Howe, English singer-songwriter (died 2020)
- 1954 – Al Di Meola, American guitarist, songwriter, and producer
- 1954 – Steve LaTourette, American lawyer and politician (died 2016)
- 1954 – Lonette McKee, American actress and singer
- 1955 – Richard J. Corman, American businessman, founded the R.J. Corman Railroad Group (died 2013)
- 1955 – Willem Dafoe, American actor
- 1956 – Mick Pointer, English neo-progressive rock drummer
- 1956 – Scott Sanderson, American baseball player and sportscaster (died 2019)
- 1957 – Dave Stieb, American baseball player
- 1958 – Tatsunori Hara, Japanese baseball player and coach
- 1958 – David Von Erich, American wrestler (died 1984)
- 1960 – Jon Oliva, American singer-songwriter and keyboard player
- 1960 – John Leguizamo, Colombian-American actor, producer, and screenwriter
- 1961 – Calvin Fish, English racing driver and sportscaster
- 1961 – Keith Sweat, American singer-songwriter and producer
- 1962 – Steve Albini, American record producer and musician (died 2024)
- 1962 – Alvin Robertson, American basketball player
- 1962 – Martine St. Clair, Canadian singer and actress
- 1963 – Emilio Butragueño, Spanish footballer
- 1963 – Emily Saliers, American singer-songwriter and musician
- 1964 – Will Calhoun, American drummer
- 1964 – Bonnie Langford, English actress and dancer
- 1964 – David Spade, American actor, producer, and screenwriter
- 1965 – Derrick Dalley, Canadian educator and politician
- 1965 – Shawn Michaels, American wrestler, trainer, and actor
- 1965 – Richard B. Poore, New Zealand humanitarian
- 1965 – Doug Riesenberg, American football player and coach
- 1966 – Tim Brown, American football player and manager
- 1967 – Lauren Booth, English journalist and activist
- 1967 – Rhys Ifans, Welsh actor
- 1969 – Rebecca Kiessling, American attorney and anti-abortion activist
- 1969 – Despina Vandi, German-Greek singer and actress
- 1970 – Jason Becker, American guitarist and songwriter
- 1970 – Steve Carter, Australian rugby league player
- 1970 – Sergei Zubov, Russian ice hockey player and coach
- 1972 – Franco Battaini, Italian motorcycle racer
- 1972 – Colin Ferguson, Canadian actor, director, and producer
- 1972 – Seth Fisher, American illustrator (died 2006)
- 1972 – Keyshawn Johnson, American football player and sportscaster
- 1973 – Brian Chippendale, American singer and drummer
- 1973 – Mike Sweeney, American baseball player and sportscaster
- 1973 – Daniel Jones, Australian musician and songwriter
- 1973 – Ece Temelkuran, Turkish journalist and author
- 1973 – Rufus Wainwright, American-Canadian singer-songwriter
- 1973 – Jaime Camil, Mexican actor and singer
- 1974 – Franka Potente, German actress
- 1977 – Ezio Galon, Italian rugby player
- 1977 – Ingo Hertzsch, German footballer
- 1977 – Gustavo Nery, Brazilian footballer
- 1978 – Runako Morton, Nevisian cricketer (died 2012)
- 1978 – Dennis Rommedahl, Danish footballer
- 1978 – A.J. Cook, Canadian actress
- 1979 – Lucas Luhr, German racing driver
- 1979 – Yadel Martí, Cuban baseball player
- 1980 – Dirk Kuyt, Dutch footballer
- 1980 – Scott Dixon, New Zealand racing driver
- 1980 – Kate Ryan, Belgian singer-songwriter
- 1980 – Tablo, South Korean-Canadian rapper
- 1982 – Nuwan Kulasekara, Sri Lankan cricketer
- 1983 – Aldo de Nigris, Mexican footballer
- 1983 – Dries Devenyns, Belgian cyclist
- 1983 – Steven Jackson, American football player
- 1983 – Andreas Ulvo, Norwegian pianist
- 1984 – Stewart Downing, English footballer
- 1985 – Jessica Abbott, Australian swimmer
- 1985 – Takudzwa Ngwenya, Zimbabwean-American rugby player
- 1985 – Akira Tozawa, Japanese wrestler
- 1986 – Colin de Grandhomme, Zimbabwean-New Zealand cricketer
- 1986 – Stevie Johnson, American football player
- 1987 – Denis Gargaud Chanut, French slalom canoeist
- 1987 – Charlotte Kalla, Swedish skier
- 1988 – William Buick, Norwegian-British flat jockey
- 1988 – Paul Coutts, Scottish footballer
- 1988 – George Santos, American politician
- 1988 – Thomas Kraft, German footballer
- 1988 – Sercan Temizyürek, Turkish footballer
- 1989 – Israel Adesanya, New Zealand mixed martial artist and kickboxer
- 1989 – Keegan Allen, American actor, photographer and musician
- 1991 – Taylor Lewan, American football player
- 1991 – Matty James, English footballer
- 1991 – Tomi Juric, Australian footballer
- 1992 – Anja Aguilar, Filipino actress and singer
- 1992 – Selena Gomez, American singer and actress
- 1992 – Carolin Schnarre, German Paralympic equestrian
- 1993 – Dzhokhar Tsarnaev, Kyrgyzstani-American terrorist
- 1995 – Ezekiel Elliott, American football player
- 1995 – Armaan Malik, Indian playback singer, composer and songwriter
- 1995 – Jonathan Owens, American football player
- 1996 – Kevin Fiala, Swiss ice hockey player
- 1996 – Skyler Gisondo, American actor
- 1998 – Marc Cucurella, Spanish footballer
- 1998 – Larray, American YouTuber
- 1998 – Madison Pettis, American actress
- 1998 – Federico Valverde, Uruguayan footballer
- 1998 – Sahaphap Wongratch, Thai actor, model, and singer
- 1999 – Sidney Chu, Hong Kong skater
- 1999 – Jason Robertson, American ice hockey player
- 2000 – Garrett Wilson, American football player
- 2002 – Konstanse Marie Alvær, Norwegian politician
- 2002 – Prince Felix of Denmark
- 2003 – Solveig Vik, Norwegian politician
- 2006 – Javon Walton, American actor and boxer
- 2013 – Prince George of Wales

== Deaths ==
=== Pre-1600 ===
- 698 – Wu Chengsi, nephew of Chinese sovereign Wu Zetian
- 1258 – Meinhard I, Count of Gorizia-Tyrol (born c. 1200)
- 1274 – Henry I of Navarre, Count of Champagne and Brie and King of Navarre
- 1298 – Sir John de Graham, Scottish soldier at the Battle of Falkirk
- 1362 – Louis, Count of Gravina (born 1324)
- 1376 – Simon Langham, Archbishop of Canterbury (born 1310)
- 1387 – Frans Ackerman, Flemish politician (born 1330)
- 1461 – Charles VII of France (born 1403)
- 1525 – Richard Wingfield, English courtier and diplomat, Chancellor of the Duchy of Lancaster (born 1426)
- 1540 – John Zápolya, Hungarian king (born 1487)
- 1550 – Jorge de Lencastre, Duke of Coimbra (born 1481)
- 1581 – Richard Cox, English bishop (born 1500)

=== 1601–1900 ===
- 1619 – Lawrence of Brindisi, Italian priest and saint (born 1559)
- 1645 – Gaspar de Guzmán, Count-Duke of Olivares, Spanish statesman (born 1587)
- 1676 – Pope Clement X (born 1590)
- 1726 – Hugh Drysdale, English-American politician, Colonial Governor of Virginia
- 1734 – Peter King, 1st Baron King, English lawyer and politician, Lord Chancellor of England (born 1669)
- 1789 – Joseph Foullon de Doué, French politician, Controller-General of Finances (born 1715)
- 1802 – Marie François Xavier Bichat, French anatomist and physiologist (born 1771)
- 1824 – Thomas Macnamara Russell, English admiral
- 1826 – Giuseppe Piazzi, Italian mathematician and astronomer (born 1746)
- 1832 – Napoleon II, French emperor (born 1811)
- 1833 – Joseph Forlenze, Italian ophthalmologist and surgeon (born 1757)
- 1864 – James B. McPherson, American general (born 1828)
- 1869 – John A. Roebling, German-American engineer, designed the Brooklyn Bridge (born 1806)

=== 1901–present ===
- 1902 – Mieczysław Halka-Ledóchowski, Polish cardinal (born 1822)
- 1903 – Cassius Marcellus Clay, American publisher, lawyer, and politician, United States Ambassador to Russia (born 1810)
- 1904 – Wilson Barrett, English actor and playwright (born 1846)
- 1906 – William Snodgrass, Canadian minister and academic (born 1827)
- 1908 – Randal Cremer, English politician, Nobel Prize laureate (born 1828)
- 1915 – Sandford Fleming, Scottish-Canadian engineer and inventor, developed Standard time (born 1827)
- 1916 – James Whitcomb Riley, American poet and author (born 1849)
- 1918 – Indra Lal Roy, Indian lieutenant and first Indian fighter aircraft pilot (born 1898)
- 1920 – William Kissam Vanderbilt, American businessman and horse breeder (born 1849)
- 1922 – Jōkichi Takamine, Japanese-American chemist and academic (born 1854)
- 1932 – J. Meade Falkner, English author and poet (born 1858)
- 1932 – Reginald Fessenden, Canadian inventor and academic (born 1866)
- 1932 – Errico Malatesta, Italian activist and author (born 1853)
- 1932 – Flo Ziegfeld, American actor and producer (born 1867)
- 1934 – John Dillinger, American gangster (born 1903)
- 1937 – Ted McDonald, Australian cricketer and footballer (born 1891)
- 1940 – George Fuller, Australian politician, 22nd Premier of New South Wales (born 1861)
- 1940 – Albert Young, American boxer and promoter (born 1877)
- 1948 – Rūdolfs Jurciņš, Latvian basketball player (born 1909)
- 1950 – William Lyon Mackenzie King, Canadian economist and politician, 10th Prime Minister of Canada (born 1874)
- 1958 – Mikhail Zoshchenko, Ukrainian-Russian soldier and author (born 1895)
- 1967 – Carl Sandburg, American poet and historian (born 1878)
- 1968 – Giovannino Guareschi, Italian journalist and cartoonist (born 1908)
- 1970 – George Johnston, Australian journalist and author (born 1912)
- 1974 – Wayne Morse, American lawyer and politician (born 1900)
- 1979 – J. V. Cain, American football player (born 1951)
- 1979 – Sándor Kocsis, Hungarian footballer and manager (born 1929)
- 1986 – Floyd Gottfredson, American author and illustrator (born 1905)
- 1986 – Ede Staal, Dutch singer-songwriter (born 1941)
- 1987 – Fahrettin Kerim Gökay, Turkish physician and politician, Turkish Minister of Health (born 1900)
- 1990 – Manuel Puig, Argentinian author, playwright, and screenwriter (born 1932)
- 1990 – Eduard Streltsov, Soviet footballer (born 1937)
- 1992 – David Wojnarowicz, American painter, photographer, and activist (born 1954)
- 1995 – Harold Larwood, English-Australian cricketer (born 1904)
- 1996 – Rob Collins, English keyboard player (born 1956)
- 1998 – Fritz Buchloh, German footballer and coach (born 1909)
- 2000 – Eric Christmas, English-born Canadian actor (born 1916)
- 2000 – Carmen Martín Gaite, Spanish author, poet, and playwright (born 1925)
- 2000 – Raymond Lemieux, Canadian chemist and academic (born 1920)
- 2000 – Claude Sautet, French director and screenwriter (born 1924)
- 2001 – Indro Montanelli, Italian journalist and historian (born 1909)
- 2004 – Sacha Distel, French singer and guitarist (born 1933)
- 2004 – Illinois Jacquet, American saxophonist and composer (born 1922)
- 2005 – Eugene Record, American singer-songwriter and producer (born 1940)
- 2006 – Dika Newlin, American composer, singer-songwriter, and pianist (born 1923)
- 2006 – José Antonio Delgado, Venezuelan mountaineer (born 1965)
- 2007 – Mike Coolbaugh, American baseball player and coach (born 1972)
- 2007 – László Kovács, Hungarian-American director and cinematographer (born 1933)
- 2007 – Rollie Stiles, American baseball player (born 1906)
- 2008 – Estelle Getty, American actress (born 1923)
- 2009 – Richard M. Givan, American lawyer and judge (born 1921)
- 2009 – Peter Krieg, German director, producer, and screenwriter (born 1947)
- 2010 – Kenny Guinn, American banker and politician, 27th Governor of Nevada (born 1936)
- 2011 – Linda Christian, Mexican-American actress (born 1923)
- 2011 – Cees de Wolf, Dutch footballer (born 1945)
- 2012 – Ding Guangen, Chinese engineer and politician (born 1929)
- 2012 – George Armitage Miller, American psychologist and academic (born 1920)
- 2012 – Frank Pierson, American director and screenwriter (born 1925)
- 2013 – Natalie de Blois, American architect, co-designed the Lever House (born 1921)
- 2013 – Dennis Farina, American policeman and actor (born 1944)
- 2013 – Lawrie Reilly, Scottish footballer (born 1928)
- 2013 – Rosalie E. Wahl, American lawyer and judge (born 1924)
- 2014 – Johann Breyer, German SS officer (born 1925)
- 2014 – Louis Lentin, Irish director and producer (born 1933)
- 2014 – Nitzan Shirazi, Israeli footballer and manager (born 1971)
- 2018 – Frank Havens, American canoeist (born 1924)
- 2022 – Maria Petri, English association football supporter (born 1939)
- 2024 – Mark Carnevale, American golfer and radio commentator (born 1960)
- 2024 – Duke Fakir, American singer (born 1935)
- 2024 – John Mayall, English singer-songwriter, guitarist, and producer (born 1933)
- 2025 – John Fallon, Scottish footballer (born 1940)
- 2025 – George Kooymans, Dutch musician (born 1948)
- 2025 – Ozzy Osbourne, English musician and media personality (born 1948)
- 2025 – Chuck Mangione, American musician (born 1940)
- 2025 – Shelly Zegart, American quilt collector, historian, and advocate (born 1941)
- 2026 – Chuck Russell, American film director and producer (born 1958)

== Holidays and observances ==
- Christian feast day:
  - Abd-al-Masih
  - Anna Wang
  - Mary Magdalene
  - Markella
  - Nohra (Maronite Church)
  - Philip Evans and John Lloyd
  - July 22 (Eastern Orthodox liturgics)
- Sarawak Independence Day (Sarawak, Malaysia)
