= Family Life =

Family Life may also refer to:

== Books and publications ==
- Family Life (novel), a 2014 novel by Akhil Sharma
- Family Life (Amish magazine), a Canadian magazine published primarily for the Old Order Amish
- Family Life (Wenner Media magazine), an American parenting magazine (1993–2001)
- Family Life, a magazine supplement of the Belfast Telegraph, Northern Ireland

== Film and TV ==
- Family Life (1971 British film), directed by Ken Loach
- Family Life (1971 Polish film), directed by Krzysztof Zanussi
- Family Life (1985 film), a French film
- Family Life (2017 film), a Chilean film

== Organisations ==
- Family life education
- FamilyLife, a division of Cru
- Family Life Network, a Christian radio network
- Family Life Radio, a Christian radio network
- Family & Life, an Irish anti-abortion campaign group
