= Population Control: Real Costs, Illusory Benefits =

2008 nonfiction book by Steven W. Mosher

- Author: Steven W. Mosher
- Cover artist: Jaime Saranczak
- Language: English
- Subject: Non-fiction; Science
- Publisher: Transaction Publishers (US)
- Publication date: 2008
- Pages: 296 pp
- ISBN: 978-1-4128-0712-8
- LC Class: HQ766.M59 2008

Population Control: Real Costs, Illusory Benefits is a nonfiction book by Steven W. Mosher, president of the Population Research Institute, first published in 2008. Population Control is a detailed exposition on the global effort to combat overpopulation, arguing that not only population control is immoral in many cases, but that overpopulation is a myth.

Mosher was first exposed to population control policies when he visited China as an undergraduate sociologist in 1979 to conduct anthropological research. While there, he documented the implementation of China's one child policy with forced abortions firsthand.

Mosher opposes the standard Malthusian idea that overpopulation is a threat to human prosperity and future.

== See also ==
- A Mother's Ordeal
- Human population control
