= Turgut Doğan Şahin =

Turkish footballer

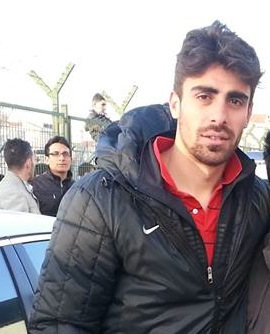

Personal information
- Full name: Turgut Doğan Şahin
- Date of birth: 2 February 1988 (age 38)
- Place of birth: Tarsus, Mersin, Turkey
- Height: 1.80 m (5 ft 11 in)
- Position: Winger

Youth career
- 1999: Yeni Ufukspor
- 1999–2004: Özmuratspor
- 2004–2006: Samsunspor

Senior career*
Years	Team	Apps	(Gls)
2006–2010	Samsunspor	78	(25)
2010–2012	MKE Ankaragücü	40	(4)
2012–2014	Gaziantepspor	50	(6)
2014	Trabzonspor	0	(0)
2014–2016	Kayserispor	27	(5)
2016	Gençlerbirliği	3	(0)
2016–2017	Kasımpaşa	25	(3)
2017–2018	Yeni Malatyaspor	9	(0)
2018	Çaykur Rizespor	8	(0)
2018–2020	Fatih Karagümrük	38	(6)
2020	Altay	13	(0)
2020	Ümraniyespor	10	(0)
2021	Şanlıurfaspor	15	(1)
2021–2022	Kuşadasıspor	8	(0)

International career
2008–2010	Turkey U21	2	(0)
2011–2012	Turkey A2	5	(0)
- * Club domestic league appearances and goals as of 7 May 2022

Turgut Doğan Şahin (born 2 February 1988) is a Turkish professional footballer.

== Life and career ==
Şahin was born in Tarsus, Mersin. He began his footballing career as an 11-year-old with Yeşilova Yeni Ufukspor. He was transferred to Sefaköy Özmuratspor in 1999, and earned a transfer to Samsunspor in 2004. After spending a season playing for the A2 team, where he scored 11 goals in 26 matches, Şahin was signed to a five-year professional contract. He made his debut as a substitute on 9 December 2006, coming on for Mustafa Çiçek in a match against Gaziantep Büyükşehir Belediyespor. Şahin played a total of two matches that season. He did not receive many chances at the beginning of the 2007–08 season, but slowly found a place in Orhan Kapucu's team. On 17 February 2008, he scored a goal in the final minutes against Orduspor to help save Samsunspor from defeat. It was his first professional league goal. At the beginning of the 2008–09 season, Şahin was a starter in the Samsunspor side. However, he was unable to score a goal in the first seven matches of the season. Several weeks later, in a match against Gaziantep Büyükşehir Belediyespor, Şahin was involved in a fist fight with Gaziantep B.B. player Hakan Albayrak. Both players received a red card as a result. Four days later, Şahin was given a three match ban by the PFDK for his actions. In his first match back from his ban, Şahin netted a goal against Kartalspor. Şahin received another red card in the 33rd round of the league against Sakaryaspor, resulting in another three match ban for unsportsmanlike conduct. He finished the season with eight goals in 29 matches.

Trabzonspor, as well as Ankaraspor, Antalyaspor, Gaziantepspor and Kayserispor showed interest in Şahin and his teammate Sercan Temizyürek before the start of the 2009–10 season, causing the forward to become unsettled. He netted his first goal of the season in the third round against Çaykur Rizespor, having been suspended the first two matches from an outstanding ban. Şahin went on to bag a hat trick against Kayseri Erciyesspor on 21 November 2009. He tallied seven goals by the winter break. Şahin went on to score several more goals, finishing with 15 in 29 matches. At the end of the 2009–10 season, Samsunspor met with three clubs inquiring about Şahin's availability. After several meetings, the club came to terms with MKE Ankaragücü on a $900,000 transfer fee, as well as two players, in exchange for Şahin. Şahin signed a five-year contract with his new club. After battling injuries, he made his debut for the club and scored his first Süper Lig goal in a 4–2 defeat of Galatasaray on 17 October 2010.

== International career ==
Şahin was called up to the Turkey national under-21 football team in 2008. He made his debut in a match against Ukraine on 10 February 2009.

== Career statistics ==
Club	Season	League		Cup		Europe		Total	
Club	Season	Apps	Goals	Apps	Goals	Apps	Goals	Apps	Goals
Samsunspor	2006–07	2	0	0	0	-	-	2	0
Samsunspor	2007–08	18	3	0	0	-	-	18	3
Samsunspor	2008–09	29	8	2	2	-	-	31	10
Samsunspor	2009–10	29	14	2	1	-	-	31	15
Samsunspor	Total	78	25	4	3	-	-	82	28
MKE Ankaragücü	2010–11	10	2	4	0	0	0	14	2
MKE Ankaragücü	Total	10	2	4	0	0	0	14	2
Career total		88	27	8	3	0	0	96	30
