= C Case =

Irish legal case on the right of a teenage rape victim to travel for an abortion

- Court: High Court (Ireland)
- Full case name: A and B, Applicants, v. Eastern Health Board, District Judge Mary Fahy and C, Respondents and The Attorney General, Notice Party
- Started: 28 November 1997
- Decided: 25 November 1997
- Citation: [1998] 1 IR 464; [1998] 1 ILRM 460

Court membership
- Judge sitting: Hugh Geoghegan

Keywords
- Abortion; Right to travel; Right to life; Constitution of Ireland

A and B v Eastern Health Board, commonly known as the C Case, was a legal case in Ireland on whether a thirteen-year-old Irish Traveller girl (known as C), who had become pregnant as a result of rape and was suicidal, could be permitted to travel abroad to obtain an abortion. She was in the care of the Eastern Health Board (EHB), an organ of the Irish state, and the abortion was resisted by her parents, the applicants in the case. Abortion law in Ireland at the time of the case made abortion inaccessible within Ireland; however, in the X Case (1992), the Supreme Court had ruled that abortion was permissible under the Constitution where there was a threat to a woman's life, including a risk of suicide.

== Facts ==
On 27 August 1997, a then 13-year-old Irish Traveller girl, subsequently referred to as Ms C, had been babysitting the children of fellow Traveller 24-year-old Simon McGinley in the west Dublin suburb of Balgaddy, when McGinley had offered to drive her home to her parents caravan in nearby Clondalkin. However, McGinley drove past the halting site and after punching Ms C he then brutally raped her in the back of his Toyota HiAce van. McGinley eventually drove her home and warned her not to report him to the authorities or he would slash her with a Stanley knife. Ms C did inform her parents and after being examined at Crumlin Children's Hospital she was given emergency contraception.

Ms C's family began to receive threats for reporting the rape, and she was soon taken into the care of the Eastern Health Board (EHB) under the Child Care Act 1991. In late October 1997, Ms C discovered she was pregnant as the result of the rape. She became suicidal and after her own parents raised the possibly of terminating the pregnancy during court hearings in November 1997, the EHB made an official application to bring her to the UK for an abortion. However, following backlash from anti-abortion groups, her parents applied via the Children's Court to prevent the Eastern Health Board from facilitating an abortion in England. Ms C's parents were accompanied to court by representatives of pressure groups Youth Defence and Family & Life, who were alleged to be providing legal advice.

== Law ==
Abortion was illegal in Ireland at the time of the case. It was prohibited under sections 58 and 59 of the Offences against the Person Act 1861, and Article 40.3.3° of the Constitution of Ireland protected the right to life of the unborn. The substantive clause was added by the Eighth Amendment of the Constitution in 1983. A further clause was added by the Thirteenth Amendment in 1992 in response to the X Case, protecting the freedom to travel to another state to obtain an abortion.

The 2018 abortion referendum, held in May 2018, approved an amendment replacing the wording of Article 40.3.3° with a permissive clause allowing legislation by the Oireachtas. Legislation regulating abortion, the Health (Regulation of Termination of Pregnancy) Act 2018, was enacted in December 2018. Abortion services began on 1 January 2019.

== Court case ==
On 21 November 1997, the District Court made an order that C could leave the state. The parents challenged this order in the High Court. Judge Hugh Geoghegan upheld the original order, allowing the EHB to bring her to the UK for an abortion. The court relied on the judgment in the X Case and on the Thirteenth Amendment.

== Aftermath ==
Ms C had an abortion in the UK in December 1997, accompanied by two officers from the Garda Síochána and her EHB guardian. Her parents were opposed to the abortion, and communicated regularly with Youth Defence.

On 18 December 1998, Simon McGinley was sentenced to 12 years imprisonment after pleading guilty to the rape of thirteen-year-old Ms. C, with Judge John Quirke suspending the final four years on condition that McGinley undergo sex offenders therapy in prison.

== Reaction ==
Desmond Connell, the Catholic Archbishop of Dublin, strongly criticised the ruling; however, he declined to fund a Supreme Court challenge.

I have many concerns about the decision... I have deep reservations about the re-affirmation by the courts of the notion that there are circumstances where abortion is medically justifiable. The testimony in the X Case, relating to suicidal tendencies, was already controversial.

— Desmond Connell, "Archbishop's deep sadness at 'amazing' court decision". Irish Independent. 29 November 1997. p. 13.

Archbishop Connell claimed that abortion caused mental health problems:

at a psychiatric level, abortion would appear to cause more problems than it solves, even were we to judge the issue on its medical implications alone. One this last point, it is clear from the significant risk of psychological problems following abortion, particularly among those who have abortions in their teens or who are ambivalent and/or unsupported, that this unhappy child would be better served if she received the highest degree of medical and psychological support along with the continuation of her pregnancy.

— Desmond Connell, "Archbishop's deep sadness at 'amazing' court decision". Irish Independent. 29 November 1997. p. 13.

Youth Defence picketed the home of EHB Chair Róisín Shortall because she did not stop the case.

The Pro Life Campaign criticised the EHB, and called for a full inquiry.

== Legacy ==
The woman at the centre of the case has occasionally spoken about her experiences, but not revealed her identity. She found the abortion traumatic, and did not understand what was going on at the time. She did not know that she would be getting an abortion, and thought that the hospital was going to deliver her baby. She eventually named and sought a death certificate for the aborted child. She has expressed that she wishes the child would have been put up for adoption. She made numerous attempts on her own life following the procedure, but eventually gave birth to a son who helps keep her mentally stable.

It has been living with me, still to this day it's living with me. There is still stuff to this day with nightmares, I can't sleep and I'm on medication. I'm still living in fear, fear all the time. No one understands how you feel, how a rape victim feels after being raped. It never goes away no matter how people say it does. It lives with you constantly. Fears and everything that goes with, the nightmares, the whole lot

— C

== Post Trial Developments ==
Simon McGinley was released from Arbour Hill Prison in November 2003. In 2009, McGinley was sentenced to 21 years in prison after being found guilty of the rape of an 86-year-old woman in Monaghan the previous year. McGinley was again released from Arbour Hill prison in September 2022 and thereafter moved to the Dundalk area, with the conditions of his release resulting in him being banned from engaging in door-to-door sales and from cold calling to stranger's houses.

McGinley was remanded in custody to Cloverhill Prison in August 2023 after alleged breaches of the conditions of his release, relating to him cold calling to a house in County Louth regarding the sale of a car and intimidating a teenage girl who lived there. McGinley was also accused of breaching the conditions of the Sex Offenders Act in February 2023 at an address in Skerries, where he was caught power washing the driveway of an elderly lady. In January 2024, the charge of breaching the Sex Offenders Act in Skerries was struck out after the alleged injured party disclosed that she did not want to attend court. However, McGinley was convicted of breaching the Sex Offenders Act in County Louth and sentenced to 30 months in prison, as well as having the suspended portion of a previous sentence he received for rape reactivated. McGinley was finally released from the Midlands Prison in early July 2025.

Despite being under Probation Service supervision and after failing to inform Gardaí of his whereabouts after his release, McGinley absconded from Ireland in defiance of his legal obligations under the Sex Offenders Act and a warrant for his arrest was issued in September 2025. McGinley was thereafter arrested on the west coast of Scotland for breaching road traffic laws and possession of an offensive weapon, and on 28 October 2025 he was remained in custody after appearing at Ayr Sheriff Court. McGinley was eventually extradited to Ireland in April 2026 and held at Cloverhill Prison. At a court hearing in June 2026, McGinley plead guilty to failing to notify Gardaí about a change to his address and other breaches of his Sex Offenders Order, while his defence team claimed he was forced to leave the country after coming under threat from local residents after his release from prison was published in national newspapers. In October 2026, McGinley was sentenced to 30 months in prison for breaches of the Sex Offenders’ Act in not notifying the authorities of a change of address or disclosing he was leaving the country.
