= Population Research Institute =

Population Research Institute may refer to:

- An institute at Pennsylvania State University ("A Community of Population Scientists at Penn State")
- Australian Population Research Institute, Monash University
- Population Research Institute (organization) an anti-abortion organization in Front Royal, Virginia, US

== See also ==
Category:Population research organizations
