= F. Tillman Durdin =

American journalist

Frank Tillman Durdin (March 30, 1907 – July 7, 1998) was a longtime foreign correspondent for The New York Times. During his career, Durdin reported on the Second Sino-Japanese War (1937–1945), the collapse of European colonial rule in Indo-China, and the emergence of the People's Republic of China. He was the first American journalist granted a visa to reenter China in 1971.

== Biography ==
Durdin was born in Elkhart, Texas. He attended Texas Christian University. After graduation, he was a reporter for newspapers in Texas and California, as well as an editor and reporter of English newspapers in China from 1930 to 1937.

Durdin joined The New York Times in 1937 as a foreign correspondent in Asia, Africa and Europe. He served in that position until 1961, covering the Chinese Civil War, combat during World War II in the Pacific, post-war China, and the French-Indochina War. He was a member of the Times's editorial board from 1961 to 1941. Durdin was then a correspondent in Australia and the southwestern Pacific area until 1967, wrote about the unrest in East Pakistan (now Bangladesh), then became the paper's Hong Kong bureau chief, based there until his retirement in 1974.

== Reports about the Nanjing massacre ==
Durdin was in Nanjing in 1937 when it fell to the Imperial Japanese Army. He left Nanjing on the USS Oahu on December 15, 1937. Durdin's report was one of the first printed accounts of the Nanjing Massacre. Although Durdin is often credited as being the first to inform the non-Japanese world about events in occupied Nanjing, it was actually Archibald Steele of the Chicago Daily News who broke the news, bribing a crew member of the Oahu to send his story in. In what David Askew characterizes as "one of the best journalistic accounts of the fall of Nanking", Durdin reported all the major issues of the Nanjing incident: the murder of civilians, the execution of Chinese soldiers, conscription, looting, torture, and rape.

In 1937, he reported that Japanese soldiers committed mass killings of Chinese soldiers at the Hsiakwan [Yijiang] Gate, but in 1987 he recanted, admitting that the deaths were caused by other Chinese soldiers tasked with stopping escape from the city

== Reports about the February 28 massacre ==
Together with his wife Peggy, Durdin was one of the few Western reporters to write about the February 28 massacre in Taiwan in 1947. Tillman Durdin's account in The New York Times and Peggy Durdin's articles in The Nation provided a gripping account of the events of what came to be known as the "February 28 incident", the start of 40 years of martial law in Taiwan.

== Books ==
- Durdin, Tillman (1971). The New York Times Report from Red China. Quadrangle Books. ISBN 0-8129-0342-0.
- Durdin, Tillman (1953). China and the world. Foreign Policy Association.
- Durdin, Tillman (1965). Southeast Asia. Atheneum.
