= Paul Marx (monk) =

American activist (1920–2010)

- Born: May 8, 1920; St. Michael, Minnesota, US
- Died: March 20, 2010 (aged 89); St. Cloud, Minnesota
- Occupation(s): Catholic priest, monk and sociologist

Paul Benno Marx, OSB (May 8, 1920 – March 20, 2010) was an American Roman Catholic priest and Benedictine monk, family sociologist, writer, and one of the leaders of the anti-abortion movements.

He was professed on 11 July 1942 and ordained on June 15, 1947. Marx started the Sociology Department at Saint John's University, Collegeville, Minnesota in 1957 and headed it as a department chair until 1970. Marx was the driving force in creating the local universitarian Human Life Center, furthermore the anti-abortion organizations Human Life International and Population Research Institute.

== Family ==
Né Benno William Marx, he was born in St. Michael, Minnesota as the fifteenth child of devoutly religious parents, George and Elizabeth. He was raised on a dairy farm. There were thirteen girls and four boys (three children died in infancy) in the family.

== Activism ==
One of Marx's books, The Death Peddlers: War on the Unborn, belongs to the basic literature of the anti-abortion movement. He was a spiritual mentor for his successor at PRI, Steven W. Mosher.

Marx regularly edited material about natural family planning and led HLI until 1999. In 2007, he received HLI's Cardinal von Galen Award. Other recognitions gained by the monk of Saint John's Abbey, Collegeville include the Cardinal John J. O'Connor Pro-Life Award from Legatus (2003), Family Life International's "Faithful for Life Award" (2004) as well as PRI's Founder's Award. Former US President Ronald Reagan once stated in a letter to Marx:

“You can be proud of all you’ve done to summon this nation and others to reflection and positive action on issues affecting the sanctity of human life. God bless you.”

== Books ==
- The life and work of Virgil Michel. Dissertation, Washington, D.C.: Catholic University of America Press, 1957.
- Virgil Michel And The Liturgical Movement. Collegeville, Minnesota: Liturgical Press, 1957.
- The Death Peddlers: War on the Unborn. Front Royal, Virginia: HLI, reprint, 1998, ISBN 978-0814604014.
- Death without dignity: Killing for mercy. Collegeville, Minnesota: Liturgical Press, 2nd edition, 1978, ISBN 978-0814608692; later in the modified version And Now Euthanasia: HLI, 2nd edition, 1985.
- Confessions of a Profile Missionary: The Journeys of Fr. Paul Marx. Gaithersburg, Maryland: HLI, 1988, ISBN 1559220201.
- Fighting for Life: The Further Journeys of Fr Paul Marx. HLI, 1989, ISBN 978-1559220279.
- The Apostle of Life. HLI, 1990, ISBN 978-1559220293.
- The Flying Monk (Still Fighting for Life). HLI, 1990, ISBN 978-1559220286.
- The Warehouse Priest. HLI, 1993, ISBN 978-1559220316.
- Faithful for Life– autobiography. HLI, 1997, ISBN 978-1559220453.
- The Pro-Life Wisdom of Fr. Paul Marx: The Apostle of Life – a collection of comments. HLI, 2008, ISBN 978-1559220552.
