= Rebecca Kiessling =

American attorney and activist (born 1969)

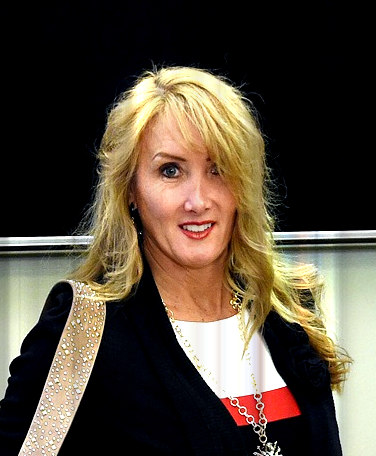
- Kiessling in 2022
- Born: July 22, 1969 (age 57); Michigan, United States
- Occupations: Activist; public speaker
- Known for: Anti-abortion activism
- Spouse: Robert Kiessling (m. 1998; c. divorced 2021)
- Children: 6
- Website: rebeccakiessling.com

Rebecca Kiessling (born July 22, 1969) is an American anti-abortion activist and attorney. Her advocacy is focused on criminalizing abortion, including in the case of pregnancy from rape.

== Early life ==
Kiessling was raised in Detroit by Larry and Gail Wasser, who raised her and her adopted brother in the Jewish faith. She graduated from law school at age 23. During law school, she converted to Catholicism.

In the 1960s, Kiessling's mother was raped at knifepoint and fell pregnant following the assault. She then was advised by her rape counselor that she obtain an illegal abortion in back alley clinics since the elective procedure was illegal by Michigan law at that time, and consulting a legal physician would have been costly. However, she was deterred from obtaining an abortion due to the unsanitary area and practices there. After she gave birth to Kiessling, Kiessling's mother gave her daughter up for adoption.

At age 19, Kiessling met with her birth mother, Joann, who had told her that her biological father was a serial rapist as well as "Caucasian and of large build".

== Anti-abortion activism ==
In March 2017, Kiessling spoke for the Irish anti-abortion group Youth Defence at the Citizens' Assembly, which was debating Ireland's constitutional ban on abortion.

=== Efforts denying convicted rapists parental rights ===
Kiessling supports the termination of rapists' parental rights, both taking cases as a pro-bono attorney and advocating for the passage of laws requiring judges to terminate custody if there is "clear and convincing evidence" of rape. In 2008, she represented a mother from Michigan who had been raped at the age of 12, and her rapist granted joint custody of the then 8-year-old child. Upon reviewing the case, the judge rescinded his previous ruling granting convicted rapist Christopher Mirasolo joint custody, and furthermore pledged to take action to avoid a repeat of his controversial ruling.

In 2019, Alabama passed a law requiring judges to end the parental rights of those convicted of first-degree rape, first-degree sodomy and incest. Kiessling argues conviction-based parental right termination leave some women vulnerable, due to the low percentage of rape reports and furthermore, convictions. At the time, Kiessling stated "We need to mandate judges in family-law matters to immediately suspend any legal or physical custody or parenting time if the court finds by clear and convincing evidence that the child was conceived in rape." As of 2019, Minnesota is the only state to not have a law ending parental rights for those convicted of rape or incest.

== Personal life ==
Rebecca married Robert "Bob" Kiessling in 1998 and the couple had three biological daughters. They also adopted three other children, including two brothers who shared the same birth mother. An adopted daughter, Cassandra "Cassie" Grace, who was born with a fatal fetal diagnosis, died in 2000 when she was just over a month old. In 2020, Kiessling announced that her adopted sons, Caleb and Kyler, died that same year at ages 20 and 18, respectively from an accidental drug overdose. Kiessling and her husband have since divorced.

Initially raised in the Jewish faith, Kiessling converted to Christianity at age 23, following an invitation to attend Mass by a friend after suffering domestic abuse from a boyfriend with whom she attended law school.

In 2010, Kiessling severed ties to her adoptive parents, instead granting parental rights to her biological mother.

== See also ==
- Gianna Jessen
