= Youth Defence =

Irish anti-abortion organisation

- Formation: 1986; 40 years ago; reformed 1992; 34 years ago
- Type: Social conservatism; Anti-abortion
- Headquarters: Dublin, Ireland
- Spokesperson: Niamh Uí Bhriain; Íde Nic Mhatúna
- Former Leader: Justin Barrett
- Website: Official website

Youth Defence is an Irish organisation that opposes legalisation of abortion. It was founded in 1986 (during the 1986 divorce referendum), lay dormant, and was reformed in 1992 following the judgment in the X Case. It shared offices with the Eurosceptic group Cóir, but is not openly aligned to any specific political party. It is linked to neo-fascist organisations in Italy, Germany and Great Britain.

== Foundation and overview ==
Youth Defence was founded during the 1986 divorce referendum to campaign against the legalisation of divorce. Niamh Nic Mhathúna was one of the spokespeople. They had sixty members, most of whom were children of Family Rights Council members. There is not much activity from the group after that referendum.

During the X Case in 1992, Youth Defence reemerged, campaigning against abortion. They claimed to be newly founded by Niamh Nic Mhathúna as well as six other anti-abortion activists including Peter Scully (who co-founded Family & Life in 1996), Úna Bean Nic Mhathúna and Una's husband Séamus Mac Mathúna.

James Reynolds, later deputy president of the National Party was a County Longford Youth Defence member in the early 1990s.

In 2015, the chairman of Youth Defence was Dr. Eoghan De Faoite.

== Neo-Nazi links ==
The National Library of Ireland formerly described Youth Defence as "a pro-life organisation and lobby group with strong neo-Nazi links". Far-right Irish nationalist Justin Barrett is a former Public Relations Officer and leader of the group. During the 2002 Second Treaty of Nice referendum it was revealed that Justin Barrett had attended and spoken at neo-Nazi party events in Germany and Italy. He initially denied the charges, and threatened newspapers with libel suits, but later conceded that he had spoken at those events. Youth Defence denied having "any relationship whatsoever" with the National Democratic Party of Germany, calling it a "media smear campaign". The Pro Life Campaign, another Irish anti-abortion group, strongly criticised Barrett for taking part in these events.

No amount of evasion or spin on Mr Barrett's part can explain away the seriousness of attending such conferences. It is nonsense to contend that speaking at a neo-fascist rally somehow serves the interest of building a more caring pro-life culture or the broader human rights agenda, which he claims to espouse. The groups with which Mr Barrett and Youth Defence are reported to be associated have an agenda of social exclusion and political extremism

— John Smyth, Pro Life Campaign spokesman

Justin Barrett left Youth Defence in 2004. By 2016, a spokesperson at Youth Defence said that they had never heard of Justin Barrett, or ever had any dealing with him.

=== British far-right groups ===
In 1993 Youth Defence wrote a letter to Candour, a far right magazine in the UK, introducing Youth Defence and ending with a request for funds.

=== German far-right group ===
Barrett has spoken at events organised by the neo-Nazi National Democratic Party of Germany (NPD) several times, and been the guest of honour at a NPD rally in Passau, Germany in 2000, in which anti-semitic speeches, peppered with quotes from Adolf Hitler were given, alongside claims that "Germany was the biggest victim of the second World War". Hundreds of skinheads gave standing ovations to elderly Nazis. The NPD confirmed that they have been in contact with Youth Defence for at least 6 years before.

Justin Barrett was an honorary guest at our event in Passau. I invited him. He sat with the delegates. We have been in contact with his group since 1996. We are friendly with his Youth Defence organisation.

— Holger Apfel, then deputy leader of the NPD

He attended two conferences, in October 1999 and 2000, organised by the youth wing of the NDP, the JN, alongside famous American white nationalist William Luther Pierce. The JN has spoken about how Youth Defence were an important part of their network.

Of particular attraction was the participation of... the leader of the National Alliance from the USA, Dr William Pierce and, last but not least, the leader of a noteworthy Irish anti-abortion group, Justin Barret (sic) from Youth Defense (sic).

— Young National Democrats (JN) report on the 1999 conference

A leading far-right politician in Germany has described the anti-abortion group Youth Defence as "an important part of our international network". Youth Defence is the backbone of the No to Nice Campaign, whose chief spokesman is Mr Justin Barrett. ... Mr Sascha Rossmüller, leader of the Young National Democrats (JN), youth wing of the extremist National Democratic Party (NPD), told The Irish Times: "share many important interests." The German authorities say the JN began to take on neo-Nazi characteristics in 1996.

— The Irish Times

=== Italian far-right group ===
Barrett and Youth Defence founder Niamh Uí Bhriain spoke at Meeting for friendship among peoples in Rimini, Italy, alongside Forza Nuova founder and leader Roberto Fiore in August 2000.

The Forza Nuova website, in June 2001, reported that Justin Barrett had attended many Forza Nuova events in Italy (in Milan, and Bologna). He attended and spoke at a Forza Nuova meeting in Milan in November 2002. Barrett shared a platform with Roberto Fiore at a rally of flag-waving Italian fascists at the Hotel Miramar on 20 and 21 July 2001 in the Italian city of Civitanova Marche. At the rally, Barrett was joined by Mario Di Giovanni, Youth Defence's representative in Italy. A group of Forza Nuova students, led by the then 25-year-old Marco Gladi, visited Ireland in 2001 to 'study' with Youth Defence. In an editorial on the Forza Nuova website, the movement calls itself a "friend" of Barrett and praises his efforts to defeat the Nice Treaty.

As part of the dirty war waged by "liberals" against "nationals", the greatest exponent of the nationalist front Justin Barrett, he was attacked in a press campaign of the kind to which we were accustomed us in the past. FN and NPD are, in the mind of the accusers, friends whose Barrett should be ashamed

— Forza Nuova website in October 2002

== Campaigns ==
=== Picketing of Politicians' houses ===
In 1997 Youth Defence picketed the home of then Labour TD Róisín Shortall. This terrified her neighbours, especially the graphic placards. Although there were no arrests, the Gardai took protestors names. Róisín Shortall was chairwoman of the Eastern Health Board, and the protest was due to the then current C Case.

In 1999 the group picketed the home of then Taoiseach Bertie Ahern. Archbishop Desmond Connell has kept his distance from the group, criticising its "American-style tactics".

In November 1996, up to 50 members of Youth Defence picketed the home of Minister for Health Michael Noonan in Limerick. Six arrests were made over the content of posters at a follow on protest in Limerick. A picket in January 1997 passed off peacefully, among heavy Garda presence. Fianna Fáil politician Máire Geoghegan-Quinn criticised the picketing of Minister Noonan's house.

=== 1999 Irish Family Planning Association picket ===
In March 1999 Youth Defence picketed a clinic of the Irish Family Planning Association on Cathal Brugha Street. The IFPA got a High Court order restraining Youth Defence from picketing its offices or intimidating its employees or customers. Youth Defence did not appear in court. Two members, Aoife and Ciara Ni Aodhan, did not abide by the order and were fined £250 each. Youth Defence members eventually won a Supreme Court challenge to the order in 2004.

=== 2012 anti-abortion campaign ===
In June 2012 Youth Defence began their "Abortion tears her life apart" campaign. This campaign consisted of billboard signs, posters, and many members of the group handing out flyers. The campaign was across many cities in Ireland.

Pro-choice users of the website Broadsheet.ie encouraged supporters to call upon advertising companies to pull the adverts, saying that the text used misinformation. Legal scholar and Labour Senator Ivana Bacik criticised Youth Defence's decision to show an 18-week-old aborted fetus on the billboard, "although 89 per cent of abortions take place before 13 weeks. The advertisements are grossly offensive." TheJournal.ie later alleged that Youth Defence had breached copyright terms and conditions in using an image of a woman depicted on the posters, by failing to print a disclaimer that the billboard showed a posed model.

On 6 December 2012, Youth Defence took part in a Vigil For Life organised by the Pro Life Campaign, outside Leinster House in Dublin that was attended by several thousand people, as well as Catholic bishops representing the Catholic Church in Ireland. They were protesting any change to Ireland's abortion law, after the death of Savita Halappanavar a few months earlier. They claimed the Irish government had made a "pro-life promise".

They were also involved in the National Vigil For Life organised by the Pro Life Campaign, which took part in July 2013. Official figures put the crowd at 15,000 to 20,000 people, with the organisers claiming 50,000. Youth Defence co-founder Íde Nic Mathúna spoke at the event.

=== 2013 Billboard parked outside Rape Crisis Centre ===
On 27 June 2013, during the public debate on the Protection of Life During Pregnancy Act 2013, a Youth Defence billboard truck parked outside the Dublin Rape Crisis Centre with the anti-abortion slogan of "The abortion bill won't make women safer, it will just kill babies". A photo of the truck was posted to the Broadsheet.ie website. AdMobile, the billboard company, said that the driver was taking a photograph of the truck as required by contract and was unaware of the proximity of the Rape Crisis Centre. AdMobile also said they would no longer run ads for Youth Defence. Youth Defence said at the time that they did not instruct the company to photograph the billboard outside the Rape Crisis Centre, and in July 2016 again denied that they had parked the vehicle, describing the accusation as an "old... vicious lie".

=== Website hacking incident ===
On 9 July 2013, Youth Defence's website was hacked and replaced with a message detailing allegations relating to the group. At the same time, details from their subscriber list were also published, though they were later removed. No organization has claimed responsibility and a representative of Youth Defence has stated that complaints have been made to the Garda Síochána. As of 2021, Youth Defence was no longer maintaining its own website, but had a hosted section on that of the Life Institute.

=== 2016 March for Choice infiltration ===
On 24 September 2016, Youth Defence activists were filmed and photographed attempting to infiltrate the Abortion Rights Campaign's "March for Choice" event. The false flag photograph and sign was later used by the Life Institute on Twitter.

=== Citizens Assembly ===
In 2016 the Irish government set up the Citizens' Assembly, a group of 99 citizens to discuss the Eighth Amendment, and then make recommendation to the government. This is similar to the 2012 Constitutional Convention.

Youth Defence were selected as one of the groups to present to the Citizens' Assembly. They were represented by Rebecca Kiessling, an American anti-abortion campaigner. The majority of Kiessling’s presentation differed from the script she had submitted to the assembly in advance.

== Funding ==
The Irish Times reported in March 2013 that the Standards in Public Office Commission has been attempting to investigate Youth Defense's sources of funding, but that the organisation has thus far refused to cooperate. By law, any organisation involved in political lobbying must declare all donations over €100, can only accept donations of up to €2,500, and cannot accept donations from overseas unless the donor is an Irish citizen or from a corporation that has offices in Ireland.

== See also ==
- Pro Life Campaign
- Iona Institute
