= Human Life International =

American anti-abortion organization

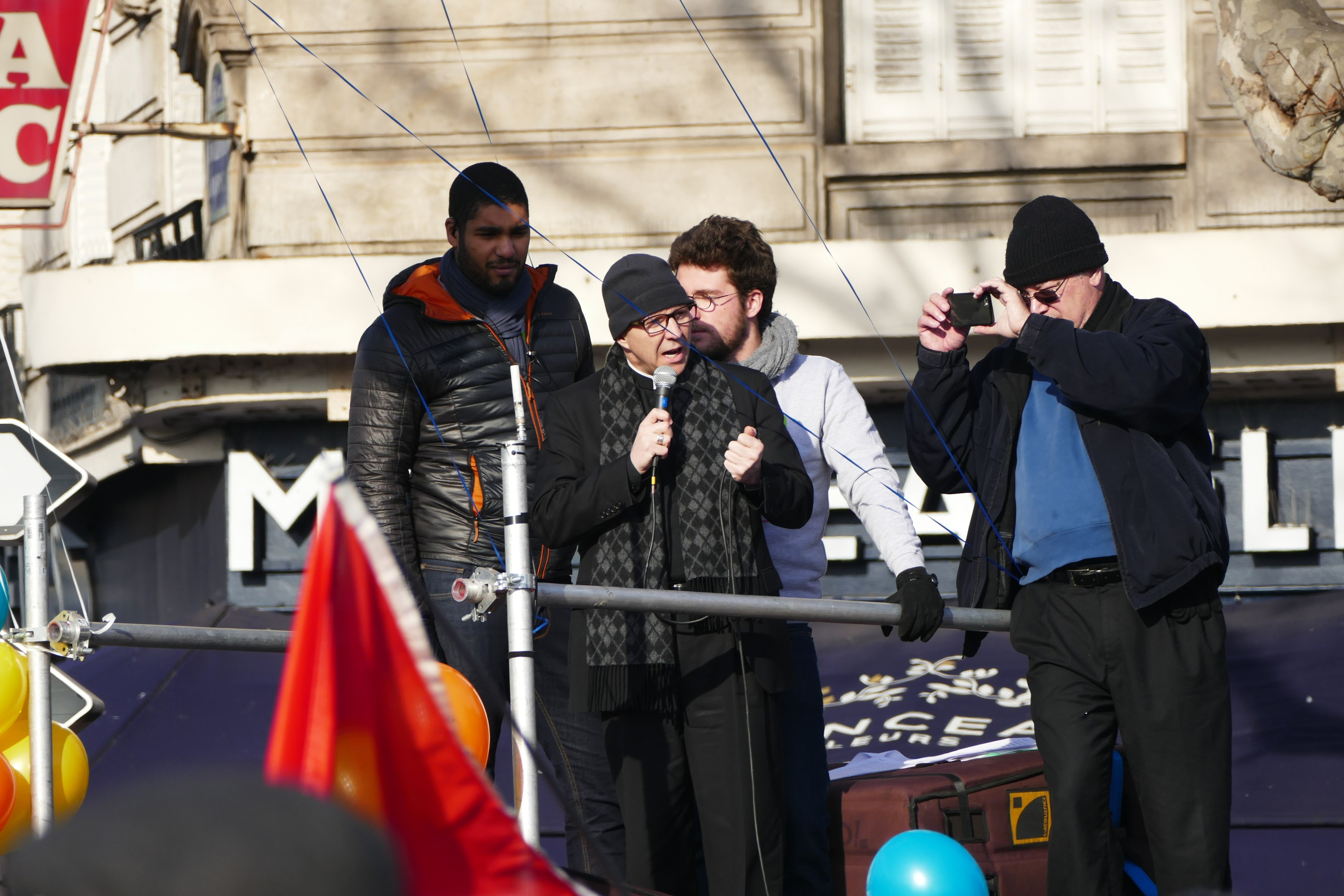
Father Shenan J. Boquet during the Parisian March for Life in 2017.

Human Life International (HLI) is a Roman Catholic, U.S.-based anti-abortion organization. It is one of the largest anti-abortion organizations in the United States. It describes itself as "the largest international pro-life organization in the world", saying that it has affiliates and associates in over 80 countries and has sent representatives to approximately 160. The group is led by clergy. It has been based in Front Royal, Virginia since 1996.

Human Life International was established in 1981 in Gaithersburg, Maryland by Paul Marx, as a continuation of the Human Life Center founded by Marx at Saint John's University, Minnesota in 1972. Its mission is to train and organize anti-abortion movement leaders: priests, crisis pregnancy centers, civic leaders, radio and television programmers, and family counselors. HLI bases its activism on Catholic anti-abortion beliefs, which propose that life begins at conception. The group also advocates against contraceptives. It has supported the criminalization of homosexuality in Uganda.

In the mid-1990s, Jennifer Gonnerman described HLI's anti-abortion campaign as more influential than that of the Operation Save America. In 1997, Human Life International supported the founding of the Center for Family and Human Rights. The group is affiliated with the Population Research Institute. From 2000 to 2014, the group used $7.9 million for anti-abortion causes.

Shenan J. Boquet became president of HLI in November 2011.

In 2017, The Guardian reported that several US crisis pregnancy center (CPC) and anti-abortion groups including Human Life International (HLI), have been providing money and assistance to networks of CPCs in Latin America, as well as lobbying against the liberalization of abortion laws throughout the region. HLI started their network of CPC's in the region in the 1980s, with the total number of locations having increased to approximately 130 CPCs across 20 countries by 2015.

== See also ==
- Care Net
- Heartbeat International (anti-abortion organization)
- Family & Life
