= A Mother's Ordeal =

1993 book by Steven W. Mosher

A Mother's Ordeal: One Woman's Fight Against China's One-Child Policy
- First edition (p/b)
- Author: Steven W. Mosher
- Language: English
- Genre: Biography
- Publisher: Harper Perennial (p/b); Harcourt (h/b)
- Publication date: 1993
- Publication place: United States
- Media type: Print (hardcover, paperback)
- Pages: 335
- ISBN: 978-0151626625

A Mother's Ordeal: One Woman's Fight Against China's One-child Policy is a book written by Steven W. Mosher, President of Population Research Institute. The book is written in biographical style that takes the reader from the earliest memories of Chi-An, a Chinese female born on the year of the founding of the People's Republic of China (1949), through to her seeking asylum in the United States due to her pregnancy, which was illegal due to China's one-child policy.

== Synopsis ==
With names changed to prevent retribution by the Chinese Communist Party (CCP), Mosher writes in the first person about "Chi An", a girl born to a Chinese family with the traditional beliefs that boys were worth more than girls. As such, her family had no birthday celebration for her and did not mark the date of her birth down. The first few chapters cover significant memories from childhood, including the death of her father and the trials underwent by her family during the Great Chinese Famine brought about by agricultural mismanagement as well as highly inflated reports of crop production figures.

Chi An grew up surrounded by the ideology of the Chinese Communist Party and in her youth worked for the CCP. Later in life, Chi An studied to become a nurse where she performed her first abortion at age 16, thus beginning her career as a nurse carrying out the One-child Policy through abortion, contraception, and sterilizations all in efforts to meet the birth quotas imposed by party officials. Chi An finds a suitor and they become married, after a fashion, and have a healthy baby boy as their first child. The couple became pregnant with a second child, but were forced to abort the baby as it was illegal.

Chi An takes a job at the Liaoning Truck Factory as a company nurse, where all female employees are required once a month to write down on a public message board that they are obeying the CCP and its single-child directives by not becoming pregnant. Around this time, Chi An's husband is granted a student visa to study abroad in the United States. Chi An's husband invited her and their child to the United States to be with him after they had received temporary visas. During their time in the United States, Chi An becomes pregnant. Her superiors at the Liaoning Truck Factory and those involved in the enforcement of the One-child policy pressure Chi An to abort her child as it is a second child and thus illegal. In the story, Chi An reveals that CCP members visit her family and threaten them with punitive action unless "remedial measures" are taken, that is to say, an abortion on the second child. Chi An and her husband seek asylum in the United States in order to live there and have their second child far away from the reach of the CCP. With the help of Mosher, Chi An and family are granted asylum.
