= Steven W. Mosher =

American social scientist (born 1948)

Steven Westley Mosher (born May 9, 1948) is an American social scientist, anti-abortion activist, neoconservative, anti-communist, and president of the Population Research Institute (PRI), which opposes population control and abortion. In the early 1990s, he was the director of the Claremont Institute's Asian Study Center, as well as a member of the US Commission on Broadcasting to China. He is the author of several books concerning China.

== Life and career ==
Mosher was born in 1948 to working-class parents in Scotia, California, and spent his early years in Fresno, California. He enlisted in the U.S. Navy in May 1968, attended Nuclear Power School, and was selected for the Seaman to Admiral-21 program. He received a B.S. degree in Biological Oceanography from the University of Washington in 1971, graduated summa cum laude, and received a commission as an ensign in the U.S. Navy. The following year he earned an M.S. in Biological Oceanography. For the next three years, he served with the U.S. Seventh Fleet in the Far East, achieving the rank of Lieutenant. In early 1976, after his naval service, he enrolled in the Chinese language program of the Chinese University of Hong Kong, completing the two-year course of study in nine months. Awarded a three-year National Science Foundation fellowship, he was admitted to the doctoral program in anthropology at Stanford University, earning an M.A. in East Asian Studies in 1977, and an M.A. in Anthropology in 1978, and carrying out anthropological fieldwork on rural communities in China.

=== Visit to China and expulsion from Stanford ===
In 1979/80 Mosher became the first American scholar to conduct a full-length study scrutinizing a Communist Chinese Commune. He was given early access to China at the request of Jimmy Carter to Deng Xiaoping. He also traveled to Guizhou, then a somewhat remote and rarely visited part of China's southwest. Mosher is known in Chinese as Mao Sidi. (Chinese: 毛思迪; pinyin: Máosīdí), In 1981 Mosher was accused of bribing officials, briefly detained, and denied re-entry to China by the communist government, which considered that he had broken its laws and acted unethically.

Mosher was dismissed from Stanford University's Ph.D. program for "lack of candor" over his use of data on China after he published an article in Taiwan about his experiences in Guangdong. This expulsion occurred shortly before the publication of Broken Earth which revealed, among other things, that forced abortions were common in Guangdong as a part of the one-child policy. He also released photographs of Chinese women undergoing forced abortions that photographs showed the faces of the women, a possible violation of personal privacy according to standards of anthropological ethics.

Mosher's dismissal from the Ph.D. program became a cause célèbre in the academic world, as some said that Stanford acted under pressure from the Chinese government, which threatened to withhold permission for Stanford researchers to visit China. However, Stanford said that its concern was that Mosher's informants had been put in jeopardy and that this was contrary to anthropological ethics.

According to Mosher's book, Journey to the Forbidden China, he had a travel permit signed by the proper authority, Section Chief Liu of the Canton Public Security Office, to go into the "forbidden area" of Guizhou because it was en route to his destination of Sichuan. Mosher had given a copy of the travel permit to the American consulate before he met with the Chinese authorities to discuss the incident.

In the period after the Mosher controversy, it became much more difficult for American anthropologists to work in China. Many other anthropologists from the United States were limited to a three-week stay.

=== Activism ===
Mosher is president of the anti-abortion Population Research Institute. He successfully lobbied the George W. Bush administration to withhold funding from the United Nations Population Fund. Mosher is also a member of the Committee on the Present Danger: China, an American neoconservative and anti-communist foreign policy interest group.

=== Personal life ===
Mosher married Maggie So, a Hong Kong Chinese woman of Guangdong descent; they divorced in 1981. Still in the early 1980s, he married Hwang Hui Wa, an assistant professor of English and Chinese at Fu Hsing Technical College, in Taiwan. Mosher, a convert to Catholicism whose spiritual mentor was the Population Research Institute founder, Paul Marx, lives in Virginia with his third wife, Vera. As of 2012, he has nine children.

== Selected bibliography ==
Steven Mosher has authored the following books, as well as numerous articles and op-eds:

- Broken Earth: The Rural Chinese. Free Press imprint of Simon & Schuster (1984), ISBN 978-0-02-921720-7
- Journey To The Forbidden China (1985)
- China Misperceived: American Illusions and Chinese Reality (1990)
- A Mother's Ordeal: One Woman's Fight Against China's One Child Policy (1993)
- Hegemon: China's Plan to Dominate Asia and the World. Encounter Books (2002), ISBN 978-1-893554-08-5
- Population Control: Real Costs, Illusory Benefits (2008)
- Growing Chinese Power—to What End (with Chuck DeVore). Human Events / Eagle Publishing, Inc. (2012)
- China Attacks. CreateSpace Independent Publishing Platform / Kindle Direct Publishing; 3rd edition (2013), ISBN 978-1-4819-7380-9
- Bully of Asia: Why ′China's Dream′ Is the New Threat to World Order. Regnery Publishing (2017), ISBN 978-1-62157-696-9
- The Politically Incorrect Guide to Pandemics. Regnery Publishing (2022), ISBN 1-68451-277-8 ISBN 978-1-68451-277-5
- The Devil and Communist China: From Mao Down to Xi. TAN Books (2024), ISBN 978-1-5051-2650-1
