= Citizens' Assembly (Ireland) =

Irish body formed to consider political and social issues

Bilingual logo of the Citizens' Assembly

The Citizens' Assembly (Irish: An Tionól Saoránach and also known as We The Citizens) is a citizens' assembly established in Ireland in 2016 to consider several political questions including the Constitution of Ireland. Questions considered include: abortion, fixed term parliaments, referendums, population ageing, and climate change. Over 18 months a report is produced on each topic. The government is required to respond officially to the reports in the Oireachtas (parliament); as of 9 April 2019 responses have been given on three of the five topics. (Note: The fourth and fifth topics were covered by a single report, submitted on 21 June 2018. A response was still outstanding on 9 April 2019.)

== Background ==
The Citizens' Assembly was a successor to the 2012–14 Constitutional Convention, which was established by the Oireachtas in accordance with the government programme agreed by the Fine Gael–Labour coalition formed after the 2011 general election. Convention members were a chairperson nominated by the government, 33 representatives chosen by political parties, and 66 randomly chosen citizens. Meeting over 15 months, it considered seven constitutional issues previously specified by the Oireachtas and two more of its own choosing. It made 18 recommendations for constitutional amendments and 20 for other changes to laws or Oireachtas standing orders; the government accepted some, rejected others, and referred others to committees for further consultation. In 2015 Taoiseach Enda Kenny entertained the possibility of a similar body meeting after the next general election, which occurred in 2016. In the buildup to the election, various politicians proposed changes to Irish abortion law, including repeal of the Eighth Amendment of the Constitution, which guaranteed a foetal right to life. In November 2015, Kenny promised "a Citizen's Convention on the constitution, or whatever title would be appropriate" to address the issue.

== Establishment ==
The programme agreed by the Fine Gael–independent minority government formed after the 2016 election included this commitment:

We will establish a Citizens' Assembly, within six months, and without participation by politicians, and with a mandate to look at a limited number of key issues over an extended time period. These issues will not be limited to those directly pertaining to the constitution and may include issues such as, for example how we, as a nation, best respond to the challenges and opportunities of an ageing population. That said, we will ask the Citizens' Assembly to make recommendations to the Dáil on further constitutional changes, including on the Eighth Amendment, on fixed term parliaments and on the manner in which referenda are held (e.g. should 'super referendum days', whereby a significant number of referenda take place on the same day, be held).

On 13 July 2016, Damien English moved a resolution in the 32nd Dáil (lower house) approving the "calling of a Citizens' Assembly" to consider the four issues specified in the government programme and "such other matters as may be referred to it". A Green Party amendment was accepted which added "how the State can make Ireland a leader in tackling climate change" to the list of topics. Sinn Féin and AAA–PBP amendments were rejected. An analogous resolution was passed in the 25th Seanad (upper house) on 15 July.

In July 2019 Eoghan Murphy introducing legislation related to the "Dublin Citizens' Assembly" and the "Citizens' Assembly 2019". The Irish Times viewed these as lacking the justification for the original Citizens' Assembly, in that they relate to "purely political issue[s] which TDs are well capable of deciding".

== Personnel ==
=== Members ===
Members of each assembly consist of 99 citizens and the chair for a total of 100 members. The chairperson was Mary Laffoy, a former judge at the Supreme Court of Ireland.

The 99 other members were "citizens entitled to vote at a referendum, randomly selected so as to be broadly representative of Irish society". The representative criteria included gender, age, location, and social class.

For the 66 citizen members of the Constitutional Convention, these 99 plus 99 substitutes were selected by an opinion polling company; Red C won the tender and began selection at the start of September. The Electoral (Amendment) Act 2016 was passed to enable the electoral register to be used in this process. Media were asked not to photograph the citizen members before the inaugural assembly meeting. Members received expenses but no other payment. Of the original 99 members, 17 withdrew before the first working meeting, whose replacements immediately took over; another 11 withdrew before the final abortion meeting, whose replacements did not participate until the assembly moved on to its next topic for discussion. Seven replacements joining in January 2018 were removed the following month when it emerged they were recruited via acquaintances of a Red C employee, who was then suspended, rather than via random selection.

=== Secretariat ===
The assembly's secretariat was drawn from the Civil Service. Its office was at 16 Parnell Square in Dublin. In June 2016 the assembly's cost was estimated at €600,000, drawn from the Department of the Taoiseach, with €200,000 in 2016 and the balance in 2017. In October 2016 the Taoiseach said €2m had been set aside. The total cost to March 2019 was €2,355,557, of which €1,535,133 was spent in 2017.

== Deliberation process ==
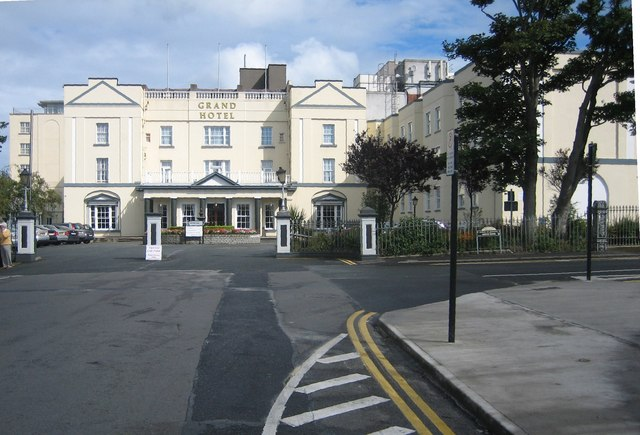
Grand Hotel, Malahide, where the assembly meets.

The inaugural and introductory assembly meeting was held on 15 October 2016 at Dublin Castle. The Grand Hotel, Malahide won the tender to host later, working, meetings. RTÉ News predicted that there would be ten weekend sessions, each "opened with an address from the Chairperson, followed by expert presentations, Q&A sessions and debate, roundtable discussion and a plenary session." Meetings were livestreamed. Submissions from the public were invited. The assembly was originally supposed to complete its business within a year of its first meeting. This was extended in October 2017 and again in March 2018, to 27 April 2018. The government then formally responded to each report. The calendar published in October 2016 included seven three-day working meetings, one in November 2016 and one each month from January to July 2017.

== Assembly matters ==
=== Eighth Amendment ===
The first issue to be considered was the Eighth Amendment, beginning at its first working meeting on 25 November 2016. Enda Kenny in September 2016 estimated it could take "six to seven months" to issue a report, which was referred to an Oireachtas joint committee, This committee, in turn, produced a report for debate in each house. Resolutions to establish the "Special Joint Committee on the Eighth Amendment of the Constitution" were passed on 4 and 13 April 2017 by the Dáil and Seanad respectively.

The assembly's inaugural meeting decided that the abortion issue would be the topic for its first four working meetings, a number later increased to five. An advisory group of five experts was appointed: a medical lawyer, two constitutional lawyers, and two obstetricians. The chairperson said she would investigate claims that an assembly member had publicly expressed pro-choice views on Twitter. In the Dáil, Mattie McGrath complained that two of the five experts had previously expressed dissatisfaction with the existing abortion provisions.

The opposition Anti-Austerity Alliance–People Before Profit (AAA–PBP) scheduled the second stage of a private member's bill repealing the Eighth Amendment for debate in the Dáil on 25 October 2016. Fine Gael opposed the bill on the grounds that it would pre-empt the Citizens' Assembly discussion. Similarly, independent minister Katherine Zappone said that, in deference to the assembly's work, she would oppose the bill despite herself favouring repeal. The Independent Alliance ministers wanted a free vote, which Fine Gael opposed as compromising cabinet collective responsibility. As a compromise, it was agreed that government TDs would oppose the AAA–PBP bill and would not shorten the assembly's timeframe for considering the abortion issue, but that the Oireachtas would expedite the processing of the assembly's report, by establishing the select committee ahead of time and giving it a strict six-month lifespan. Accordingly, Simon Harris, the Minister for Health, moved an amendment to the second-reading motion, that "Dáil Éireann declines to give the Bill a second reading in order that the Citizens' Assembly, established by Resolutions of Dáil Éireann and Seanad Éireann, can conclude its deliberations on the Eighth Amendment which is the subject matter of this Bill, and report to the Oireachtas in the first half of 2017".

Over 13,000 submissions were received from the public by the closing date of 16 December 2016. More than 8,000 were submitted electronically, including over 3,200 the final 24 hours. Submissions were uploaded to the assembly website, with "personal stories or sensitive submissions" deidentified. Based on feedback from members, the chairperson selected 17 submitting organisations to make presentations to the assembly. These were announced on 21 February: Amnesty International Ireland, Atheist Ireland, Coalition to Repeal the Eighth Amendment, Doctors for Choice, Doctors for Life Ireland, Every Life Counts, Family & Life, Irish Catholic Bishops' Conference, Irish Family Planning Association, Parents for Choice, Pro Life Campaign, General Synod of the Church of Ireland, Iona Institute, National Women's Council of Ireland, Union of Students in Ireland, Women Hurt, Youth Defence.

==== Votes ====
The final meeting on abortion began on 22 April, with a series of votes held based on the deliberations from the earlier meetings. The first day's votes were on Article 40.3.3°, the subsection of the Constitution added by the Eighth Amendment:

1. It should not be retained in full (by 79 votes to 12)
2. It should be replaced or amended (50 votes) rather than deleted and not replaced (39 votes)
3. It should allow the Oireachtas to legislate (51 votes) rather than making direct provisions within the Constitution itself (38 votes) regarding "termination of pregnancy, any rights of the unborn, and any rights of the pregnant woman"

The second day's votes were recommendations for the envisaged Oireachtas legislation. There were separate votes on a range of potential circumstances in which abortion might be permitted, possibly restricted to a maximum number of weeks' gestation.

Votes for given option, out of a total of 88 votes cast.
Vote no.	Circumstance	Time limit for gestation				Other (Note: Includes abstentions and invalid votes)
Vote no.	Circumstance	Never	12 weeks	22 weeks	No limit	Other
1	Real and substantial physical risk to life of woman	1	8	12	62	5
2	Real and substantial risk to life of woman by suicide	4	9	22	48	5
3	Serious risk to physical health (Note: Members also voted by 60 to 23 that "a distinction should not be drawn between the physical and mental health of the woman".) of woman	6	12	21	43	6
4	Serious risk to mental health of woman	8	15	24	35	6
5	Serious risk to health of woman	8	12	25	40	3
6	Risk to physical health of woman	18	12	26	28	4
7	Risk to mental health of woman	18	12	31	20	7
8	Risk to health of woman	18	10	30	25	5
9	Pregnancy resulting from rape	9	23	25	25	6
10	Fetal abnormality likely to result in death before or shortly after birth	10	6	18	53	1
11	Significant fetal abnormality not likely to result in death before or shortly after birth	17	9	32	25	5
12	Socio-economic reasons	23	24	30	6	5
13	Unrestricted	29	25	23	4	7

Journalist Mary Minihan reported the following week that "the consensus in the Oireachtas is that the assembly's recommendations were an overly-liberal interpretation of the current thinking of middle Ireland on the issue." On 29 June 2017, the assembly's official report was laid before the Oireachtas and published. On 11 July 2017, the Oireachtas Joint Committee agreed its programme for considering the report, including a presentation from the assembly chairperson at a public session on 20 September 2017.

Laffoy was joined at the meeting by the two leaders of the assembly secretariat. She told the committee that the assembly had considered all of article 40.3.3, including the 13th and 14th Amendments (rights to travel and to information) as well as the 8th (right to life of the unborn), because they were "inextricabl[y] link[ed]". Rónán Mullen said he found its process "disturbing" and criticised it for not acknowledging that the 8th amendment had "saved thousands of lives". Lynn Ruane asked why there was no option to vote for "express positive right to abortion access or to bodily autonomy in pregnancy"; the latter was in the assembly report's ancillary list of issues for the Oireachtas to consider. Laffoy regretted that the assembly had not addressed increased illegal online ordering of abortion pills.

The Oireachtas responded to the report by establishing a Joint Committee on the Eighth Amendment, which produced its own report in December 2017, with dissent from pro-life members. The government decided a month later to implement the committee's report. The Thirty-sixth Amendment of the Constitution of Ireland, approved by referendum on 25 May 2018, replaced the constitutional prohibition with a provision allowing the Oireachtas to regulate abortion. The Oireachtas duly passed the Health (Regulation of Termination of Pregnancy) Act 2018 to legalise and regulate abortion, up to 12 weeks' gestation for any reason, and up to viability for fatal fetal abnormality or serious health risk to the pregnant woman.

=== Ageing population ===
The first meetings on "how we best respond to the challenges and opportunities of an ageing population" were held on 10–11 June 2017. In May a second weekend, on 8–9 July, was added to the schedule. The assembly received 120 submissions from the public. The first meeting's main topics were long-term care and independent living. It was addressed by Eamon O'Shea, social gerontology professor at NUI Galway; Pat Healy, social care director at the Health Service Executive; and Michael Browne of Third Age Ireland and the Citizens Information Board. The second meeting focused on pensions and retirement. Votes were taken on 16 questions: 11 yes/no questions and 5 multiple-choice.

==== Votes ====
Yes:no results (of 78 votes cast) on Citizens' Assembly questions dealing with population ageing
No.	Question: Should the government ... ?	Yes:no vote
1	prioritise and implement existing policies and strategies in relation to older people	78:0
3	increase public resources allocated for the care of older people (See also multiple-choice questions 2, 4, and 5)	67:10 (Note: One invalid vote)
6	expedite the current commitment to place home care for older persons on a statutory footing	77:1
7	extend protection regulations from residential care to other care services (See also multiple-choice question 8)	77:1
9	make pension scheme mandatory (additional to State pension scheme)	67:10
10	remove the anomaly between mandatory retirement age (65) and State pension age (66)	75:3
11	abolish the mandatory retirement age	67:11
12	benchmark the State pension to average earnings	69:9
13	mandate greater transparency in private pension fees	78:0
14	backdate the Homemakers Scheme to 1973 (Note: The Homemakers Scheme makes it easier for those who provide full-time care to an incapacitated person to qualify for a State pension. As of December 2016 the maximum backdating is to the scheme's 1994 introduction.)	68:10
15	enhance State support for [family] carers	77:1

===== Multiple-choice questions =====
Assembly members could distribute votes among multiple answers to the multiple-choice questions except question 2.

Question 2
In general, who should be principally responsible for providing required care for older people?

1. Person or family, totally: 1
2. Person or family, mainly : 47
3. State, mainly: 25
4. State, totally: 5 (Note: This value is missing from the source document but can be back-calculated from the other values.)

Question 4
Where do you believe additional funding for care of older people should primarily be spent?

1. Residential care: 122
2. Home care: 198
3. Community-based integrated housing: 186

Question 5
Where do you believe overall funding for care of older people should come from?

1. General taxation: 215
2. Compulsory social insurance: 255
3. Private insurance: 115
4. Public–private cost-sharing: 150

Question 8
If the Government were to decide to extend regulation to other health and care services for older people, what other services do you believe should be regulated?

1. Respite care: 70
2. Day care: 68
3. Home care: 72
4. Supported housing: 71

Question 16
When considering how we respond to the challenges and opportunities of an ageing population, which of these suggestions do you believe are the most important to implement?

1. responsibility for older people should be formally delegated to a dedicated Minister of State for Older People. 72
2. dedicated information service for older people: 71
3. ensure that older people have a stronger voice in determining their own care needs: 69
4. stronger governmental leadership in relation to the prioritisation of the health and social care needs of older people: 65
5. encourage non-financial intergenerational transfers: 57
6. Assisted Decision-Making (Capacity) Act 2015 (Note: The Assisted Decision-Making (Capacity) Act 2015 is the framework for assisting those with impaired capacity to make life decisions, such as via advance healthcare directives and enduring power of attorney.) and elder abuse prevention: 72

On 15 May 2019 Jim Daly, the Minister of State for Mental Health and Older People, gave a written Dáil response in relation to those recommendations within the remit of the Department of Health.

=== Climate change ===
One meeting on climate change was planned, for the weekends starting 30 September and 4 November 2017; the second was added to the schedule on 17 July. Speakers included the chair of the advisory group for a promised "National Dialogue on Climate Change".

Recommendations, all passed by at least 80% of members, included: empowering an independent body to address climate change; Greenhouse gas (GHG) tax, including carbon tax and agricultural GHG tax; encouragement of climate change mitigation, electric vehicles, public transport, forests, organic farming, and natural peat bogs; reduction of food waste; microgeneration of electricity; ending subsidy of peat extraction; increasing bus lanes, cycle lanes and park and ride facilities.

The Oireachtas responded to the report by establishing a Joint Committee on Climate Action, which published its own report on 29 March 2019. On 9 May 2019 the Dáil endorsed the committee's report and symbolically declared a "climate and biodiversity emergency". The motion also requested a Citizen's Assembly to study the biodiversity loss emergency and how the state can improve its response. A "government action plan on climate change" followed on 17 June 2019.

=== Referendums ===
On the weekend of 13–14 January 2018 the Assembly considered the manner in which referendums are held. Recommendations included:

- replacing the ad-hoc Referendum Commission with a permanent Electoral Commission, which would be "obliged to give its view on significant matters of factual or legal dispute that arise during a referendum campaign in the public domain (including on social media)"
- giving equal public money to both sides in referendum campaigns, imposing spending limits for registered parties and advocacy groups, and prohibiting anonymous donations to these groups;
- allowing multiple referendums on the same day, as at present; 41.7% preferred a maximum of two simultaneously
- allowing for preferendums with more than two (yes/no) options; in which case 52% preferred single transferable vote would be used to determine the outcome
- allowing citizens' initiatives for bringing questions either to the Oireachtas or to a referendum

The Assembly considered measures to increase voter turnout. It supported early voting, weekend voting, postal voting, online voting, lowering the voting age to 16, and allowing nonresidents to vote for up to five years after emigrating. It opposed compulsory voting.

=== Fixed-term parliaments ===
The meeting on fixed-term parliaments was scheduled for the weekend of 3–4 March but because of Storm Emma was postponed until 14–15 April. The issue was added to the assembly's remit at the insistence of Shane Ross of the Independent Alliance during negotiations on forming the government. There were eight public submissions, including one from the Green Party in favour of the UK system (embodied in the Fixed-term Parliaments Act 2011).

With 71 members present, the assembly voted 36–35 in favour fixed terms; 39–27 for 4 (rather than 5) years as the term; 63–3 in favour of allowing the term to be "cut short subject to certain conditions".

Whose approval is needed for an early general election: Assembly votes
Approval by	Yes	No	Not stated
Cabinet	39	20	12
Dáil simple majority	29	27	15
Dáil supermajority	40	17	14
President	46	9	16

=== Gender equality ===
In 2019, the Irish government announced two further Citizens' Assemblies including gender equality.

This assembly was tasked with exploring and, within 6 months, making recommendations on; barriers that facilitate gender discrimination towards girls and boys, women and men; removing gender related economic inequalities, reassess the economic value placed traditional 'women's work'; women's full participation in workplace and political; considering the gender imbalance in care; and gender imbalance in low pay sectors.

Former Secretary-General of the European Commission Catherine Day was appointed as chair.

== Assessments ==
In November 2016, David Van Reybrouck commended the Citizens' Assembly and the predecessor Constitutional Convention as models that other European countries could usefully imitate, which could counter the rise of populism. A 2019 editorial in The Irish Times said that the Citizens' Assembly's work on abortion was a "great success" that "paved the way for the resolution of [a] potentially contentious social issue" and "a vital step on the road to generating support for constitutional change".
