= China Misperceived =

- Author: Steven W. Mosher
- Language: English
- Subject: Non-fiction
- Published: 1990
- Publisher: HarperCollins Publishers
- Publication place: United States of America
- Media type: Print
- Pages: 216
- ISBN: 0-465-09805-3

China Misperceived: American Illusions and Chinese Reality is a non-fiction book by the American sinologist and cultural anthropologist Steven W. Mosher.

== Synopsis ==
The book is a historical overview and criticism of the writings that shaped American perceptions of China. Mosher includes American newspaper correspondents, diplomats, and intellectuals such as Edgar Snow, Archibald Steele, Theodore White, and John K. Fairbank. The title plays with the title of Fairbank’s Book from 1974 ″China perceived″.

As the first American anthropologist allowed into China following the inauguration of the 1979 cultural exchange program, Mosher's personal experience with the rural regions of Guangdong grant additional insight. Mosher's book covers the perceptions and misperceptions people have had about China from the travels of Marco Polo. Mosher takes the title "Age of Infatuation" from Harold Isaacs's classic Scratches on Our Minds (1958) to describe the period during the 1930s and 1940s in which Communist China was presented as a progressive force following Edgar Snow's 1938 work, Red Star Over China.

The misperceptions of the West in regard to China have waxed and waned through the belief in the Yellow Peril to the model Maoist Man of Communist China. Mosher alleges self-deception was apparent in U.S. President Richard Nixon's visit to China and the change from hard-line anti-communist to raising toasts in Chairman Mao Zedong's name. Mosher argues that this was the most glaring example of how political expediency, ideology, and propaganda by the Chinese have constantly and consistently blinded Americans to the truth.

== Reviews for China Misperceived ==
"Man can bear very little reality. This simple truth explains both the success of Disneyland with country bumpkins and the success of Maoland with statesmen, journalists, and scholars. How the pursuit of realpolitik can lead straight into the realm of fantasy is an intriguing story that many influential politicians and eminent academics would certainly prefer to forget. It could only be told by a writer who is not afraid of making himself unpopular; Steven Mosher is uniquely qualified for this salubrious task. - Simon Leys, author of The Chairman's New Clothes: Mao and the Cultural Revolution

Few, if any, books have ever dissected America's shifting biases toward China so well. China Misperceived is a disturbing cautionary tale that should be in every foreign correspondent's carry-on luggage - Jay Mathews, former Beijing Bureau Chief of the Washington Post.

The first book-length study of the remarkable series of American misperceptions of communist China, Mosher's work is an important contribution to understanding the political psychology and history of these bizarre blind spots. It helps one to grasp the recurring failure to understand communist systems. - Paul Hollander, author of Political Pilgrims: Travels of Western Intellectuals to the Soviet Union, China, and Cuba, 1828-1978
