= Sercan Temizyürek =

Turkish footballer

Personal information
- Full name: Sercan Temizyürek
- Date of birth: 22 July 1988 (age 38)
- Place of birth: Samsun, Turkey
- Height: 1.75 m (5 ft 9 in)
- Position: Left winger

Youth career
- 2000–2006: Samsunspor

Senior career*
Years	Team	Apps	(Gls)
2006–2011	Samsunspor	68	(7)
2011–2012	Kasımpaşa	0	(0)
2011–2012	→ Ünyespor (loan)	3	(0)
2012	→ Siirtspor (loan)	12	(1)
2012–2013	Eyüpspor	2	(0)

International career
2007	Turkey U19	4	(0)
- * Club domestic league appearances and goals

Sercan Temizyürek (born 22 July 1988) is a Turkish professional former footballer.

== Career ==
Temizyürek began his career with local club Samsunspor in 2000. He participated in the youth ranks until 2006, when he was signed to his first professional contract. In the A2 league, he made 19 appearances and scored three goals. Temizyürek made his league debut in a two nil loss at the hands of Diyarbakırspor on 17 September 2006. He played in a total of 18 league matches that season. The Turkey U-19 team called him up in 2007 for four friendlies, with Temizyürek appearing in all four matches.

The following season, Temizyürek made 14 appearances and was linked with a move to Istanbul-giants Galatasaray. Temizyürek was fined and left out of the squad for a crucial match against Malatyaspor on 22 March 2009 due to disciplinary problems. The club went on to win the match two to nil. He was linked to Boluspor at the end of the 2009–10 season, but instead chose to renew his contract with Samsunspor until May 2012.

On 28 January 2011, Temizyürek was released from his contract with Samsunspor. He signed a 4.5 year contract with Kasımpaşa on 31 January 2011.
