= Family & Life =

- Predecessor: Human Life International (Ireland)
- Formation: 9 September 1996; 28 years ago
- Founders: Peter Scully; David Manly; Eamon O Scolaidhe; Anthony Scully; Maurice Colgan; Michael Hogan; Una Nic Mhathuna
- Type: Pro Life group
- Headquarters: Dublin, Ireland
- Spokesperson: David Manly
- Website: ProLife.ie

Family & Life is an Irish Pro Life organisation founded in 1996.

== Foundation ==
Family & Life were founded out of a split with the Irish branch of Human Life International in September 1996 by David Manly (1996–present), Peter Scully (1996–2001) and three other individuals over alleged interference by its American headquarters. HLI then sought an injunction in the High Court to seize the offices in Family and Life's headquarters. In the end, the case was settled out of court, the offices were kept and a number of directors received an undisclosed sum from Human Life International.

== Work ==
According to its website, Family & Life seeks to establish what it calls a 'Culture of Life'.

The group views itself as supporting projects which promote the sanctity of all human life. Family & Life is also a supporter of the institution of marriage as the basis of family life, upholding a social conservative rather than a social liberal view of society. They say they provide support for pregnant women, although this excludes abortion counselling, and that they help children in vulnerable situations.

Family & Life fundraises direct from supporters in Ireland and the United Kingdom. It says it is not affiliated to any other organisation and does not receive state, organizational or corporate funding or engage in street collections, lotteries or the for-profit sale of goods. It is a non-profit organisation registered in Ireland and the United Kingdom. The organisation focuses on, and develops educational and research approaches to communicate its mission.

In 2013, they took 10 Irish politicians to New York City and Washington, DC, on a Pro Life fact finding missing. These were James Bannon, Terence Flanagan, Peter Mathews, Mattie McGrath, John O’Mahony, Jim Walsh, Paul Bradford, Fidelma Healy Eames, Brian Ó Domhnaill and Paschal Mooney. They also brought Northern politicians Paul Givan, Pat Ramsey and Ian Paisley Jr. Fine Gael TD Jim Daly called for inquiry into this trip.

SIPO ruled that this did not count as a political donation that the politicians had to declare. Family & Life are registered with SIPO to receive donations for political purposes, but they were not required by law to be registered at the time of the trip,

== Alignment ==
Initially, the new organisation, continuing from the stance of HLI, aligned itself with the Youth Defence wing of the Pro Life movement in Ireland. A co-founder of Family & Life, Peter Scully was PRO for Youth Defence in 1992.

However, during the 2002 abortion referendum, it supported the proposals of the Fianna Fáil government against abortion in Ireland. Youth Defence opposed it, claiming that it did not go far enough in protecting the unborn.

== Citizens' Assembly ==
In 2017, they were selected as one of the groups to present to the Citizens' Assembly which is current discussing Ireland's abortion laws. In their presentation, they criticised the presence from British Pregnancy Advisory Service. The chair, Ms Justice Mary Laffoy, defended their inclusion on the grounds that the members of the citizens assembly wanted them included.

== Other campaigns ==
=== Divorce ===
In 1995, there was a referendum on whether to allow divorce. Human Life International (Ireland), along with Family and Life co-founder Peter Scully, campaigned against the legalisation of divorce. It was alleged that they received large amounts of free material and funding from the United States and their US parent organisation Human Life International.

=== Same-sex marriage ===
In 2005 the Irish government held hearings about changing the constitutional definition of the family. Family & Life provided written and oral submissions opposed to any legal recognition of same-sex marriage, calling it an "oxymoron", with founder David Manly claiming it could not exist. The group also highlighted the falling birth rate in Europe.

Dr Tom Finnegan, legal advisor to Family and Life, was advisor to Mothers and Fathers Matter, the main campaign group against the 2015 Irish referendum on same sex marriage. Tom Finnegan was a parliamentary assistant to Senator Rónán Mullen.

== See also ==
- Abortion in the Republic of Ireland
- Youth Defence
- Human Life International
