= Population Research Institute (organization) =

U.S. non-profit organization

- Founder: Paul Marx
- Type: Think tank
- Headquarters: Front Royal, Virginia
- President: Steven W. Mosher
- Chair: John Delmare
- Revenue: $1.48 million (2025)
- Expenses: $1.39 million (2025)
- Website: pop.org

The Population Research Institute (PRI) is a 501(c)(3) non-profit organization based in Front Royal, Virginia, US. The organization opposes abortion and believes that overpopulation is a myth.

== Background ==
The Population Research Institute was founded in 1989 by Paul Marx (1920–2010), a family sociologist, Catholic priest and Benedictine monk who had established the anti-abortion group Human Life International as well. It became an independent institute in 1996. The same year, the think tank got headed by Steven W. Mosher, a social researcher and author who had witnessed forced abortions in China during the implementation of the one-child policy in 1980.

== Activities ==
PRI opposes government attempts to control the population. According to the Los Angeles Times, PRI's Mosher successfully helped lobby the administration of US president George W. Bush to withhold US$34 to $40 million per year for seven years from the United Nations Population Fund (UNFPA), the largest international donor to family planning programs. The research institute opined that UNPFA was using American money to fund Chinese compulsory sterilization and abortions, a claim denied by the population fund, noting that it does not work in areas where the one-child policy is still in force. Mosher also advocated against the Chinese two-child policy, claiming that it was "being pushed to the masses through the Communist Party mechanism".

== Fundraising ==
PRI obtains the vast majority of its funding from charitable contributions, gifts, and grants, with a total revenue of 1.46 million dollars in financial year 2018. Of this, 75.6% was spent on program expenses, 4.9% on administration, and 19.3% on fundraising.

== Criticism ==
PRI's stance on overpopulation and the arguments for "Overpopulation is a Myth" have been described as deceptive.

Charity Navigator classifies charities with respect to "Accountability & Transparency" and "Financial Performance". In 2020 it awarded two out of four stars to PRI for "Accountability & Transparency", and one for "Financial", which combined for an overall score of 70.46, rated as two stars.
