= Paul Connaughton =

Paul Connaughton may refer to:

- Paul Connaughton Snr (born 1944), Irish Fine Gael politician for Galway East from 1981 to 2011
- His son Paul Connaughton Jnr, Irish Fine Gael politician for Galway East since 2011
