= Families in the Oireachtas =

Political families of Ireland

There is a tradition in Irish politics of having family members succeed each other, frequently in the same parliamentary seat. This article lists families where two or more members of that family have been members (TD or Senator) of either of the houses of the Oireachtas (Dáil Éireann and Seanad Éireann) or of the European Parliament. It also includes members of the Oireachtas who had a relation who served in the House of Commons of the United Kingdom of Great Britain and Ireland (1801–1922) for an Irish constituency. It does not include people who have served only on local councils.

For the purposes of this list, a "family" has been defined as a group of people where each person has one of the following relationships to at least one of the other people listed:

- son, daughter, grandson or granddaughter
- father, mother, grandfather or grandmother
- nephew, niece, grandnephew or grandniece
- uncle, aunt, great uncle or great aunt
- sibling or first cousin
- spouse (husband or wife)
- connected by marriage ("-in-law" relationships)

The list has been indexed against the name of the first family member to enter the Oireachtas.

| Party | Abbreviation |
|---|---|
| Conservative Party | Con |
| Cumann na nGaedheal | CnaG |
| Clann na Poblachta | CnaP |
| Clann na Talmhan | CnaT |
| Democratic Left | DL |
| Farmers' Party | FP |
| Fianna Fáil | FF |
| Fine Gael | FG |

| Party | Abbreviation |
|---|---|
| Green Party | GP |
| Independent | Ind |
| Independent Fianna Fáil | IFF |
| Independent Ireland | II |
| Irish National Federation | INF |
| Irish Parliamentary Party | IPP |
| Irish Unionist Alliance | IUA |
| Irish Worker League | IWL |

| Party | Abbreviation |
|---|---|
| Labour Party | Lab |
| National Centre Party | NCP |
| National League Party | NLP |
| Progressive Democrats | PD |
| Social Democrats | SD |
| Sinn Féin | SF |
| Sinn Féin the Workers Party | SFWP |
| Workers' Party | WP |

== A ==
- Theresa Ahearn (1951–2000): FG TD Tipperary South 1989–2000
  - her son Garret Ahearn: FG Senator 2020–
- Bertie Ahern (born 1951): FF TD Dublin Central 1977–2011
  - his brother Noel Ahern (born 1944): FF TD Dublin North-West 1992–2011
- Kit Ahern (1915–2007): FF Senator 1965–1977, FF TD Kerry North 1977–1981
  - her cousin Ned O'Sullivan (born 1950): FF Senator 2007–2025
- William Aird (died 1931): CnaG TD Leix–Offaly 1927–1931
  - his grandson William Aird: FG TD Laois 2024–
- Ernest Alton (1873–1952): Ind TD Dublin University 1922–1937, Ind Senator 1938–1943
  - his nephew Bryan Alton (1919–1991): Ind Senator 1965–1973
- David Andrews (1935–2026): FF TD Dún Laoghaire 1965–2002 (son of Todd Andrews, an FF founder)
  - his son Barry Andrews (born 1967): FF TD Dún Laoghaire 2002–2011, MEP Dublin 2020–
  - his brother Niall Andrews (1937–2006): FF TD Dublin South 1977–1987, MEP Dublin 1984–2004
    - Niall's son Chris Andrews (born 1964): FF TD Dublin South-East 2007–2011, SF TD Dublin Bay South 2020–2024, SF Senator 2025–
- Seán Ardagh (1947–2016): FF TD Dublin South-Central 1997–2011
  - his daughter Catherine Ardagh (born 1982): FF Senator 2016–2024, TD Dublin South-Central 2024–
- Bob Aylward (1911–1974): FF Senator 1973–1974
  - his son Liam Aylward (born 1952): FF TD Carlow–Kilkenny 1977–2007, MEP East 2004–2014
  - his son Bobby Aylward (1955–2022): FF TD Carlow–Kilkenny 2007–2011, 2015–2020

== B ==
- Anthony Barry (1901–1983): FG TD/Senator Cork Borough 1954–1965
  - his son Peter Barry (1928–2016): FG TD Cork City South-East/Cork City/Cork South-Central 1969–1997
    - Peter's daughter Deirdre Clune (born 1959): FG TD Cork South-Central 1997–2002, 2007–2011, Senator 2011–2014, MEP South 2014–2019, 2020–2024
- Richard Barry (1919–2013): FG TD Cork East/Cork North-East 1953–1981
  - his daughter Myra Barry (born 1957): FG TD Cork North-East/Cork East 1979–1987
- Patrick Belton (1884–1945): FF TD Dublin County 1927, CnaG/FG TD Dublin North 1933–1937, FG TD Dublin County 1938–1943
  - his son Richard Belton (1913–1974): FG Senator 1969–1973
    - his daughter Avril Doyle (born 1949): FG TD/Senator Wexford 1982–2002, MEP Leinster/East 1999–2009
  - his son Jack Belton (died 1963): FG TD Dublin North-East 1948–1963
  - his son Paddy Belton (1926–1987): FG TD Dublin North-East 1963–1977
  - his nephew Luke Belton (1918–2006): FG TD/Senator Dublin North-Central/Dublin Finglas 1965–1987
  - his first cousin once removed Louis Belton (1943–2023): FG TD/Senator Longford–Westmeath/Longford–Roscommon 1989–2002
- Thomas Westropp Bennett (1867–1962): CnaG/FG Senator 1922–1936
  - his brother George C. Bennett (1877–1963): CnaG/FG TD Limerick 1927–1948 and Senator 1948–1951
- Sir Edward Coey Bigger (1861–1942): Ind Senator 1925–1936
  - his son Joseph Warwick Bigger (1891–1951): Ind Senator 1944–1951
- Neal Blaney (1889–1948): FF TD Donegal 1927–1937, Donegal East 1937–1938 and 1943–1948, FF Senator 1938–1943
  - Neal's son Neil Blaney (1922–1995): FF/IFF TD Donegal East/Donegal North-East/Donegal 1948–1995, IFF MEP Connacht–Ulster 1979–1984, 1989–1994
  - Neal's son Harry Blaney (1928–2013): IFF TD Donegal North-East 1997–2002
    - Harry's son Niall Blaney (born 1974): IFF/FF TD Donegal North-East 2002–2011, FF Senator 2020–
- Harry Boland (1887–1922): SF TD South Roscommon 1918–1922
  - his brother Gerald Boland (1885–1973): FF TD/Senator Roscommon 1923–1961
    - Gerald's son Kevin Boland (1917–2001): FF TD Dublin County 1957–1970
- John Mary Pius Boland, see O'Byrne
- John Boland (1944–2000): FG Senator 1969–1977, FG TD Dublin County North/Dublin North 1977–1989
  - his daughter Grace Boland: FG TD Dublin Fingal West 2024–
- Philip Brady (1893–1995): FF TD Dublin South-Central 1951–1977
  - his son Gerard Brady (1936–2020): FF TD Dublin Rathmines West/Dublin South-East 1977–1992
- Declan Bree (born 1951): Labour TD Sligo–Leitrim 1992–1997
  - his sister-in-law Catherine Connolly (born 1957): Ind TD Galway West 2016–2025, President 2025–
- Thomas Brennan (1886–1953): FF TD Wicklow 1944–1953
  - his son Paudge Brennan (1922–1998): FF TD Wicklow 1954–1973, 1981–1982, 1982–1987, Senator 1982
- Martin Brennan (1903–1956): FF TD Sligo 1938–1948
  - his nephew Matt Brennan (born 1936): FF TD Sligo–Leitrim 1982–2002
- Séamus Brennan (1948–2008): FF TD Dublin South 1981–2008, Senator 1977–1981
  - his son Shay Brennan: FF TD Dublin Rathdown (2024–)
- Robert Briscoe (1894–1969): FF TD Dublin South/Dublin South-West 1927–1965
  - his son Ben Briscoe (1934–2023): FF TD Dublin 1965–2002
- Colm Brophy (born 1966): FG TD Dublin South-West 2016–
  - his wife Maeve O'Connell: FG TD Dublin Rathdown 2024–
- John Browne (1936–2019): FG Senator 1983–1987, TD Carlow–Kilkenny 1989–2002
  - his son Fergal Browne (born 1973): FG Senator 2002–2007
- Seán Browne (1916–1996): FF TD Wexford 1957–1961, 1969–1981, 1982
  - his nephew John Browne (born 1948): FF TD Wexford 1982–2016
    - John's son James Browne (born 1975): FF TD Wexford 2016–
- Cathal Brugha (1874–1922): SF TD County Waterford 1918–1922
  - his wife Caitlín Brugha (1879–1959): SF TD Waterford 1923–1927
  - his son Ruairí Brugha (1917–2006): FF TD Dublin County South 1973–1977, Senator 1969–1973, 1977–1981, MEP 1977–1979
    - Ruairí's father-in-law Terence MacSwiney (1879–1920): SF TD Cork Mid 1918–1920
      - Terence's sister Mary MacSwiney (1872–1942): SF TD Cork Borough 1921–1927
      - Terence's brother Seán MacSwiney (1878–1942): SF TD Cork Mid, North, South, South East and West 1921–1922
- John Bruton (1947–2024): FG TD Meath 1969–2004
  - his brother Richard Bruton (born 1953): FG Senator 1981–1982, TD Dublin North-Central 1982–2024
- Patrick Burke (1904–1985): FF TD Dublin County/Dublin County North 1944–1973
  - his son Ray Burke (born 1943): FF TD Dublin County North/Dublin North 1973–1997
- James Burke (died 1964): FG TD Roscommon 1951–1964
  - his wife Joan Burke (1928–2016): FG TD Roscommon 1964–1981
- John Butler (1891–1968): Lab TD Waterford–Tipperary East 1922–1923, Waterford 1923–1927, Senator 1938–1965
  - his son Pierce Butler (1922–1999): FG Senator 1969–1983
- Alfie Byrne (1882–1956): IPP MP Dublin Harbour 1915–1918, Ind TD Dublin Mid/Dublin North 1922–1928, Ind Senator 1928–1931, Ind TD Dublin North/Dublin North-East 1932–1956
  - his son A. P. Byrne (1913–1952): Ind TD Dublin North-West 1937–1944, 1948–1952
  - his son Thomas Byrne (1917–1978): Ind TD Dublin North-West 1952–1961
  - his son Patrick Byrne (1925–2021): Ind TD Dublin North-East 1956–1957, FG TD Dublin North-East 1957–1969

== C ==
- Johnny Callanan (1910–1982): FF TD Clare–South Galway/Galway/Galway East 1973–1982
  - his nephew Joe Callanan (1949–2026): FF TD Galway East 2002–2007
- Phelim Calleary (1895–1974): FF TD Mayo North 1952–1969
  - his son Seán Calleary (1931–2018): FF TD Mayo 1973–1992
    - Seán's son Dara Calleary (born 1973): FF TD Mayo 2007–
- Michael Calnan (died 2025): Lab Senator 1993–1997
  - his cousin Michael McCarthy (born 1976): Lab Senator 2002–2011, Lab TD Cork South-West 2011–2016
- Seán Canney (born 1960): Ind TD Galway East 2016–
  - his brother-in-law Paddy McHugh (born 1953): Ind TD Galway East 2002–2007
- Donal Carey (1937–2025): FG TD Clare 1982–2002
  - his son Joe Carey (born 1975): FG TD Clare 2007–2024
- Erskine Childers (1870–1922): SF TD Kildare–Wicklow 1921–1922
  - his double first cousin Robert Childers Barton (1881–1975): SF TD Wicklow West 1919–1921, SF TD Kildare–Wicklow 1921–1923
  - Erskine's son Erskine H. Childers (1905–1974): FF TD Wicklow 1938–1973, President 1973–1974
    - Erskine H.'s daughter Nessa Childers (born 1956): Lab/Ind MEP East 2009–2014, Ind MEP Dublin 2014–2019
- Paddy Clohessy (1908–1971): FF TD Limerick East 1957–1969
  - his nephew Peadar Clohessy (1933–2014): FF/PD TD Limerick East 1981–1982, 1987–1997
- James Coburn (1882–1953): NLP/Ind/FG TD Louth 1927–1953
  - his son George Coburn (1920–2009): FG TD Louth 1953–1961
- James Colbert (1890–1970): Republican/FF TD Limerick 1923–1933
  - his first cousin Michael Colbert (1899–1959): FF TD Limerick/Limerick West 1937–1938, 1944–1948, 1955–1957, FF Senator 1938–1944
- John James Cole (1874–1959): Ind TD Cavan 1923–1927, 1927–1932, 1937–1944
  - his brother Thomas Loftus Cole (1877–1961): Unionist MP Belfast East 1945–1950
  - his son John Copeland Cole (died 1987): Ind Senator 1957–1969
- Harry Colley (1891–1972): FF TD Dublin North-East 1944–1957
  - his son George Colley (1925–1983): FF TD Dublin North-East/Dublin North-Central/Dublin Clontarf/Dublin Central 1961–1983
    - George's daughter Anne Colley (born 1951): PD TD Dublin South 1987–1989
- James Collins (1900–1967): FF TD Limerick 1948–1967
  - his son Gerry Collins (born 1938): FF TD Limerick 1967–1997, MEP Munster 1994–2004
  - his son Michael Collins (1940–2022): FF TD Limerick West 1997–2007
  - his grandson Niall Collins (born 1973): FF TD Limerick West 2007–
- Michael Collins (1890–1922): SF TD Cork South 1918–1921, Cork Mid, North, South, South East and West 1921–1922
  - his cousin Gearóid O'Sullivan (1891–1948): SF TD Carlow–Kilkenny 1921–1923, CnaG TD Dublin County 1927–1937
  - his sister Margaret Collins-O'Driscoll (1876–1945): CnaG TD Dublin North 1923–1933
  - his nephew Seán Collins (1918–1975): FG TD Cork South-West 1948–1957, 1961–1969
  - his grandniece Nora Owen (born 1945): FG TD Dublin North 1981–1987, 1989–2002
  - his grandniece Mary Banotti (1939–2024): FG MEP Dublin 1984–2004
- John Conlan (1928–2004): FG Senator 1965–1969, TD Monaghan/Cavan–Monaghan 1969–1987
  - Seán Conlan (born 1975): FG/Ind TD Cavan–Monaghan 2011–2016
- Paul Connaughton Snr (born 1944): FG Senator 1977–1981, TD Galway East 1981–2011
  - his son Paul Connaughton Jnr (born 1982): FG TD Galway East 2011–2016
- Catherine Connolly, see Bree
- Joseph Connolly (1885–1961): FF Senator 1928–1936
  - his nephew Con Lehane (1912–1983): CnaP TD Dublin South-Central 1948–1951
- Roddy Connolly (1901–1980): Lab TD Louth 1943–1944, 1948–1951, Senator 1975–1977 (Son of James Connolly)
  - his sister Nora Connolly O'Brien (1893–1981): Senator 1957–1969
- Johnny Connor (1899–1955): CnaP TD Kerry North 1954–1955
  - his daughter Kathleen O'Connor (1934–2017): CnaP TD Kerry North 1956–1957
- Fintan Coogan Snr (1910–1984): FG TD Galway West 1954–1977
  - his son Fintan Coogan Jnr (born 1944): FG TD Galway West 1982–1987, Senator 1997–2002
- Cooney, see Mac Eoin
- Richard Corish (1886–1945): Lab TD Wexford 1921–1945
  - his son Brendan Corish (1918–1990): Lab TD Wexford 1945–1982
- W. T. Cosgrave (1880–1965): SF/CnaG/FG TD Carlow–Kilkenny 1919–1927, Cork Borough 1927–1944
  - his brother Philip Cosgrave (1884–1923): SF/CnaG TD Dublin North-West 1921–1923: Dublin South 1923
  - his son Liam Cosgrave (1920–2017): FG TD Dublin County 1943–1948, Dún Laoghaire 1948–1981
    - Liam's son Liam T. Cosgrave (born 1956): FG TD Dún Laoghaire 1981–1987, FG Senator 1989–2002
- Michael Joe Cosgrave (1938–2022): FG TD Dublin Clontarf 1977–1981, Dublin North-East 1981–1992, 1997–2002
  - his daughter Niamh Cosgrave (born 1964): FG Senator 1997
- John A. Costello (1891–1976): FG TD Dublin Townships 1933–1943, 1944–1969
  - his son Declan Costello (1926–2011): FG TD Dublin North-West 1951–1969, Dublin South-West 1973–1977
  - his son-in-law Alexis FitzGerald Snr (1916–1985): FG Senator 1969–1981
    - Alexis Snr's nephew Alexis FitzGerald Jnr (1945–2015): FG Senator 1981–1982, 1982–1987, FG TD Dublin South-East 1982
    - Alexis Jnr's wife Mary Flaherty (born 1953): FG TD Dublin North-West 1981–1997
- Clement Coughlan (1942–1983): FF TD Donegal South-West 1980–1983
  - his brother Cathal Coughlan (1937–1986): FF TD Donegal South-West 1983–1986
    - Cathal's daughter Mary Coughlan (born 1965): FF TD Donegal South-West 1987–2011
- Hugh Coveney (1935–1998): FG TD Cork South-Central 1981–1998
  - his son Simon Coveney (born 1972): FG TD Cork South-Central 1998–2024, MEP South 2004–2007
- Bernard Cowen (1932–1984): FF TD Laois–Offaly 1969–1984
  - his son Brian Cowen (born 1960): FF TD Laois–Offaly 1984–2011
  - his son Barry Cowen (born 1967): FF TD Laois–Offaly 2011–2016, 2020–2024, Offaly 2016–2020, MEP Midlands–North-West 2024–
- Donal Creed (1924–2017): FG TD Cork North-West 1965–1989, MEP 1973–1977
  - his son Michael Creed (born 1963): FG TD Cork North-West 1989–2002, 2007–2024
- Patrick Crotty (1902–1970): FG TD Carlow–Kilkenny 1948–1969
  - his son Kieran Crotty (1930–2022): FG TD Carlow–Kilkenny 1969–1989
- Flor Crowley (1934–1997): FF TD Cork Mid/Cork South-West 1965–1977, 1981–1982, Senator 1977–1981, 1982–1983
  - his son Brian Crowley (1964–2026): FF Senator 1993–1994, MEP Munster/South 1994–2019
- Frederick and Honor Crowley, see O'Byrne
- Cruise O'Brien, see Sheehy
- Cuffe, see Little
- David Cullinane (born 1974): SF Senator 2011–2016, TD Waterford 2016–
  - his ex-wife Kathleen Funchion (born 1981): SF TD Carlow–Kilkenny 2016–2024, MEP South 2024–
- Maurice Cummins (born 1953): FG Senator 2002–2016
  - his son John Cummins (born 1988): FG Senator 2020–2024, TD Waterford 2024–
- Austin Currie (1939–2021): MP (NI) East Tyrone 1964–1972, FG TD Dublin West 1989–2002
  - his daughter Emer Currie (born 1979): FG Senator 2020–2024, FG TD 2024–

== D ==
- Michael D'Arcy (1934–2024): FG TD Wexford 1977–1987, 1989–1992, 1997–2002
  - his son Michael W. D'Arcy (born 1970): FG TD Wexford 2007–2011, 2016–2020, Senator 2011–2016, 2020
- Michael Davern (1900–1973): FF TD Tipperary South 1948–1965
  - his son Don Davern (1935–1968): FF TD Tipperary South 1965–1968
  - his son Noel Davern (1945–2013): FF TD Tipperary South 1969–1981, 1987–2007, MEP Munster 1979–1984
- Michael Davitt (1846–1906): MP County Meath 1882, Anti-Parnellite MP North Meath 1892, Anti-Parnellite MP North East Cork Feb–May 1893, Anti-Parnellite MP South Mayo 1895–1899
  - his son Robert Davitt (1899–1981): CnaG TD Meath 1933–1937
- Dan Desmond (1913–1964): Lab TD Cork South-East, 1948–1964
  - his wife Eileen Desmond (1932–2005): Lab TD Cork South-Central 1965–1987, MEP Munster 1979–1981
- Éamon de Valera (1882–1975): FF TD Clare 1919–1959, President 1959–1973, (also FF MP Parliament of Northern Ireland 1921–1937)
  - his son Vivion de Valera (1910–1982): FF TD Dublin North-West 1944–1981
  - his granddaughter Síle de Valera (born 1954): FF TD Dublin County Mid 1977–1981, Clare 1987–2007, MEP Dublin 1979–1984
  - his grandson Éamon Ó Cuív (born 1950): FF Senator 1989–1992, FF TD Galway West 1992–2024
- Austin Deasy (1936–2017): FG TD Waterford 1977–2002
  - his son John Deasy (born 1967): FG TD Waterford 2002–2020
- Noel Dempsey (born 1953): FF TD Meath/Meath West 1987–2011
  - his daughter Aisling Dempsey: FF TD Meath West 2024–
- James Devins (1873–1922): SF TD Sligo–Mayo East 1921–1922
  - his grandson Jimmy Devins (born 1948): FF TD Sligo–North Leitrim 2002–2011
- John Dillon (1851–1927): IPP MP East Mayo 1880–1918
  - his son James Dillon (1902–1986): NCP TD Donegal 1932–1937, FG TD Monaghan 1937–1969
- John Dinneen (1867–1942): FP TD Cork East 1922–1927
  - his nephew Liam Ahern (1916–1974): FF Senator 1957–1973, FF TD Cork North-East 1973–1974
    - Liam's son Michael Ahern (born 1949): FF TD Cork East 1982–2011
- Sir Maurice Dockrell (1850–1929): IUA MP Dublin Rathmines 1918–1922
  - Maurice's son Henry Morgan Dockrell (1880–1955): FG TD Dublin County 1932–1948
    - Henry's son Maurice E. Dockrell (1908–1986): FG TD Dublin South/Dublin South-Central/Dublin Central 1943–1977
    - Henry's son Percy Dockrell (1914–1979): FG TD Dún Laoghaire 1951–1957, 1961–1977
- Charles Dolan (1881–1963): IPP MP North Leitrim 1906–1908
  - his brother James Dolan (1884–1955): SF/CnaG TD Leitrim 1918–1921, Leitrim–Roscommon North 1921–1923, Leitrim–Sligo 1923–1932, 1933–1937
- Michael Donnellan (1900–1964): CnaT TD Galway 1938–1964
  - his son John Donnellan (born 1937): FG TD Galway 1964–1989
- James G. Douglas (1887–1954): Ind Senator 1922–1943, 1944–1954
  - his son John Douglas (1912–1982): Ind Senator 1954–1957
- James Charles Dowdall (1873–1939): Ind/FF Senator 1922–1936
  - his wife Jane Dowdall (1899–1974): FF Senator 1951–1961
  - his brother Thomas Dowdall (1872–1942): FF TD Cork Borough 1932–1942

== E ==
- Tom Enright (born 1940): FG TD Laois–Offaly 1969–1992, 1997–2002, FG Senator 1993–1997
  - his daughter Olwyn Enright (born 1974): FG TD Laois–Offaly 2002–2011
    - her husband Joe McHugh (born 1971): FG Senator 2002–2007, FG TD Donegal North-East/Donegal 2007–2024
- Esmonde, see Grattan
- James Everett (1890–1967): Lab TD Wicklow 1923–1967
  - his nephew Liam Kavanagh (1935–2021): Lab TD Wicklow 1969–1997, MEP Leinster 1973–1981

== F ==
- Thomas Finlay (1893–1932): CnaG TD Dublin County 1930–1932
  - his son Thomas Finlay (1922–2017): FG TD Dublin South-Central 1954–1957
    - his grandson James Geoghegan (born 1985/1986): FG TD Dublin Bay South 2024–
- Desmond FitzGerald (1888–1947): CnaG TD 1919–1937, Senator 1938–1943
  - his son Garret FitzGerald (1926–2011): FG Senator 1965–1969, FG TD Dublin South-East 1969–1992
    - Garret's daughter-in-law Eithne FitzGerald (born 1950): Lab TD Dublin South 1992–1997
- Dermot Fitzpatrick (1940–2022): FF TD Dublin Central 1987–1992, 2002–2007; FF Senator 1997–2002
  - his daughter Mary Fitzpatrick (born 1969): FF Senator 2020–
- Oliver J. Flanagan (1920–1987): FG TD Laois–Offaly 1943–1987
  - his son Charles Flanagan (born 1956): FG TD Laois–Offaly 1987–2002, 2007–2024
- Pádraig Flynn (born 1939): FF TD Mayo West 1977–1993
  - his daughter Beverley Flynn (born 1966): FF/Ind TD Mayo 1997–2011
- Denis Foley (1934–2013): FF/Ind TD Kerry North 1981–1987, 1992–2002
  - his daughter Norma Foley (born 1970): FF TD Kerry 2020–
- Johnny Fox (1948–1995): Ind TD Wicklow 1992–1995
  - his daughter Mildred Fox (born 1971): Ind TD Wicklow 1995–2007
- Seán French (1889–1937): FF TD Cork Borough 1927–1932
  - his son Seán French (1931–2011): FF TD Cork Borough/Cork City North-West/Cork City/Cork North-Central 1967–1982
- Funchion, see Cullinane

== G ==
- John Galvin (1907–1963): FF TD Cork Borough 1956–1963
  - his wife Sheila Galvin (1914–1983): FF TD Cork Borough 1964–1965
- Johnny Geoghegan (1913–1975): FF TD Galway West 1954–1975
  - his daughter Máire Geoghegan-Quinn (born 1950): FF TD Galway West 1975–1997
- James Geoghegan, see Finlay
- Seán Gibbons (1883–1952): CnaG TD Carlow–Kilkenny 1923–1924, FF TD Carlow–Kilkenny 1932–1937, FF Senator 1938–1951
  - his nephew Jim Gibbons (1924–1997): FF TD Carlow–Kilkenny 1957–1981, 1982, MEP 1973–1977
    - Jim's son Martin Gibbons (born 1953): PD TD Carlow–Kilkenny 1987–1989
    - Jim's son Jim Gibbons Jnr (born 1954): PD Senator 1997–2002
- T. P. Gill (1858–1931): IPP/INF MP South Louth 1885–1892
  - his nephew Tomás Mac Giolla (1924–2010): WP TD Dublin West 1982–1992
- James Grattan (died 1766) MP Dublin City 1761–1766
  - his son Henry Grattan (1746–1820) Irish Patriot Party MP Charlemont 1775–1790, Dublin City 1790–1797, Dublin City 1806–1820
    - his son Henry Grattan (1789–1859) Whig MP Dublin City 1826–1830, Repeal Association MP County Meath 1831–1852
      - his son-in-law Sir John Esmonde (1826–1876) Liberal MP County Waterford 1852–1876
        - his uncle Sir Thomas Esmonde (1786–1868) Whig MP Wexford 1841–1847
        - Sir John's son Sir Thomas Esmonde (1862–1935): IPP MP 1885–1918, Ind Senator 1922–1934
          - Sir Thomas's cousin John Joseph Esmonde (1862–1915): IPP MP North Tipperary 1910–1915
          - Sir Thomas's son Sir Osmond Esmonde (1896–1936): CnaG TD Wexford 1923–1936
            - John Joseph's son Sir John Lymbrick Esmonde (1893–1958): FG TD Wexford 1937–1951
            - Sir John Lymbrick's brother Sir Anthony Esmonde (1899–1981): FG TD Wexford 1951–1973
              - Sir Anthony's son Sir John Grattan Esmonde (1928–1987): FG TD Wexford 1973–1977
- Patrick Guiney (1867–1913): All-for-Ireland League MP North Cork 1910–1913
  - his brother John Guiney (1868–1931): All-for-Ireland League MP North Cork 1913–1918
    - their nephew Philip Burton (1908–1995): Fine Gael TD Cork North-East 1961–1969, Senator 1973–1977
- Richard Samuel Guinness (1797–1857) Irish Conservative Party MP Kinsale 1847–1848
  - his cousin Sir Benjamin Guinness (1798–1868): Con MP Dublin City 1865–1868
    - his son Sir Arthur Guinness (1840–1915): Con MP Dublin City 1868–1870, 1874–1880
      - his great-nephew Henry Guinness (1858–1945): Ind Senator 1922–1934
        - Henry's nephew Henry Eustace Guinness (1897–1972): Ind Senator 1954–1957
      - Henry's cousin Benjamin Guinness (1937–1992): FG Senator 1973–1977

== H ==
- Seán Hales (1880–1922): SF TD Cork Mid, North, South, South East and West 1921–1922
  - his brother Tom Hales (1892–1966): FF TD Cork West 1933–1937
- Des Hanafin (1930–2017): FF Senator 1965–1993, 1997–2002
  - his daughter Mary Hanafin (born 1959): FF TD Dún Laoghaire 1997–2011
  - his son John Hanafin (born 1960): FF Senator 2002–2011
- Paddy Harte (1931–2018): FG TD Donegal North-East/Donegal 1961–1997
  - Jimmy Harte (born 1958): Lab Senator 2011–2015
- Haughey, see Lemass
- Healy, see Sullivan
- Jackie Healy-Rae (1931–2014): Ind TD Kerry South 1997–2011
  - his son Michael Healy-Rae (born 1967): Ind TD Kerry South 2011–2016, Kerry 2016–
  - his son Danny Healy-Rae (born 1954): Ind TD Kerry 2016–
- Michael Herbert (1925–2006): FF TD 1969–1981, MEP 1973–1979
  - his brother Tony Herbert (1920–2014): FF Senator 1977–1981, 1982–1983
- Sir William Hickie (1865–1950): Senator 1925–1936
  - his grandnephew Maurice O'Connell (1936–2016): FG Senator 1981–1983
- Michael D. Higgins (born 1941): Lab Senator 1973–1977, 1983–1987; Lab TD Galway West 1981–1982, 1987–2011; President 2011–2025
  - his daughter Alice-Mary Higgins (born 1975): Ind Senator 2016–
- Patrick Hillery (1923–2008) FF TD Clare (1951–1973); President 1976–1990
  - his first cousin Brian Hillery (1937–2021) FF Senator 1977–1982, 1983–1987, 1992–1994; FF TD Dún Laoghaire 1987–1992
  - his grandson-in-law Michael McNamara (born 1974): Lab TD Clare 2011–2016, Ind TD Clare 2020–2024, MEP South 2024–
- Michael Hilliard (1903–1982): FF TD Meath–Westmeath 1943–1948, Meath 1948–1973, MEP 1973
  - his son Colm Hilliard (1936–2002): FF TD Meath 1982–1997
- Hogan, see Sullivan
- T. V. Honan (1878–1954): FF Senator 1934–1936, 1938–1954
  - his son Dermot Honan (died 1986): FF Senator 1965–1973
    - Dermot's wife Tras Honan (1930–2023): FF Senator 1977–1992
      - Tras's sister Carrie Acheson (1934–2023): FF TD Tipperary South 1981–Feb. 1982
- John Hooper (1876–1955): IPP MP South East Cork 1885–1889
  - his son Patrick Hooper (1873–1931): Ind Senator 1927–1931
- John Horgan (1846–1897): NLP TD Cork Borough 1927
  - his grandson Seán O'Leary (1941–2006): FG Senator 1981–1982, 1983–1987
- Ralph Howard (1877–1946): Ind Senator 1922–1928
  - his daughter-in-law Eleanor Howard (1914–1997): Lab Senator 1948–1951

== K ==
- William Kenneally (1899–1964): FF TD Waterford 1952–1961
  - his son Billy Kenneally (1925–2009): FF TD Waterford 1965–1982, Senator 1982–1983
    - his grandson Brendan Kenneally (born 1955): FF TD Waterford 1989–2002, 2007–2011, Senator 2002–2007
- Paddy Keaveney (1929–1995): IFF TD Donegal North-East 1976–1977
  - his daughter Cecilia Keaveney (born 1968): FF TD Donegal North-East 1996–2007, FF Senator 2007–2011
- Thomas Kennedy (died 1947): Lab Senator 1934–1936, 1943–1947
  - his son Fintan Kennedy (died 1984): Lab Senator 1969–1981
- Henry Kenny (1913–1975): FG TD Mayo South 1954–1969, Mayo West 1969–1975
  - his son Enda Kenny (born 1951): FG TD Mayo West 1975–1997, Mayo 1997–2020
- David Kent (1867–1930): SF TD Cork East/Cork East and North East 1918–1927
  - his brother William Kent (1873–1956): FF TD Cork East 1927–1932, NCP/FG TD Cork East 1933–1937
- Michael Keyes (1886–1959): Lab TD Limerick East 1927, 1933–1957
  - his grandnephew Brian Leddin (born 1979/1980) GP TD Limerick City 2020–2024
- Mark Killilea Snr (1897–1970): FF TD Galway/Galway East/Galway North 1927–1932, 1933–1961, FF Senator 1961–1969
  - his son Mark Killilea Jnr (1939–2018): FF TD 1977–1982, FF Senator 1969–1977, 1982–1987, MEP 1987–1999
- Michael F. Kitt (1914–1974): FF TD 1948–1951, 1957–1974
  - Michael F.'s son Michael P. Kitt (born 1950): FF TD Galway North-East 1973–1977, Galway East 1981–2002, 2007–2016, FF Senator 1977–1981, 2002–2007
  - Michael F.'s son Tom Kitt (born 1952): FF TD 1987–2011
  - Michael F.'s daughter Áine Brady (born 1954): FF TD Kildare North 2007–2011
    - her husband Gerry Brady (born 1948): FF TD Kildare 1982

== L ==
- James Larkin (1874–1947): IWL TD Dublin North 1927, Ind TD Dublin North-East 1937–1938, Lab TD Dublin North-East 1943–1944
  - James Snr's son James Larkin Jnr (1904–1969): Lab TD Dublin South 1943–1948, Dublin South-Central 1948–1954
  - James Snr's son Denis Larkin (1908–1987): Lab TD Dublin North-East 1954–1961, 1965–1969
- Hugh Law (1818–1883): Liberal MP Londonderry 1874–1881
  - his son Hugh Law (1872–1943): IPP MP West Donegal 1902–1918, CnaG TD Donegal 1927–1932
- Patsy Lawlor (1933–1997): FG Senator 1981–1983
  - her son Anthony Lawlor (born 1959): FG TD Kildare North 2011–2016, Senator 2018–2020
- Seán Lemass (1899–1971): FF TD Dublin 1924–1969
  - his son Noel Lemass (1929–1976): FF TD Dublin South-West 1956–1976
    - Noel's wife Eileen Lemass (born 1932): FF TD Dublin South-West 1977–1987, MEP Dublin 1984–1989
  - Seán's son-in-law Charles Haughey (1925–2006): FF TD Dublin North-East/Dublin Artane/Dublin North-Central 1957–1992
    - Charles' son Seán Haughey (born 1961): FF Senator 1987–1992, FF TD Dublin North-Central 1992–2011, Dublin Bay North 2016–2024
  - Seán's grandson Seán O'Connor (born 1960): FF Senator 1982
- Brian Lenihan Snr (1930–1995): FF Senator 1957–1961, 1973–1977, FF TD Roscommon 1961–1969, Roscommon–Leitrim 1969–1973, Dublin West 1977–1995, MEP 1973–1977
  - Brian Snr's father Patrick Lenihan (1902–1970): FF TD Longford–Westmeath 1965–1970
  - Brian Snr's sister Mary O'Rourke (1937–2024): FF Senator 1981–1982, 2002–2007, FF TD Longford–Westmeath 1982–1997, 2007–2011, Westmeath 1997–2002
  - Brian Snr's son Brian Lenihan Jnr (1959–2011): FF Dublin West 1996–2011
  - Brian Snr's son Conor Lenihan (born 1963): FF TD Dublin South-West 1997–2011
- Jimmy Leonard (1927–2022): FF TD Cavan–Monaghan 1973–1981, Feb 1982–1997, Senator 1981–1982
  - his daughter Ann Leonard (born 1969): FF Senator 1997–2002
- Patrick Little (1884–1963): FF TD Waterford 1927–1954
  - his grandnephew Ciarán Cuffe (born 1963): GP TD Dún Laoghaire 2002–2011, MEP Dublin 2019–2024
- James B. Lynch (died 1954): FF TD Dublin South 1932–1948 Senator 1951–1954
  - his wife Celia Lynch (1908–1989): FF TD Dublin South-Central, Dublin North-Central 1954–1977
- Kathleen Lynch (born 1953): DL/Lab TD Cork North-Central 1994–1997, 2002–2016
  - her brother-in-law Ciarán Lynch (born 1964): Lab TD Cork South-Central 2007–2016

== M ==
- Mary McAleese (born 1951): President of Ireland 1997–2011
  - her husband Martin McAleese (born 1951): Ind Senator 2011–2013
- Timothy McAuliffe (1909–1985): Lab Senator 1961–1969, 1973–1983
  - his daughter Helena McAuliffe-Ennis (born 1951): Lab (then PD) Senator 1983–1987
- Joseph MacBride (1860–1938): SF TD Mayo West 1919–1921, Mayo North and West 1921–1923, CnaG TD Mayo South 1923–1927
  - his nephew Seán MacBride (1904–1988): CnaP TD Dublin County 1947–1948, Dublin South-West 1948–1957
- Tom McEllistrim (1894–1973): FF TD Kerry/Kerry North 1923–1969
  - his son Tom McEllistrim (1926–2000): FF TD Kerry North 1969–1987, Senator 1987–1989, 1989–1992
    - his grandson Tom McEllistrim (born 1968): FF TD Kerry North 2002–2011
- MacEntee, see Sheehy
- Shane McEntee (1956–2012): FG TD Meath 2005–2007, Meath East 2007–2012
  - his daughter Helen McEntee (born 1986): FG TD Meath East 2013–
- Seán Mac Eoin (1893–1973): SF TD Longford-Westmeath 1921–1923, CnaG TD Leitrim-Sligo 1929–1932, FG TD Longford-Westmeath/Athlone-Longford 1932–1965
  - his nephew-in-law Patrick Cooney (1931–2025): FG TD Longford-Westmeath 1970–1977, 1981–1989, Senator 1977–1981, MEP Leinster 1989–1994
- Nicky McFadden (1962–2014): FG Senator 2007–2011, TD Longford–Westmeath 2011–2014
  - her sister Gabrielle McFadden (born 1967): FG TD Longford–Westmeath 2014–2016, Senator 2016–2020
- Brendan McGahon (1936–2017): FG TD Louth 1982–2002
  - his nephew John McGahon (born 1990): FG Senator 2020–2025
- Patrick McGilligan (1847–1917): INF MP South Fermanagh 1892–1895
  - his son Patrick McGilligan (1889–1979): CnaG/FG TD NUI/Dublin North-West 1923–1965
- Gerrard McGowan (died 1971): Lab TD Dublin County 1937–1938
  - his nephew Jim Glennon (born 1953): FF Senator 2000–2002, TD Dublin North 2002–2007
- Joseph McGrath (1888–1966): CnaG TD Dublin (St. James's)/Dublin North-West/Mayo North 1919–1927
  - his son Patrick McGrath (1927–2001): Ind Senator 1973–1977
- Michael McGrath (born 1976): FF TD Cork South-Central 2007–2024
  - his brother Séamus McGrath: FF TD Cork South-Central 2024–
- James McGuire (1903–1989): CnaG TD Dublin South 1933–1937
  - his brother Edward McGuire (1901–1992): Ind Senator 1948–1965
- McHugh see Canney and Enright
- Joseph McLoughlin (1916–1991): FG TD Sligo–Leitrim 1969–1977
  - his nephew Tony McLoughlin (born 1949): FG TD Sligo–North Leitrim 2011–2020
- Eoin MacNeill (1867–1945): SF/CnaG TD National University of Ireland 1919–1927
  - his brother James McNeill (1869–1938); 2nd Governor-General of the Irish Free State 1928–1932
    - his son-in-law Michael Tierney (1894–1975): CnaG TD Mayo North 1925–1927, NUI 1927–1932, Senator 1938–1944
    - his grandson Michael McDowell (born 1951): PD TD Dublin South-East 1987–1989, 1992–1997, 2002–2007; Ind Senator 2016–
      - Michael McDowell's grandfather-in-law Joseph Brennan (1889–1950): Ind Senator 1938–1944, 1948–1950
- John McKean (1869–1942): MP for South Monaghan 1902–1918
  - his brother James J. MacKean: Senator 1922–1936
- Ray MacSharry (born 1938): FF TD Sligo–Leitrim 1969–1988, MEP Connacht–Ulster 1984–1989
  - his son Marc MacSharry (born 1973): FF Senator 2002–2016, TD Sligo–Leitrim 2016–2024
- MacSwiney see Brugha
- Seán Maloney (born 1945): Lab Senator 1993–1997
  - his brother Eamonn Maloney (born 1953): Lab/Ind TD Dublin South-West 2011–2016
- Tadhg Manley (1893–1976): FG TD Cork South 1954–1961
  - his nephew Liam Burke (1928–2005): FG TD Cork City 1969–1977, 1979–1981, TD Cork North-Central 1981–1989, 1992–2002
- John Mannion Snr (1907–1978): FG TD Galway West 1951–1954, Senator 1954–1957, 1961–1969
  - his son John Mannion Jnr (1944–2006): FG TD Galway West 1977–1981, Senator 1969–1977, 1981–1983
- Catherine Martin (born 1972): GP TD Dublin Rathdown 2016–2024
  - her husband Francis Noel Duffy (born 1971): GP TD Dublin South-West 2020–2024
  - her brother Vincent P. Martin (born 1968): GP Senator 2020–2025
- Con Meaney (1890–1970): FF TD Cork North 1937–1943, Cork Mid 1961–1965
  - his son Thomas Meaney (1931–2022): FF TD Cork Mid/Cork North-West 1961–1982
- Liam Mellows (1892–1922): SF TD Galway East, Meath North 1918–1922, Galway 1921–1922
  - his brother Barney Mellows (1896–1942): SF TD Galway 1923–1927
- Matthew Minch (1857–1921): INF/IPP MP South Kildare 1892–1903
  - his son Sydney Minch (1893–1970): CnaG TD Kildare 1932–1937, Carlow–Kildare 1937–1938
- Jim Mitchell (1946–2002): FG TD Dublin Ballyfermot/Dublin West/Dublin Central 1977–2002
  - his brother Gay Mitchell (born 1951): FG TD Dublin South-Central 1981–2007, MEP Dublin 2004–2014
- Joe Mooney (1916–1988): FF Senator 1961–1965
  - his son Paschal Mooney (born 1947): FF Senator 1987–2007, 2010–2016
- Donal Moynihan (1941–2022): FF TD Cork North-West 1982–1989, 1992–2007
  - his son Aindrias Moynihan (born 1967): FF TD Cork North-West 2016–
- Michael Moynihan (1917–2001): Lab TD Kerry South 1981–1992
  - his daughter Breeda Moynihan-Cronin (born 1953): Lab TD Kerry South 1992–2007
- Eugene Mullen (1898–1953): FF TD Mayo South June–Sept 1927
  - his brother Thomas Mullen (1896–1966): FF TD Dublin County 1938–1943
- Rónán Mullen (born 1970): Ind Senator 2007–
  - his first cousin Michael Mullins (born 1953): FG Senator 2011–2016
- Michael Pat Murphy (1919–2000): Lab TD Cork South-West 1951–1981
  - his son-in-law John O'Donoghue (born 1956): FF TD Kerry South 1987–2011
- Timothy J. Murphy (1893–1949): Lab TD Cork West 1923–1949
  - his son William J. Murphy (1928–2018): Lab TD Cork West 1949–1951

== N ==
- Liam Naughten (1944–1996): FG Senator 1981–1982, 1989–1996, FG TD Roscommon 1982–1989
  - his son Denis Naughten (born 1973): FG Senator 1997, FG TD Longford–Roscommon 1997–2007, Roscommon–South Leitrim 2007–2016, Ind TD Roscommon–Galway 2016–2024
- Dan Neville (born 1946): FG Senator 1989–1997, FG TD Limerick West 1997–2011, Limerick 2011–2016
  - his son Tom Neville (born 1975): FG TD Limerick County 2016–2020
- Tom Nolan (1921–1992): FF TD Carlow–Kilkenny 1965–1982, MEP 1973–1979
  - his son M. J. Nolan (born 1951): FF TD Carlow–Kilkenny 1982–2011
- William Norton: (1900–1963): Lab TD Dublin County 1923–1927, Kildare/Carlow–Kildare/Kildare 1932–1963
  - his son Patrick Norton (born 1928): Lab TD Kildare 1965–1969, Senator 1969–1973

== O ==
- Mary Ann O'Brien (born 1960): Ind Senator 2011–2016
  - her first cousin-in-law John Magnier (born 1948): Ind Senator 1987–1989
- Patrick O'Byrne (1870–1944): SF TD 1921–1922
  - his brother-in-law John Mary Pius Boland (1870–1958): IPP MP South Kerry 1900–1918
    - John's daughter Honor Crowley (1903–1966): FF TD Kerry South 1945–1966
    - Honor's husband Frederick Crowley (1880–1945): FF TD Kerry South 1927–1945
- Richard O'Connell (1892–1964): CnaG TD Limerick 1923–1932
  - his nephew Tom O'Donnell (1926–2020): FG TD Limerick East 1961–1987, MEP Munster 1979–1989
    - Tom's nephew Kieran O'Donnell (born 1963): FG TD Limerick East/Limerick City 2007–2016, 2020–, Senator 2016–2020
- O'Connor, see Connor
- Noel O'Flynn (born 1951): FF TD Cork North-Central 1997–2011
  - his son Ken O'Flynn: II TD Cork North-Central 2024–
- O'Higgins, see Sullivan
- Ned O'Keeffe (born 1942): FF TD Cork East 1982–2011
  - his son Kevin O'Keeffe (born 1964): FF TD Cork East 2016–2020
- Pierce Mahony (1792–1853): Repeal MP Kinsale 1837
  - his grandson Pierce O'Mahony (1850–1930): IPP MP North Meath 1886–1892
    - his son Dermot O'Mahony (1881–1960): CnaG TD Wicklow 1927–1938
- Donogh O'Malley (1921–1968): FF TD Limerick East 1954–1968
  - his nephew (Note: Denis O'Malley (grandfather of Patrick and Tim) was the brother of Joseph O'Malley (father of Donogh and grandfather of Desmond).) Desmond O'Malley (1939–2021): FF/PD TD Limerick East 1968–2002
    - Desmond's daughter Fiona O'Malley (born 1968): PD TD Dún Laoghaire 2002–2007, Senator 2007–2011
  - Donogh's first cousin's son Patrick O'Malley (1943–2021): PD TD Dublin West 1987–1989
  - Patrick's first cousin Tim O'Malley (born 1944): PD TD Limerick East 2002–2007
- John Ormonde (1905–1981): FF TD Waterford 1947–1965, Senator 1965–1969
  - his son Donal Ormonde (born 1943): FF TD Waterford 1982–1987, Senator 1989–1993
- Christy O'Sullivan (born 1948): FF TD Cork South-West 2007–2011
  - his son Christopher O'Sullivan (born 1982): FF TD Cork South-West 2020–
- John M. O'Sullivan (1891–1948): FG TD Kerry/Kerry North 1923–1943
  - his brother Timothy O'Sullivan (1879–1950): IPP MP East Kerry 1910–1918
  - their cousin Eugene O'Sullivan (1879–1942): IPP MP East Kerry 1910
- Timothy O'Sullivan (1899–1971): FF TD Cork West 1937–1954, Senator 1957–1959
  - his niece Peggy Farrell (1920–2003): FF Senator 1969–1973

== P ==
- James Pattison (1886–1963): Lab TD Carlow–Kilkenny 1933–1957
  - his son Séamus Pattison (1936–2018): Lab TD Carlow–Kilkenny 1961–2007, MEP Leinster 1981–1984
- Margaret Pearse (1857–1932): SF TD Dublin County 1921–1922 (mother of Patrick Pearse)
  - her daughter Margaret Mary Pearse (1878–1968): FF TD Dublin County 1932–1937, Senator 1938–1968
- Paddy Power (1928–2013): FF TD Kildare 1969–1989, MEP 1977–1979
  - his son Seán Power (born 1960): FF TD Kildare/Kildare South 1989–2011
- Patrick Power (1850–1913): IPP/INF MP County Waterford 1884–1895, East Waterford 1895–1913
  - his nephew Pierce McCan (1882–1919): SF MP/TD Tipperary East 1918–1919

== Q ==
- Ruairi Quinn (born 1946): Lab TD/Senator Dublin South-East 1977–1981, 1982–2016
  - his first cousin Feargal Quinn (1936–2019): Ind Senator 1993–2016

== R ==
- Michael Reddy (died 1919): IPP MP Birr 1900–1918
  - his grandnephew Anthony Millar (1934–1993): FF TD Galway South and Galway East 1958–1969
    - Millar's uncle Patrick Beegan (1895–1958): FF TD Galway constituencies 1932–1958
- John Edward Redmond (1806–1865): Lib MP City of Wexford 1859–1865
  - his nephew William Archer Redmond (1825–1880): IPP MP Wexford 1872–1880
    - William's son Willie Redmond (1861–1917): IPP MP Wexford 1883–1885, Fermanagh North 1885–1892, Clare East 1892–1917
    - William's son John Redmond (1856–1918): IPP MP New Ross 1881–1885, North Wexford 1885–1891, Waterford City 1891–1918
      - John's son William Redmond (1886–1932): IPP/NLP/CnaG TD Waterford 1918–1932
        - William's wife Bridget Redmond (1904–1952): CnaG/FG TD Waterford 1933–1952
- Patrick Reynolds (1887–1932): CnaG TD Leitrim–Sligo 1927–1932
  - his wife Mary Reynolds (1889–1974): FG TD Leitrim–Sligo 1932–1961
    - Their son Patrick J. Reynolds (1920–2003): FG TD Roscommon 1961–1969, Roscommon–Leitrim 1973–1977, Senator 1969–1973, 1977–1987
      - Patrick J.'s son Gerry Reynolds (born 1961): FG TD Sligo–Leitrim 1989–1992 and 1997–2002, Senator 1987–1989 and 1993–1997
- Eamon Rice (1873–1937): FF TD Monaghan 1932–1937
  - his wife Bridget Rice (1885–1967): FF TD Monaghan 1938–1954
- Martin Roddy (1883–1948): CnaG/FG TD Leitrim–Sligo 1925–1938, 1943–1948
  - his brother Joseph Roddy (1897–1965): FG TD Sligo–Leitrim 1948–1957, Senator 1957–1961
- John N. Ross (1920–2011): Ind Senator 1961–1965
  - his son Shane Ross (born 1949): Ind Senator 1981–2011, Ind TD Dublin South 2011–2020
- James Ryan (1892–1970): SF TD 1918–1922, Republican TD 1923–1926, FF TD 1926–1965
  - his son Eoin Ryan Snr (1920–2001): FF Senator 1957–1987
    - his grandson Eoin Ryan Jnr (born 1953): FF Senator, TD Dublin South-East 1992–2007, MEP Dublin 2004–2009
  - his brother-in-law Seán T. O'Kelly (1882–1966): SF/Republican TD 1918–1932, President 1945–1959
  - his brother-in-law Richard Mulcahy (1886–1971): SF/CnaG/FG TD and Senator 1918–1961
  - his brother-in-law Denis McCullough (1883–1968): CnaG TD 1924–1927
- Patrick Ryan (1898–1944): Republican TD Tipperary 1923–1927
  - his brother Martin Ryan (1900–1943): FF TD Tipperary 1933–1943
  - Martin's wife Mary Ryan (1898–1981): FF TD Tipperary 1944–1961
- Seán Ryan (born 1943): Lab TD Dublin North 1989–1997, 1998–2007
  - his brother Brendan Ryan (born 1953): Lab Senator 2007–2011, TD Dublin North 2011–2020

== S ==
- David Sheehy (1844–1932): IPP MP South Galway 1885–1900, South Meath 1903–1918
  - his son-in-law Tom Kettle (1880–1916): IPP MP East Tyrone 1906–1910
  - his grandson Owen Sheehy-Skeffington (1909–1970): Ind Senator 1954–1957, 1965–1970
  - his grandson Conor Cruise O'Brien (1917–2008): Lab TD Dublin North-East 1969–1977, Senator 1977–1979, MEP 1973
    - O'Brien's father-in-law Seán MacEntee (1889–1984): SF TD Monaghan 1919–1922, FF TD Dublin County/Townships/South East 1927–1969
- Joe Sherlock (1930–2007): SFWP TD Cork East 1981–1982, WP TD 1987–1992, Lab TD 2002–2007, Senator 1993–1997
  - his son Seán Sherlock (born 1972): Lab TD Cork East 2007–2024
  - his niece Marie Sherlock: Lab Senator 2020–2024, TD Dublin Central 2024–
- Patrick Smith (1901–1982): SF TD Cavan 1923–1927, FF TD Cavan 1927–1977
  - his grandniece Niamh Smyth (born 1978): FF TD Cavan–Monaghan 2016–
- Dan Spring (1910–1988): Lab TD Kerry North 1943–1981
  - his son Dick Spring (born 1950): Lab TD Kerry North 1981–2002
    - Dick's nephew Arthur Spring (born 1976): Lab TD Kerry North–West Limerick 2011–2016
- Timothy Sullivan (1827–1914): Home Rule/IPP MP County Westmeath 1880–1885, Dublin College Green 1885–1892, West Donegal 1892–1900
  - his brother Alexander Sullivan (1829–1884): Lib/IPP MP County Louth 1874–1880, County Meath 1880–1882
  - his nephew Tim Healy (1855–1931): IPP MP Wexford 1880–1883, County Monaghan 1883–1885, South Londonderry 1885–1886, North Longford 1886–1892, North Louth 1892–1910 (1st Governor-General of the Irish Free State 1922–1928)
    - Tim Healy's brother Thomas Joseph Healy (1854–1925): IPP MP North Wexford 1892–1900
    - Tim Healy's brother Maurice Healy (1859–1923): IPP MP Cork City 1885–1900 and 1909–1910, North East Cork 1910–1918
  - Timothy Sullivan's grandson Kevin O'Higgins (1892–1927): CnaG TD Laois–Offaly 1918–1927
    - Kevin's brother Thomas F. O'Higgins (1890–1953): CnaG/FG TD Dublin, Laois–Offaly, Cork 1929–1953
      - Thomas's son Tom O'Higgins (1916–2003): FG TD Laois–Offaly, 1943–1973
      - Thomas's son Michael O'Higgins (1917–2005): FG TD Dublin South-West, Wicklow 1948–1969
        - Michael's wife Brigid Hogan O'Higgins (1932–2022): FG TD Galway 1957–1977
          - her father Patrick Hogan (1891–1936): FG TD Galway 1921–1936
    - Kevin's grandson Chris O'Malley (born 1959): FG MEP Munster 1986–1989
      - Chris' wife Aideen Hayden (born 1959): Lab Senator 2011–2016
- John Sweetman (1844–1936): IPP MP East Wicklow 1892–1895
  - his cousin Roger Sweetman (1874–1954): SF TD Wexford North 1919–1921
    - Roger's son Edmund Sweetman (1912–1968): FG Senator 1948–1951
    - Roger's nephew Gerard Sweetman (1908–1970): FG Senator 1943–1948, TD Kildare 1948–1970

== T ==
- Frank Taylor (1914–1998): FG TD Clare 1969–1981
  - his daughter Madeleine Taylor-Quinn (born 1951): FG TD Clare 1981–1982, 1982–1992, FG Senator 1982, 1993–2002
- Godfrey Timmins (1927–2001): FG TD Wicklow 1965–1997
  - his son Billy Timmins (born 1959): FG/Ind/Renua TD Wicklow 1997–2016
  - his son Edward Timmins: FG TD Wicklow 2024–
- James Tunney (1892–1964): Lab TD Dublin County 1943–1944, Senator 1938–1943, 1944–1961
  - his son Jim Tunney (1924–2002): FF TD Dublin North-West/Dublin Finglas 1969–1992

== U ==
- Pat Upton (1944–1999): Lab Senator 1989–1992, Lab TD Dublin South-Central 1992–1999
  - his sister Mary Upton (born 1946): Lab TD Dublin South-Central 1999–2011

== W ==
- Jack Wall (born 1945): Lab Senator 1993–1997, TD Kildare South 1997–2016
  - his son Mark Wall (born 1970): Lab Senator 2020–2024, TD Kildare South 2024–
- John Wilson (1923–2007): FF TD Cavan 1973–1977, Cavan–Monaghan 1977–1992
  - his nephew Diarmuid Wilson (born 1965): FF Senator 2002–

== Y ==
- W. B. Yeats (1865–1939): Ind Senator 1922–1928
  - his son Michael Yeats (1921–2007): FF Senator 1951–1977, MEP 1973–1979

== See also ==
- List of Irish politicians
- List of female members of Dáil Éireann
- List of female members of Seanad Éireann
- Records of members of the Oireachtas
- Widow's succession

== Sources ==
- ElectionsIreland.org
- Oireachtas members database
- Fallon, Johnny (2011). Dynasties: Irish Political Families. New Island. p. 256. ISBN 978-1-84840-127-3.
