= Michael Kitt =

Michael Kitt may refer to:

- Michael F. Kitt (1914–1974), Irish Fianna Fáil politician and long-serving Teachta Dála
- His son Michael P. Kitt (born 1950), Irish Fianna Fáil party politician, former TD and Senator
