= Minister of State for Overseas Development =

Minister of State for Overseas Development may refer to:

- Minister of State with responsibility for Overseas Development, a junior ministerial style held by a Minister of State at the Department of Foreign Affairs and Trade in the Irish Government
- Secretary of State for International Development, a senior ministerial office in the British Government
