= Tom Kitt =

Tom Kitt may refer to:

- Tom Kitt (politician) (born 1952), former Irish Fianna Fáil politician
- Tom Kitt (musician) (born 1974), American composer and musician
