= Peter Power =

Irish former politician (born 1966)

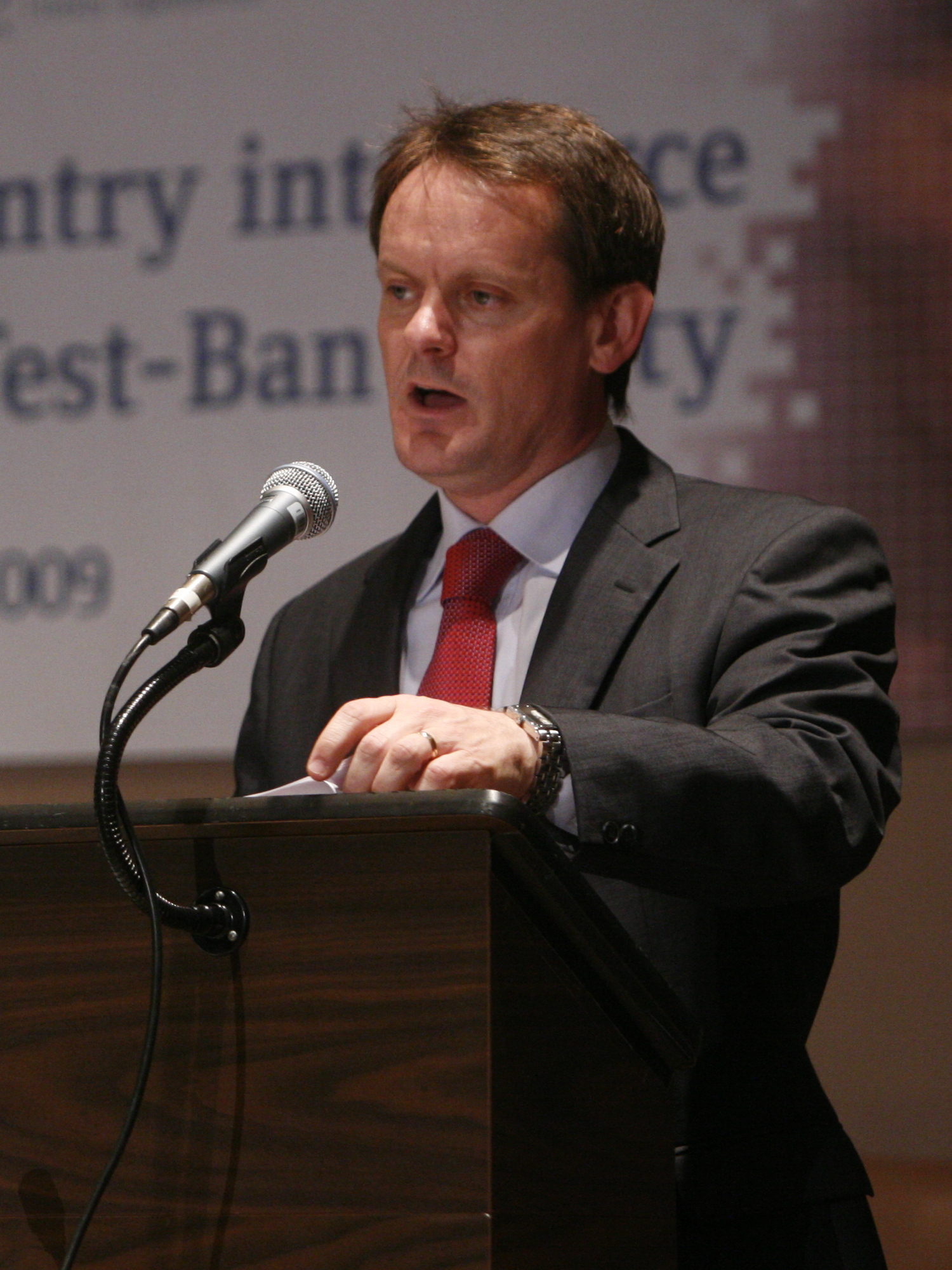
- Power in 2009

Teachta Dála
- In office May 2002 – February 2011
- Constituency: Limerick East

Minister of State
- 2008–2011: Foreign Affairs

Personal details
- Born: 26 January 1966 (age 60) Limerick, Ireland
- Party: Fianna Fáil
- Spouse: Lorraine Power
- Children: 4
- Education: University College Cork

Peter Power (born 26 January 1966) is an Irish former Fianna Fáil politician. He was a Teachta Dála (TD) for the Limerick East constituency from 2002 to 2011, and served as Minister of State for Overseas Development from 2008 to 2011. He has been executive director of UNICEF Ireland since 2011.

== Early and private life ==
Power was born in Limerick, but moved to Dublin after losing his seat at the 2011 general election. He was educated at JFK Memorial School, Ardscoil Rís and University College Cork (UCC). Previous to his election as a TD he worked as a solicitor at Holmes O'Malley Sexton in Limerick.

== Political career ==
Power first contested national elections at the 1997 general election but was unsuccessful on this attempt.

He contested the 1999 local elections in the No. 1 electoral area of Limerick City Council and was the only Fianna Fáil candidate across all four areas to top the poll and become a Limerick City Councillor. Michael Ryan was co-opted in his place in 2003 due to the abolition of the dual mandate.

He was elected to Dáil Éireann at the 2002 general election as a Fianna Fáil TD. He was re-elected at the 2007 general election.

He chaired the Joint Oireachtas Child Protection Committee established by the Oireachtas following the fall-out surrounding the May 2006 Supreme Court judgement in the CC Case. The Committee was convened in July 2006 and made its report in November of the same year. Power also served as a member of the Justice and Transportation committees.

In May 2008, he was appointed as Minister of State for Overseas Development and re-appointed by Taoiseach Brian Cowen on 22 April 2009 following the reduction in the number of Ministers of State from 20 to 15 in which seven serving ministers were not re-appointed.

He lost his seat at the 2011 general election.

In December 2011 Power was appointed executive director of UNICEF Ireland.

Political offices
Preceded by Michael Kitt	Minister of State at the Department of Foreign Affairs; 2008–2011	Succeeded by Jan O'Sullivan as Minister of State at the Department of Foreign Affairs and Trade

Dáil	Election	Deputy (Party)	Deputy (Party)	Deputy (Party)	Deputy (Party)	Deputy (Party)
13th	1948	Michael Keyes (Lab)	Robert Ryan (FF)	James Reidy (FG)	Daniel Bourke (FF)	4 seats 1948–1981
14th	1951	Michael Keyes (Lab)	Tadhg Crowley (FF)	James Reidy (FG)	Daniel Bourke (FF)	4 seats 1948–1981
14th	1952 by-election	Michael Keyes (Lab)	Tadhg Crowley (FF)	James Reidy (FG)	John Carew (FG)	4 seats 1948–1981
15th	1954	Michael Keyes (Lab)	Tadhg Crowley (FF)	Donogh O'Malley (FF)	John Carew (FG)	4 seats 1948–1981
16th	1957	Ted Russell (Ind.)	Paddy Clohessy (FF)	Donogh O'Malley (FF)	John Carew (FG)	4 seats 1948–1981
17th	1961	Stephen Coughlan (Lab)	Paddy Clohessy (FF)	Donogh O'Malley (FF)	Tom O'Donnell (FG)	4 seats 1948–1981
18th	1965	Stephen Coughlan (Lab)	Paddy Clohessy (FF)	Donogh O'Malley (FF)	Tom O'Donnell (FG)	4 seats 1948–1981
18th	1968 by-election	Stephen Coughlan (Lab)	Paddy Clohessy (FF)	Desmond O'Malley (FF)	Tom O'Donnell (FG)	4 seats 1948–1981
19th	1969	Stephen Coughlan (Lab)	Michael Herbert (FF)	Desmond O'Malley (FF)	Tom O'Donnell (FG)	4 seats 1948–1981
20th	1973	Stephen Coughlan (Lab)	Michael Herbert (FF)	Desmond O'Malley (FF)	Tom O'Donnell (FG)	4 seats 1948–1981
21st	1977	Michael Lipper (Ind.)	Michael Herbert (FF)	Desmond O'Malley (FF)	Tom O'Donnell (FG)	4 seats 1948–1981
22nd	1981	Jim Kemmy (Ind.)	Peadar Clohessy (FF)	Desmond O'Malley (FF)	Tom O'Donnell (FG)	Michael Noonan (FG)
23rd	1982 (Feb)	Jim Kemmy (DSP)	Willie O'Dea (FF)	Desmond O'Malley (FF)	Tom O'Donnell (FG)	Michael Noonan (FG)
24th	1982 (Nov)	Frank Prendergast (Lab)	Willie O'Dea (FF)	Desmond O'Malley (FF)	Tom O'Donnell (FG)	Michael Noonan (FG)
25th	1987	Jim Kemmy (DSP)	Willie O'Dea (FF)	Desmond O'Malley (PDs)	Peadar Clohessy (PDs)	Michael Noonan (FG)
26th	1989	Jim Kemmy (DSP)	Willie O'Dea (FF)	Desmond O'Malley (PDs)	Peadar Clohessy (PDs)	Michael Noonan (FG)
27th	1992	Jim Kemmy (Lab)	Willie O'Dea (FF)	Desmond O'Malley (PDs)	Peadar Clohessy (PDs)	Michael Noonan (FG)
28th	1997	Jim Kemmy (Lab)	Willie O'Dea (FF)	Desmond O'Malley (PDs)	Eddie Wade (FF)	Michael Noonan (FG)
28th	1998 by-election	Jan O'Sullivan (Lab)	Willie O'Dea (FF)	Desmond O'Malley (PDs)	Eddie Wade (FF)	Michael Noonan (FG)
29th	2002	Jan O'Sullivan (Lab)	Willie O'Dea (FF)	Tim O'Malley (PDs)	Peter Power (FF)	Michael Noonan (FG)
30th	2007	Jan O'Sullivan (Lab)	Willie O'Dea (FF)	Kieran O'Donnell (FG)	Peter Power (FF)	Michael Noonan (FG)
31st	2011	Constituency abolished. See Limerick City and Limerick				
