= Christopher Dillon Bellew =

Irish gentleman and activist (1763–1826)

Christopher Dillon Bellew (1763 – September 1826) was an Irish Catholic gentleman and activist.

== Life ==
Dillon was the eldest son of Michael Bellew and Jane Dillon of Mountbellew, County Galway. The Bellews were one of the few Irish Catholic families that had prospered during the penal era. Despite this, he was admitted to Trinity College Dublin.

Bellew became heavily involved in the campaign for Catholic Emancipation, joining the Catholic Committee in the 1790s. He came to notice during the convention of 3–8 December 1792, where, disillusioned with the administration of Westmorland, he moved that the petition in favour of Catholic rights would be presented directly to the throne. Chosen as one of the five to present it, he set off to London with Wolfe Tone; the king received them personally and with respect, speaking individually to each man.

Bellew was a tireless administrator of his estate, his income in 1793 in the region of £5,000; by 1800 it amounted to some 10,000 acres (40 km^{2}). He was respected by his tenants as an improving landlord, and amassed one of the finest libraries in the west of Ireland. A catalogue, published in 1813, contained almost ninety-two pages.

On 27 October 1794 he married Olivia Emily Nugent, only daughter of Anthony, 4th Lord Riverston. They had a son, Michael Dillon Bellew, who became the first Roman Catholic sheriff in Galway since the 17th century, and was in 1838 created a baronet.

Bellew died on 23 April 1826, his wife in September 1856.

== See also ==
- Grattan-Bellew baronets
