= Áine Brady =

Irish former politician (born 1954)

Minister of State
- 2009–2011: Social and Family Affairs
- 2009–2011: Health and Children
- 2009–2011: Environment, Heritage and Local Government

Teachta Dála
- In office May 2007 – February 2011
- Constituency: Kildare North

Personal details
- Born: Áine Kitt; 8 September 1954 (age 72) Galway, Ireland
- Party: Fianna Fáil
- Spouse: Gerry Brady (m. 1994)
- Children: 4
- Parent: Michael F. Kitt (father)
- Relatives: Tom Kitt (brother); Michael P. Kitt (brother); David Kitt (nephew)
- Education: University College Dublin

Áine Brady (née Kitt; born 8 September 1954) is an Irish former Fianna Fáil politician who served as a Minister of State from 2009 to 2011. She was a Teachta Dála (TD) for the Kildare North constituency from 2007 to 2011.

She was Fianna Fáil's youth organiser in the early 1980s, and a member of the party's national executive. Her first electoral outing was at the 1981 election to the 15th Seanad, when she stood unsuccessfully on the Cultural and Educational Panel.

She was a teacher at Scoil na Mainistreach in Celbridge for 22 years. She was an unsuccessful candidate for Dáil Éireann at the Kildare North by-election in 2005, but won a seat at the 2007 general election.

Brady is the sister of former Fianna Fáil chief whip Tom Kitt and of former Minister of State Michael P. Kitt, and the daughter of former TD Michael F. Kitt. She is married to former TD Gerry Brady, they have four children.

On 22 April 2009, as part of a junior ministerial reshuffle, Brady was appointed as Minister of State at the Departments of Health and Children, Social and Family Affairs and the Environment, Heritage and Local Government, with special responsibility for Older People and Health Promotion.

She lost her seat at the 2011 general election.

Brady and her husband attended the 2020 Oireachtas Golf Society Dinner.

== See also ==
- Families in the Oireachtas

Political offices
Preceded by Barry Andrews; Máire Hoctor; John Moloney; Mary Wallace	Minister of State at the Department of Health and Children; 2009–2011; With: Barry Andrews; John Moloney; Trevor Sargent (2009–2010)	Succeeded by Kathleen Lynch; Róisín Shortall as Minister of State at the Department of Health
Preceded by Máire Hoctor	Minister of State at the Department of Social and Family Affairs; 2009–2011	Position vacant
Preceded by Máire Hoctor; Michael P. Kitt	Minister of State at the Department of the Environment, Heritage and Local Government; 2009–2011; With: Michael Finneran; Ciarán Cuffe (2010–2011)	Succeeded by Willie Penrose; Fergus O'Dowd as Minister of State at the Department of the Environment, Community and Local Government

Dáil	Election	Deputy (Party)	Deputy (Party)	Deputy (Party)	Deputy (Party)	Deputy (Party)
28th	1997	Emmet Stagg (Lab)	Charlie McCreevy (FF)	Bernard Durkan (FG)	3 seats until 2007	
29th	2002	Emmet Stagg (Lab)	Charlie McCreevy (FF)	Bernard Durkan (FG)	3 seats until 2007	
29th	2005 by-election	Emmet Stagg (Lab)	Catherine Murphy (Ind.)	Bernard Durkan (FG)	3 seats until 2007	
30th	2007	Emmet Stagg (Lab)	Áine Brady (FF)	Bernard Durkan (FG)	Michael Fitzpatrick (FF)	4 seats until 2024
31st	2011	Emmet Stagg (Lab)	Catherine Murphy (Ind.)	Bernard Durkan (FG)	Anthony Lawlor (FG)	4 seats until 2024
32nd	2016	Frank O'Rourke (FF)	Catherine Murphy (SD)	Bernard Durkan (FG)	James Lawless (FF)	4 seats until 2024
33rd	2020	Réada Cronin (SF)	Catherine Murphy (SD)	Bernard Durkan (FG)	James Lawless (FF)	4 seats until 2024
34th	2024	Réada Cronin (SF)	Aidan Farrelly (SD)	Joe Neville (FG)	James Lawless (FF)	Naoise Ó Cearúil (FF)
