= James Lawlor Kiernan =

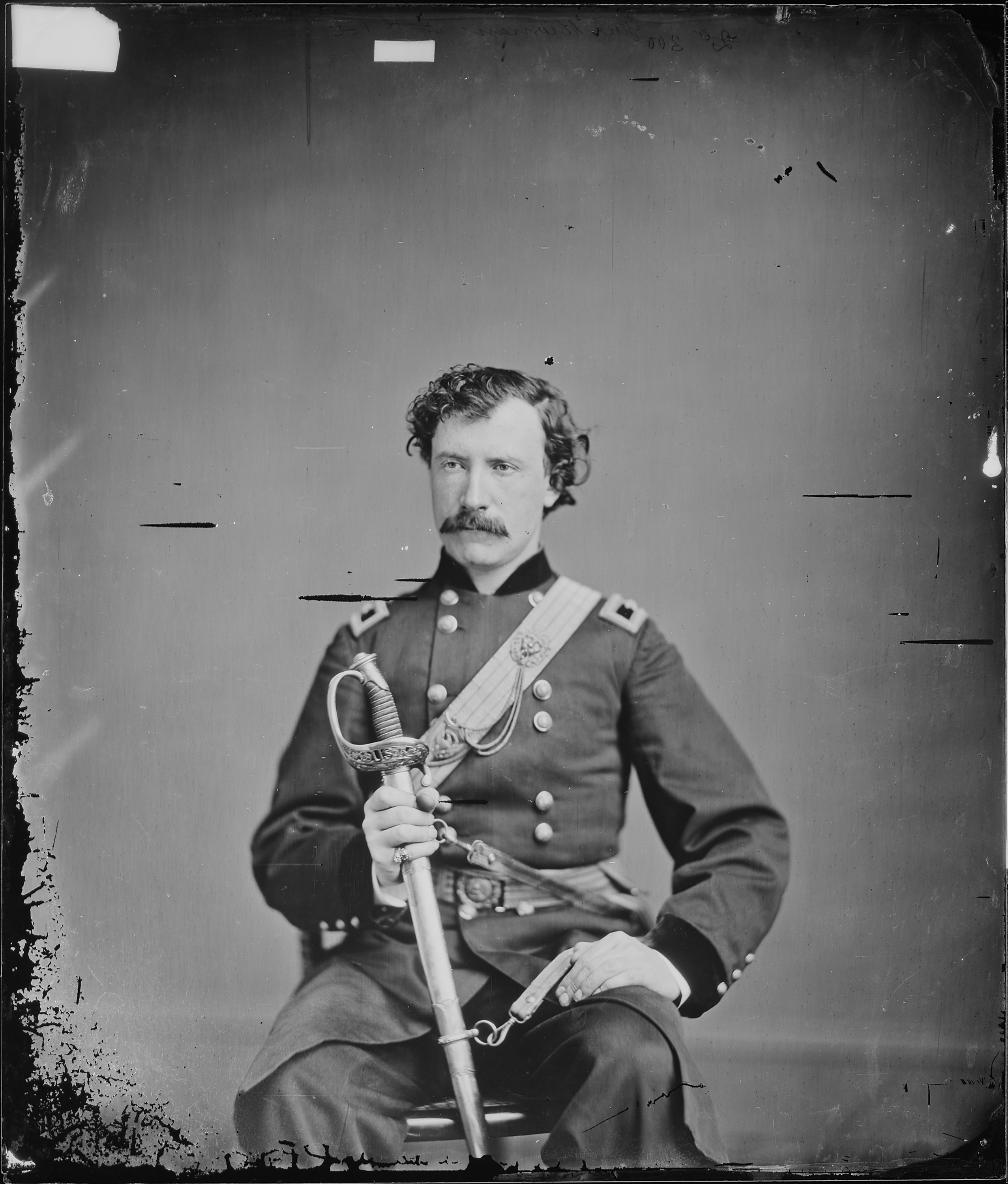
Gen. Kiernan during the Civil War

James Lawlor Kiernan (26 October 1837 – 29 November 1869) was an Irish-born Brigadier General in the Union Army during the American Civil War.

== Biography ==
Kiernan was born in Mountbellew, County Galway, in 1837. His father was a retired British Navy surgeon. Kiernan attended Trinity College, Dublin, before emigrating to the United States about 1854. On the outbreak of the Civil War in 1861, he joined the 69th New York Infantry Regiment as assistant surgeon. He served as such at Bull Run and in the same capacity to the 6th Missouri Infantry Regiment at Pea Ridge.

Kiernan insisted on joining the fighting ranks and, in that capacity, was seemingly appointed a Major in the 6th Missouri. In May 1863 at Port Gibson, Mississippi, he was wounded in the left lung and left on the field for dead. Recovered and imprisoned, he effected an escape back to Union forces and resigned his commission. On 1 August 1863, he was commissioned a brigadier general of Volunteers by President Abraham Lincoln, commanding a post at Miliken's Bend on the Mississippi. However, ill-health as a result of his battlefield wounds forced him to resign on 3 February 1864.

About May 1865, he gained a US consular post at Zhenjiang in China. However, his continued ill health forced him to return to New York, where he became an examining physician for the Pension Bureau. He was still serving in that capacity upon his death on 26 November 1869; the official cause of death being congestion of the lungs. He is buried in Green-Wood Cemetery in Brooklyn.

== See also ==
- List of American Civil War generals (Union)
