= Michael P. Kitt =

Irish former politician (born 1950)

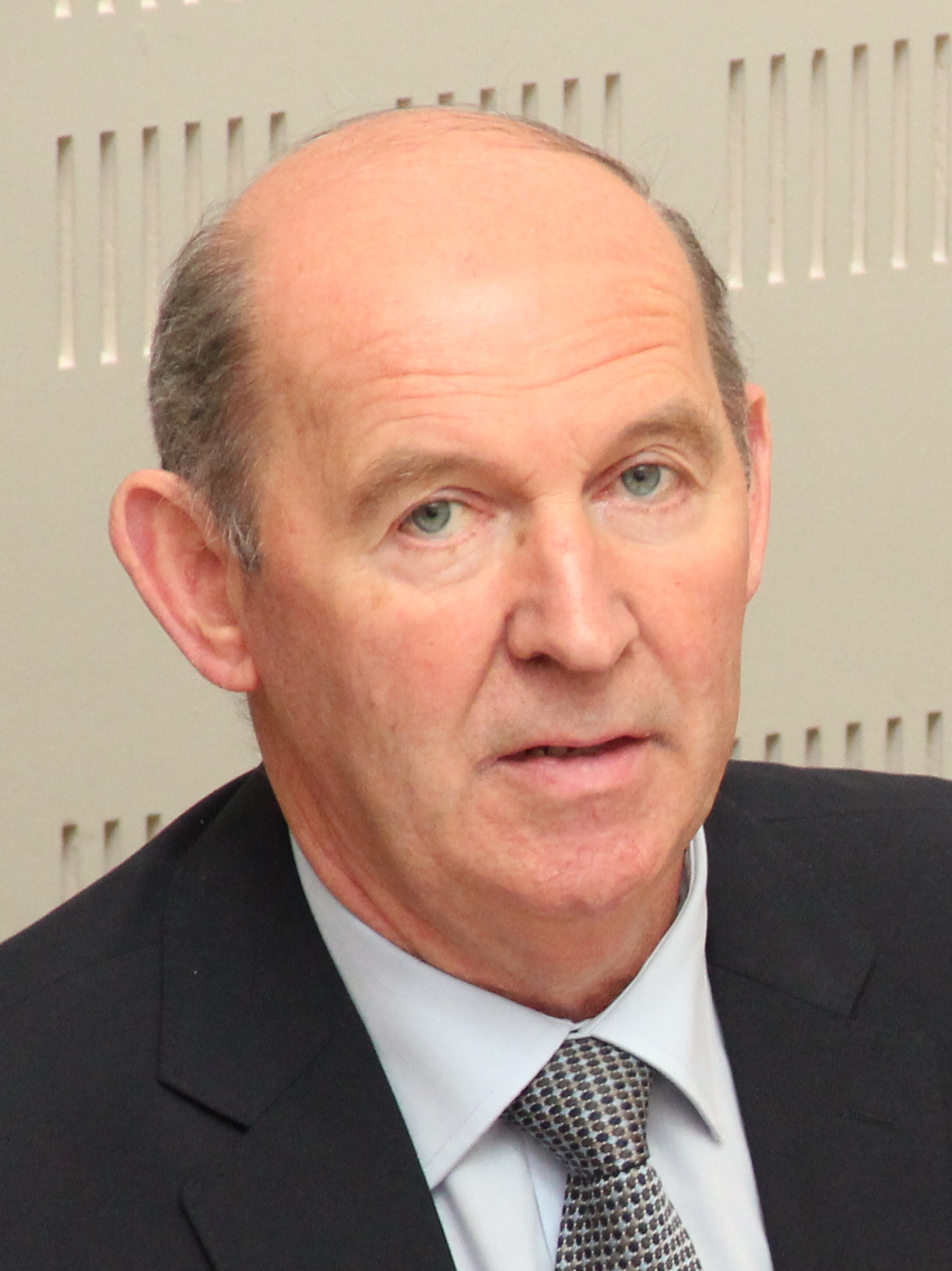
- Kitt in 2015

Leas-Cheann Comhairle of Dáil Éireann
- In office 31 March 2011 – 3 February 2016
- Ceann Comhairle: Seán Barrett
- Preceded by: Brendan Howlin
- Succeeded by: Pat "the Cope" Gallagher

Minister of State
- 2008–2009: Environment, Heritage and Local Government
- 2007–2008: Foreign Affairs
- 1991–1992: Taoiseach

Teachta Dála
- In office May 2007 – February 2016
- In office June 1981 – May 2002
- Constituency: Galway East
- In office March 1975 – June 1977
- Constituency: Galway North-East

Senator
- In office 12 September 2002 – 24 May 2007
- Constituency: Nominated by the Taoiseach
- In office 27 October 1977 – 11 June 1981
- Constituency: Administrative Panel

Personal details
- Born: 17 May 1950 (age 76) Tuam, County Galway, Ireland
- Party: Fianna Fáil
- Parent: Michael F. Kitt (father)
- Relatives: Tom Kitt (brother); Áine Brady (sister); Gerry Brady (brother-in-law)
- Education: St Patrick's College, Dublin; University College Galway; University College Dublin

Michael Paschal Kitt (born 17 May 1950) is an Irish former Fianna Fáil politician who served as Leas-Cheann Comhairle of Dáil Éireann from 2011 to 2016, a Minister of State from 1991 to 1992, and from 2007 to 2009. He served as a Teachta Dála (TD) for the Galway East constituency from 1975 to 1977, 1981 to 2002, and 2007 to 2016. He was a Senator from 2002 to 2007, after being nominated by the Taoiseach and from 1977 to 1981 for the Administrative Panel.

== Early life ==
Born in Tuam, County Galway, Kitt was educated St Jarlath's College, Tuam; St Patrick's College of Education, Dublin; University College Dublin and University College Galway. He qualified as a teacher before becoming involved in politics.

== Politics ==
In 1975, following the death of his father, Michael F. Kitt, he was elected to succeed his father on Galway County Council. In the Galway North-East by-election on 4 March he was elected to the 20th Dáil, being returned on the first count with a 7% majority over the Fine Gael candidate Paul Connaughton Snr.

Kitt lost his Dáil seat at the 1977 general election but was subsequently elected to Seanad Éireann by the Administrative Panel, serving until 1981 as a member of the 14th Seanad. He was re-elected to the Dáil at the 1981 general election for the new Galway East and retained his seat until 2002.

During this period he served as a Minister of State at the Department of the Taoiseach for three months from November 1991 to February 1992. He lost his Dáil seat at the 2002 general election but was subsequently nominated by the Taoiseach to serve as a member of the 22nd Seanad. He was re-elected to the Dáil at the 2007 general election. In June 2007, he was appointed by Bertie Ahern as Minister of State at the Department of Foreign Affairs with responsibility for Overseas Development. In May 2008, when Brian Cowen succeeded as Taoiseach, he was appointed as Minister of State at the Department of the Environment, Heritage and Local Government with special responsibility for Local Services. He served in this position until April 2009 when he was dropped when Cowen reduced the number of junior ministers from 20 to 15.

On 31 March 2011, he was elected as Leas-Cheann Comhairle of Dáil Éireann, serving for the 31st Dáil.

He did not contest the 2016 general election and retired from politics.

== Family ==
Michael Kitt comes from a political family. He is a son of Michael F. Kitt, who was a TD for various Galway constituencies (1948–1951 and 1957–1975), and a brother of Tom Kitt, a TD for Dublin South from 1987 to 2011, and of Áine Brady, a TD for Kildare North from 2007 to 2011. His brother-in-law Gerry Brady also served as TD for Kildare in 1982.

== See also ==
- Families in the Oireachtas

Political offices
| Preceded by Vincent Brady; Brendan Daly; Máire Geoghegan-Quinn | Minister of State at the Department of the Taoiseach; 1991–1992; With: Dermot Ahern; Brendan Daly | Succeeded by Noel Dempsey; Tom Kitt |
| Preceded by Conor Lenihan; Noel Treacy | Minister of State at the Department of Foreign Affairs; 2007–2008; With: Dick Roche | Succeeded by Dick Roche; Peter Power |
| Preceded by Máire Hoctor; Tony Killeen; Batt O'Keeffe | Minister of State at the Department of the Environment, Heritage and Local Government; 2008–2009; With: Michael Finneran; Máire Hoctor | Succeeded by Áine Brady; Michael Finneran |
| Preceded by Brendan Howlin | Leas-Cheann Comhairle of Dáil Éireann; 2011–2016 | Succeeded by Pat "the Cope" Gallagher |

| Dáil | Election | Deputy (Party) | Deputy (Party) | Deputy (Party) |
|---|---|---|---|---|
| 19th | 1969 | Thomas Hussey (FF) | Michael F. Kitt (FF) | John Donnellan (FG) |
| 20th | 1973 | Thomas Hussey (FF) | Michael F. Kitt (FF) | John Donnellan (FG) |
| 20th | 1975 by-election | Thomas Hussey (FF) | Michael P. Kitt (FF) | John Donnellan (FG) |
| 21st | 1977 | Constituency abolished. See Galway East | | |

| Dáil | Election | Deputy (Party) | Deputy (Party) | Deputy (Party) | Deputy (Party) |
|---|---|---|---|---|---|
| 9th | 1937 | Frank Fahy (FF) | Mark Killilea Snr (FF) | Patrick Beegan (FF) | Seán Broderick (FG) |
| 10th | 1938 | Frank Fahy (FF) | Mark Killilea Snr (FF) | Patrick Beegan (FF) | Seán Broderick (FG) |
| 11th | 1943 | Frank Fahy (FF) | Mark Killilea Snr (FF) | Patrick Beegan (FF) | Michael Donnellan (CnaT) |
| 12th | 1944 | Frank Fahy (FF) | Mark Killilea Snr (FF) | Patrick Beegan (FF) | Michael Donnellan (CnaT) |
| 13th | 1948 | Constituency abolished. See Galway North and Galway South | | | |

| Dáil | Election | Deputy (Party) | Deputy (Party) | Deputy (Party) | Deputy (Party) | Deputy (Party) |
|---|---|---|---|---|---|---|
| 17th | 1961 | Michael F. Kitt (FF) | Anthony Millar (FF) | Michael Carty (FF) | Michael Donnellan (CnaT) | Brigid Hogan-O'Higgins (FG) |
| 17th | 1964 by-election | Michael F. Kitt (FF) | Anthony Millar (FF) | Michael Carty (FF) | John Donnellan (FG) | Brigid Hogan-O'Higgins (FG) |
| 18th | 1965 | Michael F. Kitt (FF) | Anthony Millar (FF) | Michael Carty (FF) | John Donnellan (FG) | Brigid Hogan-O'Higgins (FG) |
| 19th | 1969 | Constituency abolished. See Galway North-East and Clare–South Galway | | | | |

| Dáil | Election | Deputy (Party) | Deputy (Party) | Deputy (Party) | Deputy (Party) |
|---|---|---|---|---|---|
| 21st | 1977 | Johnny Callanan (FF) | Thomas Hussey (FF) | Mark Killilea Jnr (FF) | John Donnellan (FG) |
| 22nd | 1981 | Johnny Callanan (FF) | Michael P. Kitt (FF) | Paul Connaughton Snr (FG) | 3 seats 1981–1997 |
| 23rd | 1982 (Feb) | Johnny Callanan (FF) | Michael P. Kitt (FF) | Paul Connaughton Snr (FG) | 3 seats 1981–1997 |
| 23rd | 1982 by-election | Noel Treacy (FF) | Michael P. Kitt (FF) | Paul Connaughton Snr (FG) | 3 seats 1981–1997 |
| 24th | 1982 (Nov) | Noel Treacy (FF) | Michael P. Kitt (FF) | Paul Connaughton Snr (FG) | 3 seats 1981–1997 |
| 25th | 1987 | Noel Treacy (FF) | Michael P. Kitt (FF) | Paul Connaughton Snr (FG) | 3 seats 1981–1997 |
| 26th | 1989 | Noel Treacy (FF) | Michael P. Kitt (FF) | Paul Connaughton Snr (FG) | 3 seats 1981–1997 |
| 27th | 1992 | Noel Treacy (FF) | Michael P. Kitt (FF) | Paul Connaughton Snr (FG) | 3 seats 1981–1997 |
| 28th | 1997 | Noel Treacy (FF) | Michael P. Kitt (FF) | Paul Connaughton Snr (FG) | Ulick Burke (FG) |
| 29th | 2002 | Noel Treacy (FF) | Joe Callanan (FF) | Paul Connaughton Snr (FG) | Paddy McHugh (Ind.) |
| 30th | 2007 | Noel Treacy (FF) | Michael P. Kitt (FF) | Paul Connaughton Snr (FG) | Ulick Burke (FG) |
| 31st | 2011 | Colm Keaveney (Lab) | Michael P. Kitt (FF) | Ciarán Cannon (FG) | Paul Connaughton Jnr (FG) |
| 32nd | 2016 | Seán Canney (Ind.) | Anne Rabbitte (FF) | Ciarán Cannon (FG) | 3 seats 2016–2024 |
| 33rd | 2020 | Seán Canney (Ind.) | Anne Rabbitte (FF) | Ciarán Cannon (FG) | 3 seats 2016–2024 |
| 34th | 2024 | Seán Canney (Ind.) | Albert Dolan (FF) | Peter Roche (FG) | Louis O'Hara (SF) |
