= 1975 Galway North-East by-election =

By-election to the 20th Dáil

- 4 March 1975
- Turnout: 27,420 (73.8%)
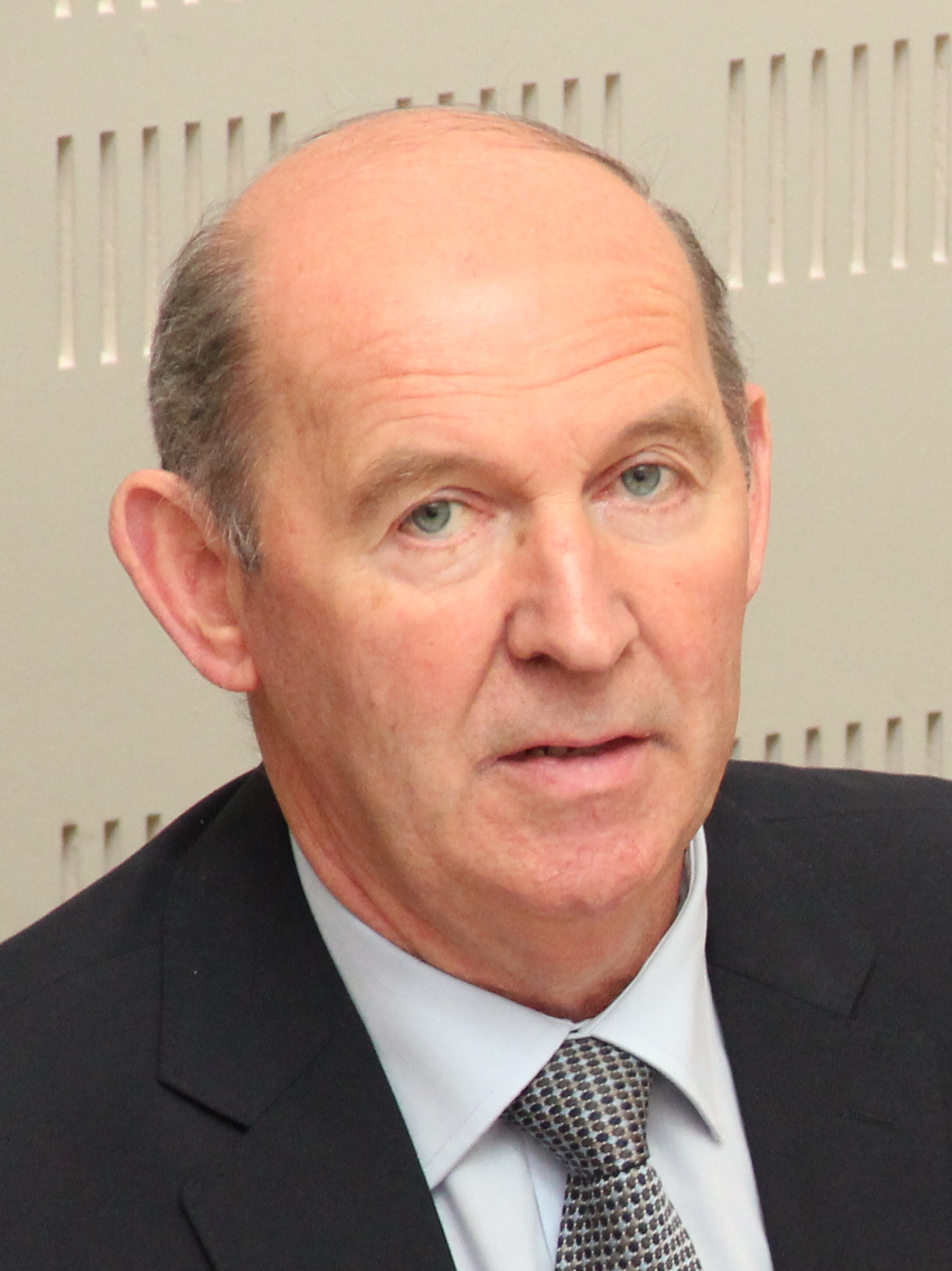
		Connaughton	Morgan
Nominee	Michael P. Kitt	Paul Connaughton Snr	Norman Morgan
Party	Fianna Fáil	Fine Gael	Independent
First preferences	14,479	12,532	409
Percentage	52.8%	45.7%	1.5%
TD before election
Michael F. Kitt
Fianna Fáil
TD after election
Michael P. Kitt
Fianna Fáil

A Dáil by-election was held in the constituency of Galway North-East in Ireland on Tuesday, 4 March 1975, to fill a vacancy in the 20th Dáil. It followed the death of Fianna Fáil Teachta Dála (TD) Michael F. Kitt on 24 December 1974.

The writ of election was moved by Fianna Fáil TD Patrick Lalor on 11 February 1975 and was agreed by the Dáil.

The by-election was won by the Fianna Fáil candidate Michael P. Kitt, son of the deceased TD, Michael F. Kitt.

It was held on the same day as the 1975 Galway West by-election. Both by-elections were won by Fianna Fáil candidates.

== Result ==
1975 Galway North-East by-election
Party	Candidate	FPv%	Count
Party	Candidate	FPv%	1
Fianna Fáil	Michael P. Kitt	52.8	14,479
Fine Gael	Paul Connaughton Snr	45.7	12,532
Independent	Norman Morgan	1.5	409
Electorate: 37,176 Valid: 27,420 Quota: 13,711 Turnout: 73.8%
