= Mountbellew Agricultural College =

Agricultural school in Mountbellew, Ireland

Coordinates: 53.4686°N 8.4938°W

Mountbellew Agricultural College or Franciscan Brothers College is a training college for the farming and agricultural industry in Mountbellew, County Galway, Ireland. It was founded in 1904 by the Franciscan Brothers, who previously had a secondary school on the location, and was the first such college in Ireland. It is a private college but runs courses in association with the Irish governments Agricultural and Food Development Authority (Teagasc) and the nearby Atlantic Technological University Mountbellew campus (GMIT).

The association with GMIT originates in the association with its predecessor the Galway Regional Technical College, with whom Mountbellew commenced in 1986 a Higher Certificate in Business Studies (agribusiness) which had pathways on to a degree in business. In 1998, an evening course in business studies for adults commenced. 2001 saw the start of a Higher Certificate in Agriculture, which allows students to progress to a bachelor's degree in Science in Agriculture and Environmental Management. Galway Mayo Institute of Technology. The links with GMIT have strengthened and students can now choose between two degrees (Rural Enterprise & Agribusiness or Agriculture & Environmental Management). These students spend time between the Mountbellew and Galway campuses.

Former Galway West Fine Gael TD Paul Connaughton Jnr attended Mountbellew qualifying with a degree in business from GMIT.
