= Galway North-East =

Dáil constituency (1969–1977)

- Former Dáil constituency

Former constituency
- Created: 1969
- Abolished: 1977
- Seats: 3
- Local government area: County Galway; County Roscommon
- Created from: Galway East
- Replaced by: Galway East

Galway North-East was a parliamentary constituency represented in Dáil Éireann, the lower house of the Irish parliament or Oireachtas from 1969 to 1977. The constituency elected 3 deputies (Teachtaí Dála, commonly known as TDs) to the Dáil, on the system of proportional representation by means of the single transferable vote (PR-STV).

== History and boundaries ==
The constituency was created under the Electoral (Amendment) Act 1969 for the 1969 general election to Dáil Éireann. It was abolished under the Electoral (Amendment) Act 1974, with effect from the 1977 general election.

Its boundaries were defined by the 1969 Act as:

- the administrative county of Galway, except the parts thereof which were comprised in the constituencies of Clare–South Galway and Galway West;
- part of County Roscommon, comprising all or part of the former rural districts of Athlone No. 2, Castlereagh and Roscommon.

== TDs ==
Teachtaí Dála (TDs) for Galway North-East 1969–1977
Key to parties: FF = Fianna Fáil; FG = Fine Gael
Dáil	Election	Deputy (Party)	Deputy (Party)	Deputy (Party)
19th	1969	Thomas Hussey (FF)	Michael F. Kitt (FF)	John Donnellan (FG)
20th	1973	Thomas Hussey (FF)	Michael F. Kitt (FF)	John Donnellan (FG)
20th	1975 by-election	Thomas Hussey (FF)	Michael P. Kitt (FF)	John Donnellan (FG)
21st	1977	Constituency abolished. See Galway East		

Note: The columns in this table are used only for presentational purposes, and no significance should be attached to the order of columns. For details of the order in which seats were won at each election, see the detailed results of that election.

== Elections ==
*: Outgoing TD

=== 1975 by-election ===
Following the death of Fianna Fáil TD Michael F. Kitt, a by-election was held on 4 March 1975. The seat was won by the Fianna Fáil candidate Michael P. Kitt, son of the deceased TD.

1975 by-election: Galway North-East
Party	Candidate	FPv%	Count
Party	Candidate	FPv%	1
Fianna Fáil	Michael P. Kitt	52.8	14,479
Fine Gael	Paul Connaughton Snr	45.7	12,532
Independent	Norman Morgan	1.5	409
Electorate: 37,176 Valid: 27,420 Quota: 13,711 Turnout: 73.8%

=== 1973 general election ===
1973 general election: Galway North-East
Party	Candidate	FPv%	Count				
Party	Candidate	FPv%	1	2	3	4	5
Fine Gael	John Donnellan	25.3	6,636				
Fianna Fáil	Michael F. Kitt	21.1	5,523	5,526	5,652	5,872	7,827
Fianna Fáil	Thomas Hussey	20.4	5,340	5,345	5,518	5,976	8,014
Fianna Fáil	Mark Killilea Jnr	16.5	4,336	4,341	4,443	4,593	
Fine Gael	Michael Mitchell	8.7	2,269	2,305	3,959		
Fine Gael	Michael Ryan	8.1	2,113	2,145			
Electorate: 34,358 Valid: 26,217 Quota: 6,555 Turnout: 76.3%

=== 1969 general election ===
1969 general election: Galway North-East
Party	Candidate	FPv%	Count			
Party	Candidate	FPv%	1	2	3	4
Fine Gael	John Donnellan	26.8	7,097			
Fianna Fáil	Michael F. Kitt	22.6	5,991	6,010	6,336	6,914
Fianna Fáil	Thomas Hussey	21.1	5,571	5,597	5,872	6,871
Fine Gael	Patrick Cunningham	9.6	2,548	2,751	3,158	3,222
Fianna Fáil	Patrick Moylan	7.0	1,858	1,867	1,906	
Labour	William Burke	6.6	1,748	1,800		
Fine Gael	Michael Ryan	6.3	1,664	1,832	2,156	2,224
Electorate: 34,525 Valid: 26,477 Quota: 6,620 Turnout: 76.7%

== See also ==
- Dáil constituencies
- Politics of the Republic of Ireland
- Historic Dáil constituencies
- Elections in the Republic of Ireland
