= Michael F. Kitt =

Irish politician (1914–1974)

Parliamentary Secretary
- 1970–1973: Gaeltacht

Teachta Dála
- In office July 1969 – 24 December 1974
- Constituency: Galway North-East
- In office October 1961 – June 1969
- Constituency: Galway East
- In office March 1957 – September 1961
- In office February 1948 – May 1951
- Constituency: Galway North

Personal details
- Born: 13 September 1914 Mountbellew, County Galway, Ireland
- Died: 24 December 1974 (aged 60) Castleblakeney, County Galway, Ireland
- Party: Fianna Fáil
- Children: Michael, Tom, Áine
- Relatives: Gerry Brady (son-in-law)
- Occupation: Farmer and national school teacher

Michael F. Kitt (13 September 1914 – 24 December 1974) was an Irish Fianna Fáil politician and long-serving Teachta Dála (TD).

Kitt was born in Mountbellew, County Galway, the son of Thomas Kitt, master of Mountbellew workhouse, and Kathleen Sheehey.

He was elected to Dáil Éireann for the first time at the 1948 general election for the Galway North constituency, but lost his seat at the 1951 general election, and failed to be elected again at the 1954 general election. Kitt was re-elected to Dáil Éireann for Galway North at the 1957 general election, and elsewhere at the next four general elections: for Galway East in 1961 and 1965, and for Galway North-East in 1969 and 1973.

In the wake of the Arms Crisis in May 1970, Kitt was appointed Parliamentary Secretary to the Minister for the Gaeltacht, serving in that position until 1973. He died in 1974, midway through the 20th Dáil.

His son Michael P. Kitt was elected in the subsequent by-election. Kitt's other son, Tom, was a TD from 1987 to 2011. Kitt's daughter, Áine Brady, is also a member of Fianna Fáil and served in the Dáil from 2007 to 2011. Her husband, Gerard Brady, is a former TD.

== See also ==
- Families in the Oireachtas

Political offices
Preceded by Gerry Collins	Parliamentary Secretary to the Minister for the Gaeltacht; 1970–1973	Office abolished

Dáil	Election	Deputy (Party)	Deputy (Party)	Deputy (Party)
13th	1948	Mark Killilea Snr (FF)	Michael F. Kitt (FF)	Michael Donnellan (CnaT)
14th	1951	Mark Killilea Snr (FF)	James Hession (FG)	Michael Donnellan (CnaT)
15th	1954	Mark Killilea Snr (FF)	James Hession (FG)	Michael Donnellan (CnaT)
16th	1957	Mark Killilea Snr (FF)	Michael F. Kitt (FF)	Michael Donnellan (CnaT)
17th	1961	Constituency abolished. See Galway East and Galway West		

Dáil	Election	Deputy (Party)	Deputy (Party)	Deputy (Party)	Deputy (Party)
9th	1937	Frank Fahy (FF)	Mark Killilea Snr (FF)	Patrick Beegan (FF)	Seán Broderick (FG)
10th	1938	Frank Fahy (FF)	Mark Killilea Snr (FF)	Patrick Beegan (FF)	Seán Broderick (FG)
11th	1943	Frank Fahy (FF)	Mark Killilea Snr (FF)	Patrick Beegan (FF)	Michael Donnellan (CnaT)
12th	1944	Frank Fahy (FF)	Mark Killilea Snr (FF)	Patrick Beegan (FF)	Michael Donnellan (CnaT)
13th	1948	Constituency abolished. See Galway North and Galway South			

Dáil	Election	Deputy (Party)	Deputy (Party)	Deputy (Party)	Deputy (Party)	Deputy (Party)
17th	1961	Michael F. Kitt (FF)	Anthony Millar (FF)	Michael Carty (FF)	Michael Donnellan (CnaT)	Brigid Hogan-O'Higgins (FG)
17th	1964 by-election	Michael F. Kitt (FF)	Anthony Millar (FF)	Michael Carty (FF)	John Donnellan (FG)	Brigid Hogan-O'Higgins (FG)
18th	1965	Michael F. Kitt (FF)	Anthony Millar (FF)	Michael Carty (FF)	John Donnellan (FG)	Brigid Hogan-O'Higgins (FG)
19th	1969	Constituency abolished. See Galway North-East and Clare–South Galway				

Dáil	Election	Deputy (Party)	Deputy (Party)	Deputy (Party)	Deputy (Party)
21st	1977	Johnny Callanan (FF)	Thomas Hussey (FF)	Mark Killilea Jnr (FF)	John Donnellan (FG)
22nd	1981	Johnny Callanan (FF)	Michael P. Kitt (FF)	Paul Connaughton Snr (FG)	3 seats 1981–1997
23rd	1982 (Feb)	Johnny Callanan (FF)	Michael P. Kitt (FF)	Paul Connaughton Snr (FG)	3 seats 1981–1997
23rd	1982 by-election	Noel Treacy (FF)	Michael P. Kitt (FF)	Paul Connaughton Snr (FG)	3 seats 1981–1997
24th	1982 (Nov)	Noel Treacy (FF)	Michael P. Kitt (FF)	Paul Connaughton Snr (FG)	3 seats 1981–1997
25th	1987	Noel Treacy (FF)	Michael P. Kitt (FF)	Paul Connaughton Snr (FG)	3 seats 1981–1997
26th	1989	Noel Treacy (FF)	Michael P. Kitt (FF)	Paul Connaughton Snr (FG)	3 seats 1981–1997
27th	1992	Noel Treacy (FF)	Michael P. Kitt (FF)	Paul Connaughton Snr (FG)	3 seats 1981–1997
28th	1997	Noel Treacy (FF)	Michael P. Kitt (FF)	Paul Connaughton Snr (FG)	Ulick Burke (FG)
29th	2002	Noel Treacy (FF)	Joe Callanan (FF)	Paul Connaughton Snr (FG)	Paddy McHugh (Ind.)
30th	2007	Noel Treacy (FF)	Michael P. Kitt (FF)	Paul Connaughton Snr (FG)	Ulick Burke (FG)
31st	2011	Colm Keaveney (Lab)	Michael P. Kitt (FF)	Ciarán Cannon (FG)	Paul Connaughton Jnr (FG)
32nd	2016	Seán Canney (Ind.)	Anne Rabbitte (FF)	Ciarán Cannon (FG)	3 seats 2016–2024
33rd	2020	Seán Canney (Ind.)	Anne Rabbitte (FF)	Ciarán Cannon (FG)	3 seats 2016–2024
34th	2024	Seán Canney (Ind.)	Albert Dolan (FF)	Peter Roche (FG)	Louis O'Hara (SF)

Dáil	Election	Deputy (Party)	Deputy (Party)	Deputy (Party)
19th	1969	Thomas Hussey (FF)	Michael F. Kitt (FF)	John Donnellan (FG)
20th	1973	Thomas Hussey (FF)	Michael F. Kitt (FF)	John Donnellan (FG)
20th	1975 by-election	Thomas Hussey (FF)	Michael P. Kitt (FF)	John Donnellan (FG)
21st	1977	Constituency abolished. See Galway East		
