= Minister of State at the Department of Foreign Affairs and Trade =

List of Irish Ministers of State

The minister of state at the Department of Foreign Affairs and Trade is a junior ministerial post in the Department of Foreign Affairs and Trade of the Government of Ireland who may perform functions delegated by the minister for foreign affairs and trade. A minister of state does not hold cabinet rank.

There are currently two ministers of state:

- Neale Richmond, TD – Minister of State with special responsibility for International development and the diaspora; and
- Thomas Byrne, TD – Minister of State with special responsibility for European Affairs.

== List of parliamentary secretaries ==
=== Department of External Affairs 1933–1943 ===
Name	Term of office		Party	Government
Patrick Little	1 March 1933	27 September 1939	Fianna Fáil	7th EC • 8th EC • 1st • 2nd
Paddy Smith	27 September 1939	1 July 1943	Fianna Fáil	2nd
=== Department of Foreign Affairs 1977–1978 ===
Name	Term of office		Party	Government
David Andrews	5 July 1977	1 January 1978	Fianna Fáil	15th

== List of ministers of state ==
=== Department of Foreign Affairs 1978–2011 ===
Name	Term of office		Party	Responsibilities	Government
David Andrews	1 January 1978	11 December 1979	Fianna Fáil		15th
Jim O'Keeffe	30 June 1981	9 March 1982	Fine Gael	Overseas development	17th
Jim O'Keeffe	16 December 1982	13 February 1986	Fine Gael	Overseas development	19th
George Birmingham	13 February 1986	10 March 1987	Fine Gael	European Affairs and Development Co-operation	19th
Seán Calleary	12 March 1987	12 July 1989	Fianna Fáil	Overseas Aid	20th
Seán Calleary	19 July 1989	11 February 1992	Fianna Fáil	Overseas Aid	21st
Brendan Daly	13 February 1992	12 January 1993	Fianna Fáil		22nd
Tom Kitt	14 January 1993	15 December 1994	Fianna Fáil	European Affairs and Overseas development assistance	23rd
Joan Burton	20 December 1994	26 June 1997	Labour	Overseas development assistance	24th
Gay Mitchell	20 December 1994	26 June 1997	Fine Gael	European Affairs	24th
Liz O'Donnell	1 July 1997	6 June 2002	Progressive Democrats	Overseas development assistance and Human rights	25th
Dick Roche	6 June 2002	29 September 2004	Fianna Fáil	European Affairs	26th
Tom Kitt	19 June 2002	29 September 2004	Fianna Fáil	Overseas development and Human rights	26th
Conor Lenihan	5 October 2004	20 June 2007	Fianna Fáil	Overseas development	26th
Noel Treacy	29 September 2004	20 June 2007	Fianna Fáil	European Affairs	26th
Michael Kitt	20 June 2007	13 May 2008	Fianna Fáil	Overseas development	27th
Dick Roche	14 June 2007	9 March 2011	Fianna Fáil	European Affairs	27th • 28th
Peter Power	13 May 2008	9 March 2011	Fianna Fáil	Overseas development	28th
=== Department of Foreign Affairs and Trade 2011–2020 ===
Name	Term of office		Party	Responsibilities	Government
Jan O'Sullivan	10 March 2011	20 December 2011	Labour	Trade and Development	29th
Lucinda Creighton	10 March 2011	11 July 2013	Fine Gael	European Affairs	29th
Joe Costello	20 December 2011	15 July 2014	Labour	Trade and Development	29th
Paschal Donohoe	12 July 2013	11 July 2014	Fine Gael	European Affairs	29th
Seán Sherlock	15 July 2014	6 May 2016	Labour	Overseas development aid, trade promotion and North–South co-operation	29th
Jimmy Deenihan	15 July 2014	6 May 2016	Fine Gael	Diaspora	29th
Dara Murphy	15 July 2014	6 May 2016	Fine Gael	European Affairs	29th
Dara Murphy	20 May 2016	20 June 2017	Fine Gael	European Affairs	30th
Joe McHugh	19 May 2016	16 June 2017	Fine Gael	Diaspora and overseas development aid	30th
Ciarán Cannon	20 June 2017	27 June 2020	Fine Gael	Diaspora and international development	31st
Helen McEntee	20 June 2017	27 June 2020	Fine Gael	European Affairs	31st
=== Department of Foreign Affairs 2020–2025 ===
Name	Term of office		Party	Responsibilities	Government
Colm Brophy	1 July 2020	17 December 2022	Fine Gael	Overseas development aid and the diaspora	32nd
Thomas Byrne	1 July 2020	17 December 2022	Fianna Fáil	European Affairs	32nd
Peter Burke	21 December 2022	9 April 2024	Fine Gael	European Affairs	33rd
Seán Fleming	21 December 2022	9 April 2024	Fianna Fáil	International development and the diaspora	33rd
Jennifer Carroll MacNeill	9 April 2024	23 January 2025	Fine Gael	European Affairs	34th
Seán Fleming	10 April 2024	23 January 2025	Fianna Fáil	International development and the diaspora	34th
=== Department of Foreign Affairs and Trade 2025–present ===
Name	Term of office		Party	Responsibilities	Government
Thomas Byrne	29 January 2025	Incumbent	Fianna Fáil	European Affairs	35th
Neale Richmond	29 January 2025	Incumbent	Fine Gael	International development and diaspora	35th
