= Tom Kitt (politician) =

Irish former politician (born 1952)

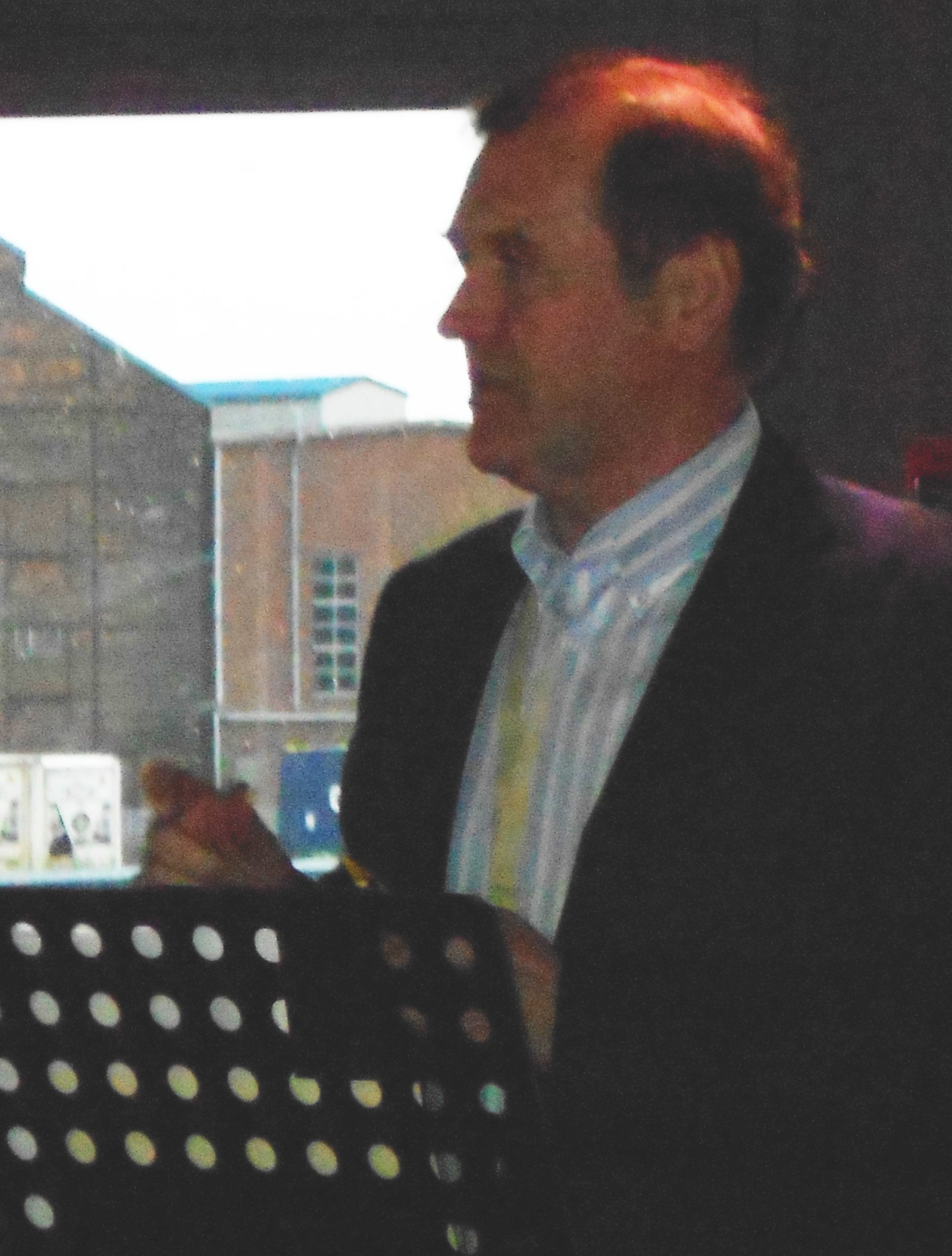
- Kitt in 2012

Minister of State
- 2004–2008: Government Chief Whip
- 2004–2008: Defence
- 2002–2004: Foreign Affairs
- 1997–2002: Enterprise, Trade and Employment
- 1993–1994: Foreign Affairs
- 1992–1994: Taoiseach

Teachta Dála
- In office February 1987 – February 2011
- Constituency: Dublin South

Personal details
- Born: 11 July 1952 (age 74) Galway, Ireland
- Party: Fianna Fáil
- Children: 4, including David
- Parent: Michael F. Kitt (father)
- Relatives: Áine Brady (sister); Michael P. Kitt (brother); Gerry Brady (brother-in-law)
- Education: St Patrick's College, Dublin

Tom Kitt (born 11 July 1952) is an Irish former Fianna Fáil politician. He served as a Teachta Dála (TD) for the Dublin South constituency from 1987 to 2011, and a Minister of State from 1992 to 1994 and from 1997 to 2008.

== Early and private life ==
Tom Kitt was born in Galway and educated at St Jarlath's College, Tuam and St Patrick's College of Education, Dublin. Kitt worked as a primary school teacher before becoming involved in local politics.

Kitt has run several marathons. He completed the Dublin Marathon on five occasions as well as the Berlin Marathon (1991), the Belfast Marathon (1996), the Buckfast marathon (2010) and the 100th Boston Marathon in 1996.

He is a son of Michael F. Kitt, who was a TD for various Galway constituencies (1948–1951 and 1957–1975), and a brother of Michael P. Kitt, a former TD for Galway East. His sister, Áine Brady is a former TD for Kildare North, and his brother-in-law Gerry Brady is a former TD for Kildare. Tom Kitt's sons David, Thomas and Robbie are musicians.

== Political career ==
In 1979, he was elected to Dublin County Council for the local electoral area of Whitechurch, and in 1985 for Dundrum. He was elected to Dáil Éireann at the 1987 general election as a Fianna Fáil TD. He was re-elected at all subsequent general elections until his retirement in 2011.

In February 1992, when Albert Reynolds succeeded as Taoiseach, Kitt was appointed as Minister of State at the Department of the Taoiseach with special responsibility for arts and culture, women's affairs and European affairs. In January 1993, he was appointed as Minister of State at the Department of the Taoiseach with special responsibility for European Affairs and at the Department of Foreign Affairs with special responsibility for European Affairs and Overseas Development Assistance. He served until Fianna Fáil lost office in December 1994.

Under Bertie Ahern he became Fianna Fáil spokesman on Labour Affairs in 1995. After the 1997 general election, Fianna Fáil returned to office and Kitt was appointed by the government as Minister of State at the Department of Enterprise, Trade and Employment with special responsibility for labour affairs, consumer rights and international trade. After the 2002 general election, he was appointed as Minister of State at the Department of Foreign Affairs with responsibility for Overseas Development and Human Rights. In a September 2004 reshuffle, Kitt was appointed as Government Chief Whip and Minister of State at the Department of the Taoiseach and Minister of State at the Department of Defence. He was reappointed after the 2007 general election.

In May 2008, when Brian Cowen became Taoiseach, he was not re-appointed as government chief whip. He declined the offer of another junior ministry, and announced his intention to retire from the Dáil at the following general election, which would take place in February 2011.

== See also ==
- Families in the Oireachtas

Political offices
Preceded by Dermot Ahern; Michael P. Kitt	Minister of State at the Department of the Taoiseach; 1992–1994; With: Noel Dempsey; Noel Treacy (1993–1994)	Succeeded by Seán Barrett; Gay Mitchell; Donal Carey; Avril Doyle
Preceded by Brendan Daly	Minister of State at the Department of Foreign Affairs; 1993–1994	Succeeded by Joan Burton; Gay Mitchell
Preceded by Eithne FitzGerald; Pat Rabbitte as Ministers of State at the Department of Enterprise and Employment	Minister of State at the Department of Enterprise, Trade and Employment; 1997–2002; With: Michael Smith (July–Oct. 1997); Noel Treacy (Oct. 1997–2002)	Succeeded by Michael Ahern; Frank Fahey
Preceded by Liz O'Donnell	Minister of State at the Department of Foreign Affairs; 2002–2004; With: Dick Roche	Succeeded by Noel Treacy; Conor Lenihan
Preceded by Mary Hanafin	Minister of State at the Department of the Taoiseach (Government Chief Whip); 2004–2008	Succeeded by Pat Carey
Preceded by Mary Hanafin	Minister of State at the Department of Defence; 2004–2008	Succeeded by Pat Carey

Dáil	Election	Deputy (Party)	Deputy (Party)	Deputy (Party)	Deputy (Party)	Deputy (Party)	Deputy (Party)	Deputy (Party)
2nd	1921	Thomas Kelly (SF)	Daniel McCarthy (SF)	Constance Markievicz (SF)	Cathal Ó Murchadha (SF)	4 seats 1921–1923		
3rd	1922	Thomas Kelly (PT-SF)	Daniel McCarthy (PT-SF)	William O'Brien (Lab)	Myles Keogh (Ind.)	4 seats 1921–1923		
4th	1923	Philip Cosgrave (CnaG)	Daniel McCarthy (CnaG)	Constance Markievicz (Rep)	Myles Keogh (Ind.)	Cathal Ó Murchadha (Rep)	Michael Hayes (CnaG)	Peadar Doyle (CnaG)
4th	1923 by-election	Philip Cosgrave (CnaG)	Daniel McCarthy (CnaG)	Constance Markievicz (Rep)	Myles Keogh (Ind.)	Cathal Ó Murchadha (Rep)	Hugh Kennedy (CnaG)	Peadar Doyle (CnaG)
4th	March 1924 by-election	James O'Mara (CnaG)	Daniel McCarthy (CnaG)	Constance Markievicz (Rep)	Myles Keogh (Ind.)	Cathal Ó Murchadha (Rep)	Hugh Kennedy (CnaG)	Peadar Doyle (CnaG)
4th	November 1924 by-election	James O'Mara (CnaG)	Daniel McCarthy (CnaG)	Constance Markievicz (Rep)	Myles Keogh (Ind.)	Cathal Ó Murchadha (Rep)	Seán Lemass (SF)	Peadar Doyle (CnaG)
4th	1925 by-election	James O'Mara (CnaG)	Thomas Hennessy (CnaG)	Constance Markievicz (Rep)	Myles Keogh (Ind.)	Cathal Ó Murchadha (Rep)	Seán Lemass (SF)	Peadar Doyle (CnaG)
5th	1927 (Jun)	James Beckett (CnaG)	Vincent Rice (NL)	Constance Markievicz (FF)	Myles Keogh (Ind.)	Thomas Lawlor (Lab)	Seán Lemass (FF)	Peadar Doyle (CnaG)
5th	1927 by-election	James Beckett (CnaG)	Vincent Rice (NL)	Thomas Hennessy (CnaG)	Myles Keogh (Ind.)	Thomas Lawlor (Lab)	Seán Lemass (FF)	Peadar Doyle (CnaG)
6th	1927 (Sep)	James Beckett (CnaG)	Robert Briscoe (FF)	Thomas Hennessy (CnaG)	Myles Keogh (CnaG)	Frank Kerlin (FF)	Seán Lemass (FF)	Peadar Doyle (CnaG)
7th	1932	James Beckett (CnaG)	Robert Briscoe (FF)	Thomas Hennessy (CnaG)	Myles Keogh (CnaG)	James Lynch (FF)	Seán Lemass (FF)	Peadar Doyle (CnaG)
8th	1933	James Beckett (CnaG)	Robert Briscoe (FF)	James McGuire (CnaG)	Thomas Kelly (FF)	James Lynch (FF)	Seán Lemass (FF)	Peadar Doyle (CnaG)
9th	1937	Myles Keogh (FG)	Robert Briscoe (FF)	Thomas Lawlor (Lab)	Thomas Kelly (FF)	Joseph Hannigan (Ind.)	Seán Lemass (FF)	Peadar Doyle (FG)
10th	1938	James Beckett (FG)	Robert Briscoe (FF)	James Lynch (FF)	Thomas Kelly (FF)	Joseph Hannigan (Ind.)	Seán Lemass (FF)	Peadar Doyle (FG)
10th	1939 by-election	John McCann (FF)	Robert Briscoe (FF)	James Lynch (FF)	Thomas Kelly (FF)	Joseph Hannigan (Ind.)	Seán Lemass (FF)	Peadar Doyle (FG)
11th	1943	Maurice Dockrell (FG)	Robert Briscoe (FF)	James Lynch (FF)	James Larkin Jnr (Lab)	John McCann (FF)	Seán Lemass (FF)	Peadar Doyle (FG)
12th	1944	Maurice Dockrell (FG)	Robert Briscoe (FF)	James Lynch (FF)	James Larkin Jnr (Lab)	John McCann (FF)	Seán Lemass (FF)	Peadar Doyle (FG)
13th	1948	Constituency abolished. See Dublin South-Central, Dublin South-East and Dublin South-West.						

Dáil	Election	Deputy (Party)	Deputy (Party)	Deputy (Party)	Deputy (Party)	Deputy (Party)
22nd	1981	Niall Andrews (FF)	Séamus Brennan (FF)	Nuala Fennell (FG)	John Kelly (FG)	Alan Shatter (FG)
23rd	1982 (Feb)	Niall Andrews (FF)	Séamus Brennan (FF)	Nuala Fennell (FG)	John Kelly (FG)	Alan Shatter (FG)
24th	1982 (Nov)	Niall Andrews (FF)	Séamus Brennan (FF)	Nuala Fennell (FG)	John Kelly (FG)	Alan Shatter (FG)
25th	1987	Tom Kitt (FF)	Séamus Brennan (FF)	Anne Colley (PDs)	John Kelly (FG)	Alan Shatter (FG)
26th	1989	Tom Kitt (FF)	Séamus Brennan (FF)	Nuala Fennell (FG)	Roger Garland (GP)	Alan Shatter (FG)
27th	1992	Tom Kitt (FF)	Séamus Brennan (FF)	Liz O'Donnell (PDs)	Eithne FitzGerald (Lab)	Alan Shatter (FG)
28th	1997	Tom Kitt (FF)	Séamus Brennan (FF)	Liz O'Donnell (PDs)	Olivia Mitchell (FG)	Alan Shatter (FG)
29th	2002	Tom Kitt (FF)	Séamus Brennan (FF)	Liz O'Donnell (PDs)	Olivia Mitchell (FG)	Eamon Ryan (GP)
30th	2007	Tom Kitt (FF)	Séamus Brennan (FF)	Alan Shatter (FG)	Olivia Mitchell (FG)	Eamon Ryan (GP)
30th	2009 by-election	Tom Kitt (FF)	George Lee (FG)	Alan Shatter (FG)	Olivia Mitchell (FG)	Eamon Ryan (GP)
31st	2011	Shane Ross (Ind.)	Peter Mathews (FG)	Alan Shatter (FG)	Olivia Mitchell (FG)	Alex White (Lab)
32nd	2016	Constituency abolished. See Dublin Rathdown, Dublin South-West and Dún Laoghaire.				
