= Paul Connaughton Snr =

Irish former politician (born 1944)

Minister of State
- 1982–1987: Agriculture

Teachta Dála
- In office June 1981 – February 2011
- Constituency: Galway East

Senator
- In office 27 October 1977 – 11 June 1981
- Constituency: Agricultural Panel

Personal details
- Born: 6 June 1944 (age 82) Mountbellew, County Galway, Ireland
- Party: Fine Gael
- Children: 4, including Paul
- Education: Mountbellew Agricultural College

Paul Connaughton Snr (born 6 June 1944) is an Irish former Fine Gael politician who served as Minister of State for Land Structure and Development from 1982 to 1987. He served as a Teachta Dála (TD) for the Galway East constituency from 1981 to 2011. He also served as a Senator for the Agricultural Panel from 1977 to 1981.

Connaughton was born in Mountbellew, County Galway. He was educated at St. Jarlath's Vocational School, Mountbellew, and Mountbellew Agricultural College where he did an IMI Management Course. Connaughton first held political office in 1979, when he became a member of Galway County Council. He served on that authority on two occasions between 1979 and 1985, and again from 1991 to 2003.

He was an unsuccessful candidate at the 1975 Galway North-East by-election and the 1977 general election. He was elected to Seanad Éireann as a Senator for the Agricultural Panel in 1977. Connaughton was first elected to Dáil Éireann at the 1981 general election as a Fine Gael TD for Galway East, and was returned at every subsequent election until his retirement in 2011. Between 1982 and 1987, Fine Gael were in government and Connaughton served as Minister of State at the Department of Agriculture with special responsibility for Land Structure and Development. Following the parties return to opposition, he was Fine Gael Spokesperson on Energy and Western Development and Chairman of the Political Affairs Committee between 1993 and 1997.

Between 1997 and 2000, he was Spokesman on Agriculture and Food. He was Fine Gael front bench Spokesperson on Marine, Natural Resources and Energy from June 2000 to February 2001. In Enda Kenny's Front Bench reshuffle in 2004 Connaughton became Spokesperson on Regional Development and Regional Affairs. He has also served as spokesman on a range of portfolios including Agriculture; Social Welfare; Defence and Tourism; and Older People during his political career.

His daughter Sinead Connaughton was a member of Galway County Council representing the Tuam local electoral area from 2003 to 2009. His son Paul Connaughton Jnr was elected to Galway County Council at the 2009 local elections representing the Ballinasloe local electoral area.

He was party Deputy spokesperson on Foreign Affairs with special responsibility for the Irish diaspora from 2010 to 2011.

He retired from politics at the 2011 general election. His son Paul Connaughton Jnr served as a Fine Gael TD for Galway East from 2011 to 2016.

Dáil	Election	Deputy (Party)	Deputy (Party)	Deputy (Party)	Deputy (Party)
9th	1937	Frank Fahy (FF)	Mark Killilea Snr (FF)	Patrick Beegan (FF)	Seán Broderick (FG)
10th	1938	Frank Fahy (FF)	Mark Killilea Snr (FF)	Patrick Beegan (FF)	Seán Broderick (FG)
11th	1943	Frank Fahy (FF)	Mark Killilea Snr (FF)	Patrick Beegan (FF)	Michael Donnellan (CnaT)
12th	1944	Frank Fahy (FF)	Mark Killilea Snr (FF)	Patrick Beegan (FF)	Michael Donnellan (CnaT)
13th	1948	Constituency abolished. See Galway North and Galway South			

Dáil	Election	Deputy (Party)	Deputy (Party)	Deputy (Party)	Deputy (Party)	Deputy (Party)
17th	1961	Michael F. Kitt (FF)	Anthony Millar (FF)	Michael Carty (FF)	Michael Donnellan (CnaT)	Brigid Hogan-O'Higgins (FG)
17th	1964 by-election	Michael F. Kitt (FF)	Anthony Millar (FF)	Michael Carty (FF)	John Donnellan (FG)	Brigid Hogan-O'Higgins (FG)
18th	1965	Michael F. Kitt (FF)	Anthony Millar (FF)	Michael Carty (FF)	John Donnellan (FG)	Brigid Hogan-O'Higgins (FG)
19th	1969	Constituency abolished. See Galway North-East and Clare–South Galway				

Dáil	Election	Deputy (Party)	Deputy (Party)	Deputy (Party)	Deputy (Party)
21st	1977	Johnny Callanan (FF)	Thomas Hussey (FF)	Mark Killilea Jnr (FF)	John Donnellan (FG)
22nd	1981	Johnny Callanan (FF)	Michael P. Kitt (FF)	Paul Connaughton Snr (FG)	3 seats 1981–1997
23rd	1982 (Feb)	Johnny Callanan (FF)	Michael P. Kitt (FF)	Paul Connaughton Snr (FG)	3 seats 1981–1997
23rd	1982 by-election	Noel Treacy (FF)	Michael P. Kitt (FF)	Paul Connaughton Snr (FG)	3 seats 1981–1997
24th	1982 (Nov)	Noel Treacy (FF)	Michael P. Kitt (FF)	Paul Connaughton Snr (FG)	3 seats 1981–1997
25th	1987	Noel Treacy (FF)	Michael P. Kitt (FF)	Paul Connaughton Snr (FG)	3 seats 1981–1997
26th	1989	Noel Treacy (FF)	Michael P. Kitt (FF)	Paul Connaughton Snr (FG)	3 seats 1981–1997
27th	1992	Noel Treacy (FF)	Michael P. Kitt (FF)	Paul Connaughton Snr (FG)	3 seats 1981–1997
28th	1997	Noel Treacy (FF)	Michael P. Kitt (FF)	Paul Connaughton Snr (FG)	Ulick Burke (FG)
29th	2002	Noel Treacy (FF)	Joe Callanan (FF)	Paul Connaughton Snr (FG)	Paddy McHugh (Ind.)
30th	2007	Noel Treacy (FF)	Michael P. Kitt (FF)	Paul Connaughton Snr (FG)	Ulick Burke (FG)
31st	2011	Colm Keaveney (Lab)	Michael P. Kitt (FF)	Ciarán Cannon (FG)	Paul Connaughton Jnr (FG)
32nd	2016	Seán Canney (Ind.)	Anne Rabbitte (FF)	Ciarán Cannon (FG)	3 seats 2016–2024
33rd	2020	Seán Canney (Ind.)	Anne Rabbitte (FF)	Ciarán Cannon (FG)	3 seats 2016–2024
34th	2024	Seán Canney (Ind.)	Albert Dolan (FF)	Peter Roche (FG)	Louis O'Hara (SF)
