= Mountbellew =

Town in County Galway, Connacht, Ireland

Mountbellew An Creagán (Irish)
- Town
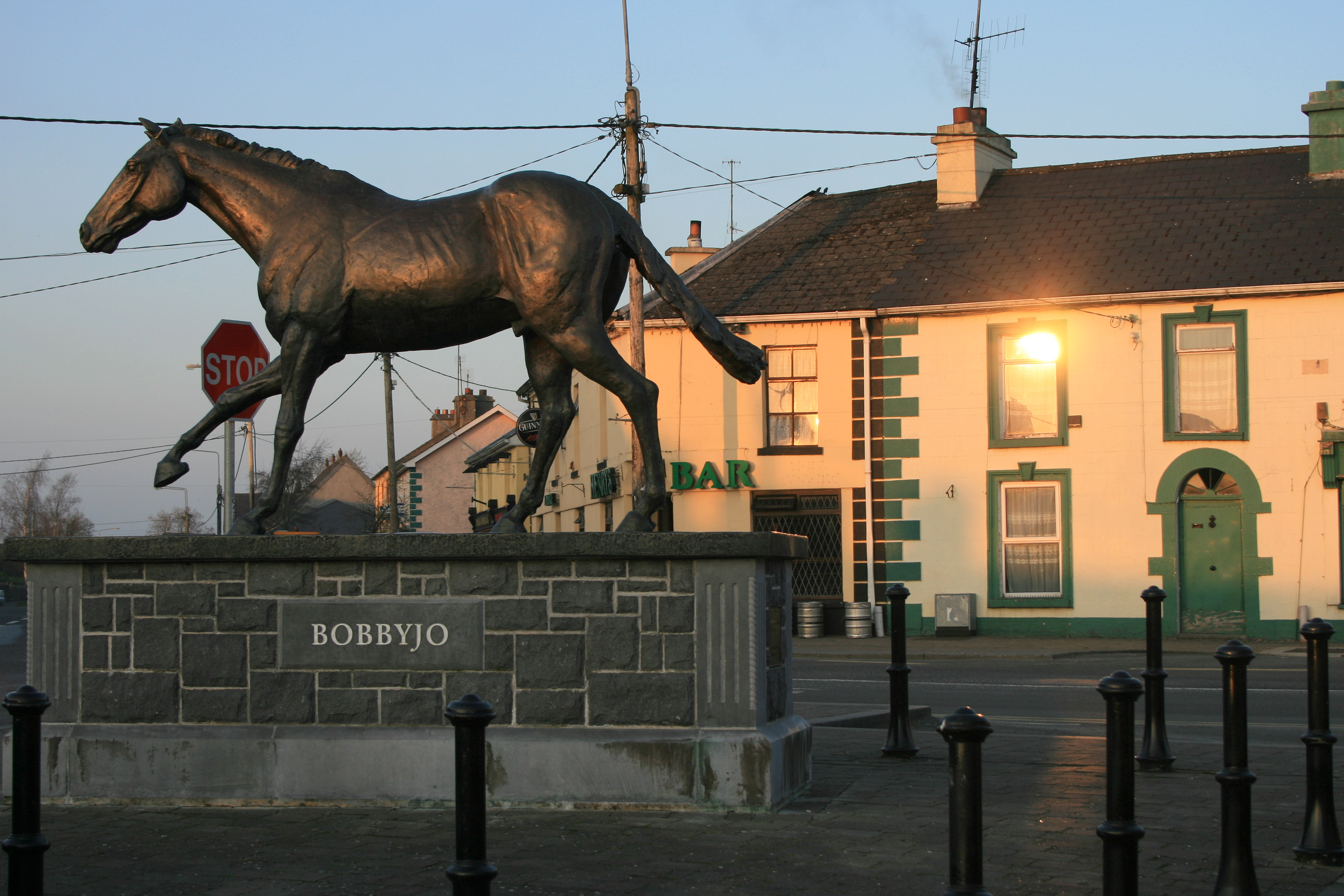
- Statue of Bobbyjo, Mountbellew

- Location in Ireland
- Coordinates: 53.47°N 8.50°W
- Country: Ireland
- Province: Connacht
- County: County Galway
- Dáil Éireann: Galway East
- Elevation: 44 m (144 ft)

Population (2022)
  - Total: 774
- Time zone: UTC±0 (WET)
  - Summer (DST): UTC+1 (IST)
- Eircode routing key: H53
- Telephone area code: +353(0)91

Mountbellew or Mountbellew Bridge (historically Creggaun, from Irish: an Creagán, meaning 'the rocky place') is a town in County Galway, Ireland. It lies mostly within the townland of Treanrevagh (Trian Riabhach) on the N63 national primary road. As of the 2022 census, it had a population of 774.

== Amenities ==
Mountbellew has a number of shops and small businesses. There are four schools located in the town: St. Mary's National School; two secondary schools, Holy Rosary College and Coláiste an Chreagáin; and the Franciscan Brothers Agricultural College, part of the Atlantic Technological University.

The local secondary school "Holy Rosary College Mountbellew" is home to an All Weather sports facility that was originally built in 2017 with the intention of renting it out to various third parties, especially during the winter in aid of raising money for the school. However, An Bord Pleanala ruled that the floodlighting of the facility should not be in operation any later than 7:30 PM. It was also ruled that the use of this facility could only be used for school purposes and was not to be rented out to third parties. This came after fierce complaints by the residents of the local estate, these complaints mostly regarded the light pollution and the noise such a facility would have on the estate which was only 30 yards from the sports facility.

Points of interest in the area include the Bellew Estate and woodlands, the man-made pleasure lake, the old forge, the malt house (which now lends its name to a restaurant) and St Mary's Catholic church. The Bellew Estate was once the home of the Grattan-Bellew family, who were Galway parliamentarians during the 18th and 19th centuries. The estate demesne is now a wooded area of forest walks and picnic areas. The village bridge has a milestone inserted in the middle of its parapet.

In 2020, the local authorities and The Galway County Council had approved the building of a supermarket and filling station. The site was planned to be built upon by Cahermorris Developments Ltd. However, the building of the supermarket and filling station was appealed to An Bord Pleanala by a number of residents who were living in close proximity to where the new site was scheduled to be built. Reasons stated in objection to the building included that were would be "Chiller Fans" within 50 meters of residential property, the delivery bay of the supermarket would generate "intolerable noise" at all hours of the day and that such a large discount supermarket would not be sustainable for the local business and economy of the small village. In the end it was deemed that “The entire development is completely incompatible with this village and would have a detrimental effect on the location."

In 2021, the discount supermarket chain Aldi announced the opening of a new 7 million Euro store in Mountbellew.

The local drapery shop, Briggs Drapers, is a very important amenity to the village. It is run by Peter Briggs, who has worked behind the counter at the shop for over 60 years. Peter is often found up at 7 AM servicing the community by providing breakfasts for many residents, including students of the nearby Agricultural College. Peter has worked at the drapery shop since 1952.

== Franciscan Brothers ==
The Franciscan Brothers, a Catholic religious order, came to Mountbellew from Milltown, Dublin, in 1818. The Bellew family invited them and gave them resources of land and a house to get established. The order ran a free primary school until 1884. In 1875, they opened a secondary school (boarding), and in 1898, a special department in the school was set up to prepare students for teacher training colleges.

The order changed from secondary education to agricultural education in 1904, and the Franciscan Brothers’ Agricultural College was founded. This was the first agricultural college in Ireland. In 1986, the college partnered with a predecessor of Galway-Mayo Institute of Technology (GMIT). This cooperation between the two colleges resulted in the setting up of what is now known as the Higher Certificate in Business Studies (Agribusiness).

The Atlantic Technological University, formed via the merger of Galway-Mayo IT, IT Sligo, and Letterkenny IT in April 2022, has eight campuses across four counties, including one in Mountbellew.

== Sport and community ==
Mountbellew's sporting societies include Mountbellew Moylough GAA club, which plays both hurling and Gaelic football. The club colours are black and amber, and they play on Mountbellew/Moylough GAA grounds. The senior football team won five Galway Senior Football Championships in 1964, 1965, 1974, 1986 and 2021.

A monument to the racehorse Bobbyjo can be seen in the town centre. He won the Irish and English grand nationals.

A historic market, promoted by local landlord Christopher Dillon Bellew in the 19th century, still takes place in the triangular 'square' every Tuesday. The historic weigh-house building is still located across from the square, becoming a garage in the 1900s, and it is now being redeveloped.

Mountbellew in combination with nearby town Moylough are part of the Irish/French town twinning program which links the two parishes both legally and socially with the French town of Eliant.

== Notable people ==
- Thomas J. Kelly (1833–1908), leader of the Irish Republican Brotherhood
- James Lawlor Kiernan (1837–1869), Brigadier General in the Union Army during the American Civil War, was born in Mountbellew
- Niamh Kilkenny, sportsperson and All Ireland Camogie Championship winner, attended school locally.

== See also ==
- List of towns and villages in Ireland
