= 2019 Galway County Council election =

Part of the 2019 Irish local elections

- 24 May 2019

All 39 seats on Galway County Council 20 seats needed for a majority
	First party	Second party	Third party
Party	Fianna Fáil	Fine Gael	Sinn Féin
Seats won	15	11	1
Seat change	▲3	▼1	▼2
	Fourth party	Fifth party	Sixth party
Party	Green	Republican Sinn Féin	Independent
Seats won	1	1 (Note: Republican Sinn Féin is not a registered party, so its name is not used on ballot papers or in council proceedings.)	10
Seat change	▲1	Steady	▼1
- Results by local electoral area

An election to all 39 seats on Galway County Council was held on 24 May 2019 as part of the 2019 Irish local elections. County Galway was divided into 7 local electoral areas (LEAs) to elect councillors for a five-year term of office on the electoral system of proportional representation by means of the single transferable vote (PR-STV).

== Boundary changes ==
Following a recommendation of the 2018 Boundary Committee, the boundaries of the LEAs were altered from those used in the 2014 elections. Its terms of reference required no change in the total number of councillors but set a maximum LEA size of seven councillors, which three of the 2014 LEAs exceeded. Other changes were necessitated by population shifts revealed by the 2016 census.

== Overview ==
Fianna Fáil had a very good election, winning 3 additional seats and increasing their vote by over 5%. Fine Gael lost a seat to fall to 11 but also increased their vote. The Greens gained 1 seat in Conamara and Republican Sinn Féin retained their single seat. Sinn Féin lost 2 seats to be reduced to just 1 member. However, Gabe Cronelly who had quit the party since 2014 was re-elected as an independent.

== Results by party ==
Party	Seats	±	1st pref	FPv%	±%
Fianna Fáil	15	▲3	25,369	32.80	▲5.40
Fine Gael	11	▼1	23,869	30.86	▲3.26
Sinn Féin	1	▼2	3,721	4.81	▼2.69
Green	1	▲1	1,482	1.92	New
Republican Sinn Féin	1	Steady	971	1.26	▼0.14
Aontú	0	Steady	1,128	1.46	New
Renua	0	Steady	505	0.65	New
Inds. 4 Change	0	Steady	429	0.55	New
Social Democrats	0	Steady	407	0.53	New
Labour	0	Steady	206	0.27	▼3.23
Independent	10	▼1	19,262	24.90	▼4.50
Total	39	Steady	77,349	100.00	

== Results by local electoral area ==
*: Outgoing councillor elected in 2014.
†: Outgoing councillor coopted subsequent to the 2014 election.

=== Athenry–Oranmore ===
Athenry–Oranmore: 7 seats
Party	Candidate	FPv%	Count									
Party	Candidate	FPv%	1	2	3	4	5	6	7	8	9	10
Independent	James Charity	14.32%	1,792									
Fianna Fáil	Albert Dolan	13.74%	1,720									
Independent	Jim Cuddy	11.64%	1,457	1,530	1,540	1,630						
Independent	Gabe Cronnelly	9.80%	1,226	1,235	1,253	1,280	1,289	1,418	1,512	1,547	1,800	
Fine Gael	David Collins	9.29%	1,163	1,182	1,203	1,216	1,219	1,250	1,295	1,413	1,560	1,596
Fine Gael	Liam Carroll	7.07%	885	899	904	926	926	956	1,003	1,041	1,186	1,224
Fianna Fáil	Michael Hannon	6.02%	753	785	810	820	830	853	864			
Fianna Fáil	Shelly Herterich Quinn	5.95%	745	750	788	820	824	853	916	1,141	1,326	1,404
Fine Gael	Helen Jennings	5.86%	734	738	749	792	793	842	910	933		
Independent	Josette Farrell	5.17%	647	664	667	696	710	750	886	1,105	1,138	1,148
Sinn Féin	Louis O'Hara	4.05%	507	519	535	555	556					
Green	Kenneth Keavey	3.97%	497	528	532	591	595	679				
Labour	Marian Spelman	1.65%	206	213	216							
Renua	Amanda McManus	1.46%	183	187	188							
Electorate: 23,796 Valid: 12,515 Spoilt: 202 Quota: 1,565 Turnout: 12,717 (53.44%)

=== Ballinasloe ===
Ballinasloe: 6 seats
Party	Candidate	FPv%	Count							
Party	Candidate	FPv%	1	2	3	4	5	6	7	8
Independent	Tim Broderick	17.83%	2,362							
Fianna Fáil	Michael Connolly	16.36%	2,168							
Fine Gael	Peter Keaveney	12.32%	1,632	1,651	1,691	1,698	1,794	1,807	1,831	1,898
Independent	Declan Geraghty	11.63%	1,541	1,580	1,626	1,637	1,722	1,741	1,778	1,808
Sinn Féin	Dermot Connolly	10.47%	1,387	1,500	1,519	1,603	1,614	1,748	1,932	
Independent	Aisling Dolan (Note: See change below.)	8.17%	1,082	1,142	1,160	1,259	1,275	1,422	1,571	1,841
Fine Gael	Aidan Donohue	6.38%	845	944	980	1,001	1,022	1,059	1,090	1,352
Fine Gael	Michael Finnerty	5.26%	697	720	733	749	752	784	875	
Fianna Fáil	Mike Kelly	3.86%	511	536	575	609	693	724		
Social Democrats	Ken Campbell	3.07%	407	446	456	496	498			
Independent	Harriett Bruce	2.35%	311	344	354					
Fianna Fáil	Kenneth O'Brien	2.32%	308	326	369	374				
Electorate: 23,513 Valid: 13,251 Spoilt: 211 Quota: 1,894 Turnout: 13,462 (57.25%)

=== Conamara North ===
Conamara North: 4 seats
Party	Candidate	FPv%	Count				
Party	Candidate	FPv%	1	2	3	4	5
Independent	Thomas Welby	29.42%	2,140				
Fine Gael	Eileen Mannion	19.25%	1,400	1,590			
Fianna Fáil	Gerry King	18.56%	1,350	1,437	1,464		
Fianna Fáil	Seamus Walsh	13.91%	1,012	1,281	1,312	1,363	1,467
Independent	Josie Conneely	8.59%	625	668	696	749	984
Sinn Féin	Tom Healy	8.02%	583	644	663	705	
Independent	Críostóir Breathnach	2.24%	163	198	212		
Electorate: 13,633 Valid: 7,273 Spoilt: 142 Quota: 1,455 Turnout: 7,415 (54.39%)

=== Conamara South ===
Conamara South: 5 seats
Party	Candidate	FPv%	Count			
Party	Candidate	FPv%	1	2	3	4
Fine Gael	Padraig Mac An Iomaire	15.71%	1,408	1,472	1,535	
Fianna Fáil	Noel Thomas	13.51%	1,211	1,244	1,327	1,515
Fianna Fáil	Dáithí Ó Cualáin	13.01%	1,166	1,250	1,324	1,408
Fianna Fáil	Máirtín Lee	11.34%	1,016	1,056	1,124	1,207
Green	Alastair McKinstry	10.99%	985	1,117	1,216	1,436
Republican Sinn Féin	Tomás Ó Curraoin	10.84%	971	1,117	1,268	1,396
Fine Gael	Ann Flaherty	9.73%	872	904	992	
Fianna Fáil	MacDara Hosty	7.57%	678	694		
Sinn Féin	Kevin O'Hara	5.68%	509			
Independent	Críostóir Breathnach	1.26%	113			
Independent	Patrick Feeney	0.36%	32			
Electorate: 18,232 Valid: 8,961 Spoilt: 203 Quota: 1,494 Turnout: 9,164 (50.26%)

Tomás Ó Curraoin appeared on the ballot as an independent (non-party) but is a member of Republican Sinn Féin and is the sole public representative of that party.

=== Gort–Kinvara ===
Gort–Kinvara: 5 seats
Party	Candidate	FPv%	Count							
Party	Candidate	FPv%	1	2	3	4	5	6	7	8
Fine Gael	Joe Byrne	27.08%	2,751							
Fine Gael	P. J. Murphy	15.90%	1,615	1,896						
Fianna Fáil	Martina Kinane	14.56%	1,479	1,555	1,569	1,619	1,631	1,680	1,736	
Fianna Fáil	Gerry Finnerty	8.05%	818	968	996	1,016	1,141	1,153	1,261	1,354
Fianna Fáil	Kevin Fahey	7.99%	812	921	935	960	1,036	1,054	1,162	1,275
Fine Gael	Fionn Kiely	5.88%	597	736	820	846	873	940	994	
Independent	Geraldine Donohue	5.29%	537	623	642	690	777	909	1,095	1,328
Inds. 4 Change	Cormac MacGowan	4.22%	429	461	466	515	546			
Independent	Hubert Geoghegan	4.01%	407	481	495	557	616	702		
Independent	Declan Diviney	3.84%	390	463	474	501				
Renua	Emma O'Connell	3.17%	322	360	374					
Electorate: 17,335 Valid: 10,157 Spoilt: 178 Quota: 1,693 Turnout: 10,335 (59.62%)

=== Loughrea ===
Loughrea: 5 seats
Party	Candidate	FPv%	Count							
Party	Candidate	FPv%	1	2	3	4	5	6	7	8
Fine Gael	Michael 'Moegie' Maher	20.82%	2,152							
Fine Gael	Jimmy McClearn	19.74%	2,041							
Fianna Fáil	Shane Curley	15.29%	1,581	1,742						
Fianna Fáil	Ivan Canning	15.13%	1,564	1,589	1,747					
Independent	Pat Hynes	9.17%	948	1,052	1,101	1,105	1,111	1,190	1,339	1,560
Fianna Fáil	Pat Flanagan	7.14%	738	814	840	845	853	889	942	1,128
Aontú	Joe Campbell	6.39%	661	674	727	736	737	774	847	
Sinn Féin	Annemarie Roche	3.21%	332	353	375	378	379	467		
Independent	Eoin Madden	3.11%	321	349	358	360	362			
Electorate: 18,729 Valid: 10,338 Spoilt: 165 Quota: 1,724 Turnout: 10,503 (56.08%)

=== Tuam ===
Tuam: 7 seats
Party	Candidate	FPv%	Count						
Party	Candidate	FPv%	1	2	3	4	5	6	7
Fine Gael	Peter Roche	16.36%	2,430						
Fianna Fáil	Joe Sheridan	10.39%	1,544	1,588	1,602	1,649	1,726	1,841	1,846
Fianna Fáil	Donagh Mark Killilea	10.24%	1,521	1,607	1,636	1,698	1,893		
Fianna Fáil	Mary Hoade	9.80%	1,455	1,487	1,492	1,529	1,553	1,840	1,841
Fine Gael	Andrew Reddington	9.35%	1,389	1,449	1,454	1,512	1,533	1,689	1,690
Fine Gael	Tom McHugh	8.47%	1,258	1,376	1,394	1,442	1,509	1,676	1,680
Fianna Fáil	Colm Keaveney	8.21%	1,219	1,271	1,297	1,458	1,630	1,754	1,761
Independent	Billy Connelly	7.53%	1,118	1,152	1,165	1,253	1,298		
Independent	Karey McHugh	6.25%	929	1,020	1,067	1,242	1,571	1,806	1,824
Independent	Shaun Cunniffe	5.80%	862	886	935	1,036			
Aontú	Martin Ward	3.14%	467	477	491				
Sinn Féin	Stíofán De Lundres Ó Dálaigh	2.71%	403	414	438				
Independent	Thomas (T.P.) Niland	1.62%	241	251					
Independent	Dermot Ryan	0.12%	18	19					
Electorate: 25,125 Valid: 14,854 Spoilt: 213 Quota: 1,857 Turnout: 15,067 (59.97%)

== Results by gender ==
2019 Galway County Council election Candidates by gender
Gender	Number of candidates	% of candidates	Elected councillors	% of councillors
Men	63	80.8%	32	82.1%
Women	15	19.2%	7	17.9%
TOTAL	78		39	

== Changes ==
=== Changes in affiliation ===
Name	LEA	Elected as	New affiliation	Date
Aisling Dolan	Ballinasloe	Independent	Fine Gael	November 2019
Declan Geraghty	Ballinasloe	Independent	Independent Ireland	February 2024
Declan Kelly	Loughrea	Independent	Independent Ireland	March 2024
Noel Thomas	Connemara South	Fianna Fáil	Independent	March 2024
Séamus Walsh	Connemara North	Fianna Fáil	Independent	March 2024
Noel Thomas	Connemara South	Independent	Independent Ireland	April 2024
Séamus Walsh	Connemara North	Independent	Independent Ireland	April 2024
Liam Carroll	Athenry–Oranmore	Fine Gael	Independent	May 2024

=== Co-options ===
Party	Outgoing	LEA	Reason	Date	Co-optee
Fine Gael	Aisling Dolan	Ballinasloe	Nominated by the Taoiseach to the 26th Seanad	June 2020	Evelyn Francis Parsons
Independent	Pat Hynes	Loughrea	Retirement	November 2021	Declan Kelly

== Sources ==
- "Galway County Council - Local Election candidates". RTÉ. 13 May 2019.
- "Local Elections 2019: Results, Transfer of Votes and Statistics" (PDF). Government of Ireland. Department of Housing, Planning and Local Government (DHPLG). pp. 112–118.
