= 2024 Galway County Council election =

Part of the 2024 Irish local elections

- 7 June 2024

All 39 seats on Galway County Council 20 seats needed for a majority
	First party	Second party	Third party
Party	Fine Gael	Fianna Fáil	Independent Ireland
Last election	11	15	Did not exist
Seats won	13	11	6
Seat change	▲2	▼4	▲6
	Fourth party	Fifth party	Sixth party
Party	Sinn Féin	Republican Sinn Féin	Green
Last election	1	1	1
Seats won	2	1	0
Seat change	▲1	Steady	▼1
	Seventh party
Party	Independent
Last election	10
Seats won	6
Seat change	▼4
- Results by Local Electoral Area

An election to all 39 seats on Galway County Council was held on 7 June 2024, as part of the 2024 Irish local elections. County Galway is divided into 7 local electoral areas (LEAs) to elect councillors for a five-year term of office on the electoral system of proportional representation by means of the single transferable vote (PR-STV).

== Results by party ==
Party	Candidates	Seats	±	First Pref. votes	FPv%	±%
Fine Gael	14	13	▲2	23,430	29.43	▼1.43
Fianna Fáil	17	11	▼4	21,719	27.28	▼5.52
Independent Ireland	7	6	New	9,549	11.99	New
Sinn Féin	9	2	▲1	6,252	7.85	▲3.04
Republican Sinn Féin	1	1	Steady	974	1.22	▼0.04
Green	6	0	▼1	2,575	3.23	▲1.31
The Irish People	5	0	New	896	1.13	New
Labour	2	0	Steady	615	0.77	▲0.50
Aontú	1	0	Steady	553	0.69	▼0.77
People Before Profit	1	0	New	364	0.46	New
National Party	1	0	New	149	0.19	New
Irish Freedom	1	0	New	122	0.15	New
Independent	14	6	▼4	12,425	15.60	▼9.30
Totals	79	39	Steady	79,623	100.00	

== Incumbents retiring ==
Constituency	Councillor	Party
Ballinasloe	Tim Broderick	Independent
Athenry–Oranmore	Jim Cuddy	Independent
Tuam	Colm Keaveney	Fianna Fáil

== Results by local electoral area ==
*: Outgoing councillor elected in 2019.
†: Outgoing councillor coopted subsequent to the 2019 election.

=== Athenry–Oranmore ===
Athenry–Oranmore: 7 seats
Party	Candidate	FPv%	Count									
Party	Candidate	FPv%	1	2	3	4	5	6	7	8	9	10
Fianna Fáil	Albert Dolan	17.4%	2,393									
Independent	Tomás Grealish	13.4%	1,843									
Fine Gael	David Collins	11.5%	1,586	1,683	1,705	1,714	1,732					
Independent	James Charity	11.4%	1,565	1,588	1,614	1,666	1,697	1,837				
Fine Gael	Peter Feeney	8.8%	1,213	1,338	1,342	1,350	1,362	1,403	1,493	1,501	1,910	
Fine Gael	Eoghan Gallagher	7.4%	1,018	1,078	1,105	1,112	1,178	1,187	1,313	1,317	1,402	1,463
Sinn Féin	Louis O'Hara	7.3%	1,005	1,073	1,080	1,102	1,150	1,188	1,327	1,342	1,512	1,592
Fianna Fáil	Cillian Keane	6.8%	937	1,005	1,025	1,026	1,101	1,116	1,163	1,168	1,431	1,482
Fianna Fáil	Shelly Herterich Quinn	5.8%	792	956	962	972	1,000	1,029	1,114	1,118		
Green	Eoin Madden	3.3%	454	475	477	478	597	608				
Labour	Fergal Landy	3.0%	409	415	418	420						
Independent Ireland	Sean Hehir	2.2%	301	337	342	434	437					
The Irish People	Maria Carr	1.6%	226	233	236							
Electorate: 26,073 Valid: 13,742 Spoilt: 135 Quota: 1,718 Turnout: 13,877 (53.2%)

=== Ballinasloe ===
Ballinasloe: 6 seats
Party	Candidate	FPv%	Count	
Party	Candidate	FPv%	1	2
Fianna Fáil	Michael Connolly	19.38%	2,410	
Independent Ireland	Declan Geraghty	18.19%	2,262	
Independent	Evelyn Parsons	16.53%	2,055	
Fine Gael	Alan Harney	14.35%	1,784	
Sinn Féin	Dermot Connolly	14.22%	1,768	1,925
Fine Gael	Peter Keaveney	12.56%	1,561	1,953
PBP–Solidarity	Andrew Mannion	2.93%	364	397
Sinn Féin	Regan Maher	1.84%	229	280
Electorate: 26,074 Valid: 12,433 Spoilt: 134 Quota: 1,777 Turnout: 12,567 (48.20%)

=== Conamara North ===
Conamara North: 4 seats
Party	Candidate	FPv%	Count			
Party	Candidate	FPv%	1	2	3	4
Independent	Thomas Welby	22.10%	1,758			
Independent Ireland	Séamus Walsh	19.17%	1,525	1,598		
Fianna Fáil	Gerard King	18.04%	1,435	1,456	1,496	1,663
Fine Gael	Eileen Mannion	17.92%	1,425	1,463	1,572	1,684
Independent	Mánus Ó Conaire	11.38%	905	920	973	1,117
Sinn Féin	Tom Healy	7.43%	591	600	671	
Green	Daniel Gleeson	3.12%	248	255		
Independent	Críostóir Breathnach	0.84%	67	71		
Electorate: 14,650 Valid: 7,954 Spoilt: 97 Quota: 1,591 Turnout: 8,051 (54.96%)

=== Conamara South ===
Conamara South: 5 seats
Party	Candidate	FPv%	Count									
Party	Candidate	FPv%	1	2	3	4	5	6	7	8	9	10
Independent Ireland	Noel Thomas	15.96%	1,569	1,633	1,648							
Fine Gael	Padraig Mac An Iomaire	13.73%	1,350	1,359	1,422	1,425	1,463	1,511	1,585	1,751		
Republican Sinn Féin	Tomás Ó Curraoin	9.91%	974	1,003	1,043	1,043	1,090	1,146	1,278	1,383	1,402	1,596
Fianna Fáil	Daragh Ó Tuairisg	8.65%	850	862	868	868	921	935	966	1,150	1,191	1,346
Fianna Fáil	Mairtin Lee	8.28%	814	818	904	904	910	974	1,033	1,061	1,078	1,372
Fianna Fáil	Dáithí O Cualáin	7.77%	764	772	825	826	844	879	953	1,028	1,056	
Independent Ireland	Michael Leainde	7.20%	708	736	814	816	838	978	1,097	1,127	1,131	1,379
Sinn Féin	Kevin O’Hara	6.74%	663	675	689	690	738	777				
Green	Alistair McKinstry	6.34%	623	627	631	631	797	814	927			
Independent	Sinead O'Brien	4.43%	435	461	470	470						
Independent	PJ Ó Flatharta	4.30%	423	442	479	481	509					
Independent	Michael Curran	4.07%	400	417								
Irish Freedom	Doran McMahon	1.24%	122									
The Irish People	Aidan Walsh	0.60%	59									
Independent	Geri Slevin	0.44%	43									
Independent	Críostóir Breathnach	0.34%	33									
Electorate: 19,718 Valid: 9,830 Spoilt: 141 Quota: 1,639 Turnout: 9,971 (50.57%)

=== Gort–Kinvara ===
Gort–Kinvara: 5 seats
Party	Candidate	FPv%	Count				
Party	Candidate	FPv%	1	2	3	4	5
Fine Gael	P. J. Murphy	19.64%	1,953				
Fianna Fáil	Martina Kinane	18.95%	1,884				
Independent	Geraldine Donohue	17.71%	1,761				
Fine Gael	Paul Killilea	15.47%	1,538	1,717			
Fianna Fáil	Gerry Finnerty	12.32%	1,225	1,301	1,415	1,456	1,585
Green	Megan Flynn Dixon	7.66%	762	781	852	861	1,057
Sinn Féin	Lucina Kelly	5.26%	523	537	559	607	
The Irish People	Alan Sweeney	2.98%	296	303	322		
Electorate: 19,135 Valid: 9,942 Spoilt: 101 Quota: 1,658 Turnout: 10,043 (52.48%)

=== Loughrea ===
Loughrea: 5 seats
Party	Candidate	FPv%	Count					
Party	Candidate	FPv%	1	2	3	4	5	6
Fianna Fáil	Shane Curley	18.65%	1,933					
Fine Gael	Jimmy McClearn	16.92%	1,754					
Independent Ireland	Declan Kelly	16.84%	1,746					
Fine Gael	Michael 'Moegie' Maher	16.41%	1,701	1,801				
Fianna Fáil	Ivan Canning	12.98%	1,346	1,392	1,424	1,439	1,519	2,040
Sinn Féin	Ailish O'Reilly	7.79%	807	824	829	832	930	1,014
Fianna Fáil	Mark Larkin	6.28%	651	684	701	707	761	
Green	Michelle Tooher Madden	2.23%	231	238	242	203		
The Irish People	John McGettigan	1.90%	197	199	202	203		
Electorate: 19,964 Valid: 10,366 Spoilt: 95 Quota: 1,728 Turnout: 10,461 (52.40%)

=== Tuam ===
Tuam: 7 seats
Party	Candidate	FPv%	Count											
Party	Candidate	FPv%	1	2	3	4	5	6	7	8	9	10	11	12
Fine Gael	Andrew Reddington	18.13%	2,784											
Fine Gael	Peter Roche	16.63%	2,553											
Independent Ireland	Shaun Cunniffe	9.36%	1,438	1,456	1,496	1.512	1,544	1,632	1,648	1,656	1,680	1,701	1,802	2,009
Fianna Fáil	Donagh Killilea	8.98%	1,379	1,431	1.522	1,530	1,531	1,533	1,542	1,550	1,564	1,660	1,715	1,804
Fianna Fáil	Mary Hoade	8.64%	1,326	1,798	1,834	1,837	1,839	1,843	1,852	1,859	1,900	1,933		
Fine Gael	Ollie Turner	7.88%	1,210	1,348	1,508	1,513	1,515	1,518	1,527	1,541	1,581	1,656	1,695	1,836
Fianna Fáil	Joe Sheridan	7.51%	1,153	1,171	1,206	1,209	1,209	1,210	1,220	1,228	1,246	1,292	1,327	1,375
Independent	Karey McHugh-Farag	6.79%	1,042	1,089	1,163	1,189	1,199	1,221	1,241	1,276	1,369	1,456	1,628	1,790
Aontú	Luke Silke	3.60%	553	584	639	649	667	699	704	712	722	831	893	
Sinn Féin	Stiofán de Lundres Ó Dálaigh	2.98%	458	474	483	489	493	497	512	644	701	714		
Fianna Fáil	Tom Quirke	2.78%	427	435	531	533	536	536	538	540	549			
Green	Islammiyah Saudique-Kadejo	1.67%	257	280	290	291	293	294	383	402				
Sinn Féin	Deborah Reynolds	1.35%	208	230	244	246	246	248	258					
Labour	Blessing Oguekwe	1.34%	206	219	224	230	230	230						
National Party	Ross Culligan	0.97%	149	150	153	157	197							
The Irish People	Danann Gaughan	0.77%	118	120	124	124								
Independent	Colin Lynch	0.62%	95	98	99									
Electorate: 27,234 Valid: 15,356 Spoilt: 153 Quota: 1,920 Turnout: 15,509 (56.95%)

== Changes ==
=== Co-options ===
Party	Outgoing	LEA	Reason	Date	Co-optee
Sinn Féin	Louis O'Hara	Athenry–Oranmore	Elected to 34th Dáil at the 2024 general election	11 December 2024	Martin McNamara
Fianna Fáil	Albert Dolan	Athenry–Oranmore	Elected to 34th Dáil at the 2024 general election	16 December 2024	Seán Broderick
Fine Gael	Peter Roche	Tuam	Elected to 34th Dáil at the 2024 general election	12 December 2024	Siobhan McHugh
Fianna Fáil	Shane Curley	Loughrea	Elected to 27th Seanad at the 2025 Seanad election	24 March 2025	Michael Regan
Fine Gael	P. J. Murphy	Gort–Kinvara	Elected to 27th Seanad at the 2025 Seanad election	January 2025	Laurie Harney

=== Changes in affiliation ===
Name	LEA	Elected as	New affiliation	Date
James Charity	Athenry-Oranmore	Independent	Fine Gael	11 March 2025
Martin McNamara	Athenry-Oranmore	Sinn Féin	Independent	29 April 2026
