= 2004 Galway County Council election =

2004 Irish local government election

- 11 June 2004

All 30 seats on Galway County Council
	First party	Second party	Third party
Party	Fianna Fáil	Fine Gael	Progressive Democrats
Seats won	10	10	3
Seat change	-6	+1	+1
	Fourth party	Fifth party	Sixth party
Party	Sinn Féin	Labour	Independent
Seats won	1	1	5
Seat change	+1	+1	+2
- Map showing the area of Galway County Council
Council control after election
TBD

An election to Galway County Council took place on 11 June 2004 as part of that year's Irish local elections. 30 councillors were elected from five local electoral areas by PR-STV voting for a five-year term of office.

== Results by party ==
Party	Seats	±	First Pref. votes	FPv%	±%
Fianna Fáil	10	-6	26,017	34.54	
Fine Gael	10	+1	21,133	28.06	
Progressive Democrats	3	+1	6,800	9.03	
Sinn Féin	1	+1	3,040	4.04	
Labour	1	+1	2,542	3.37	
Independent	5	+2	14,164	18.81	
Totals	30	-	75,320	100.00	—

== Results by local electoral area ==
=== Ballinasloe ===
Ballinasloe - 5 seats
Party	Candidate	FPv%	Count						
Party	Candidate	FPv%	1	2	3	4	5	6	7
Fine Gael	Michael Mullins*	15.11	1,725	1,772	1,914				
Fianna Fáil	Tomás Mannion*	12.53	1,431	1,520	1,536	1,682	1,868	2,298	
Fianna Fáil	James Joyce*	10.67	1,219	1,244	1,274	1,299	1,496	1,782	1,915
Sinn Féin	Dermot Connolly	9.68	1,105	1,164	1,288	1,327	1,491	1,658	1,693
Independent	Padraic McGann	9.48	1,083	1,169	1,204	1,350	1,405	1,524	1,591
Fine Gael	Joe Tierney	9.07	1,036	1,059	1,099	1,380	1,530	1,651	1,680
Fianna Fáil	Martin Gormally*	8.68	991	1,055	1,075	1,190	1,387		
Fianna Fáil	Pat O'Sullivan*	7.78	889	921	1,061	1,096			
Fine Gael	Michael Kilgannon	7.36	841	873	881				
Independent	Johnny Walsh	5.17	590	613					
Fianna Fáil	Anne Ruane-Devilly	2.38	272						
Independent	Ann Marie Kelly	2.08	238						
Electorate: 18,346 Valid: 11,420 (62.25%) Spoilt: 202 Quota: 1,904 Turnout: 11,622 (63.35%)

=== Conamara ===
Conamara - 7 seats
Party	Candidate	FPv%	Count															
Party	Candidate	FPv%	1	2	3	4	5	6	7	8	9	10	11	12	13	14	15	16
Independent	Seamus Walsh*	9.06	1,511	1,517	1,528	1,533	1,561	1,607	1,702	1,766	1,814	1,985	2,109					
Fianna Fáil	Seán Ó Tuairisg*	8.26	1,377	1,378	1,409	1,412	1,416	1,441	1,518	1,783	1,811	1,837	1,891	2,080	2,080	2,248		
Independent	Seosamh Ó Cuaig	7.97	1,328	1,331	1,404	1,409	1,428	1,518	1,619	1,623	1,693	1,720	1,962	1,974	1,983	2,253		
Fianna Fáil	Connie Ní Fhatharta*	7.50	1,250	1,252	1,294	1,299	1,320	1,360	1,460	1,495	1,515	1,551	1,627	1,785	1,788	1,993	2,038	2,082
Fianna Fáil	Josie Conneely*	7.29	1,216	1,269	1,283	1,323	1,329	1,333	1,338	1,390	1,503	1,517	1,527	1,618	1,618	1,652	1,661	1,673
Progressive Democrats	Thomas Welby	6.66	1,110	1,114	1,121	1,130	1,149	1,156	1,256	1,310	1,337	1,441	1,488	1,809	1,814	1,915	1,932	1,941
Fine Gael	Eileen Mannion-Mullen	6.62	1,104	1,141	1,146	1,267	1,282	1,328	1,338	1,390	1,503	1,517	1,527	1,618	1,618	1,652	1,661	1,673
Republican Sinn Féin	Tomás Ó Curraoin	6.46	1,076	1,077	1,084	1,084	1,100	1,122	1,145	1,150	1,203	1,228	1,284	1,343	1,345			
Fianna Fáil	Pierce O'Malley*	5.56	927	930	943	951	962	964	971	1,047	1,068	1,178	1,191					
Fine Gael	Seán Kyne	5.18	864	866	869	918	945	1,004	1,014	1,024	1,042	1,307	1,386	1,530	1,533	1,673	1,688	1,700
Independent	Seamus Gavin*	4.82	804	808	811	811	847	849	854	859	885							
Fianna Fáil	Michael Walsh	3.94	657	658	665	678	682	683	684									
Labour	Trevor Ó Clochartaigh	3.71	619	621	638	644	749	798	854	858	931	962						
Sinn Féin	Pam Conroy	3.66	610	629	632	695	722	727	738	752								
Progressive Democrats	Jimi Ó Lorcáin	3.46	577	578	587	590	608	652										
Fine Gael	Caroline Uí Rainne	2.72	454	454	456	463	472											
Green	Diarmuid Mulcahy	2.32	387	389	392	399												
Fine Gael	Ronan Conboy	2.18	364	369	370													
Fianna Fáil	Tomás Ó Briain	1.61	271	274														
Independent	Joseph Joyce	0.98	163															
Electorate: 28,882 Valid: 16,669 (57.71%) Spoilt: 336 Quota: 2,084 Turnout: 17,005 (58.88%)

=== Loughrea ===
Loughrea - 7 seats
Party	Candidate	FPv%	Count								
Party	Candidate	FPv%	1	2	3	4	5	6	7	8	9
Fianna Fáil	Michael Fahy*	11.59	2,004	2,041	2,127	2,170					
Independent	Pat Hynes*	10.95	1,894	2,030	2,114	2,283					
Fine Gael	Bridie Willers	10.03	1,735	1,792	1,935	1,971	2,001	2,022	2,102	2,402	
Independent	Willie Burke	9.78	1,692	1,719	1,782	1,830	2,060	2,067	2,100	2,165	
Fine Gael	Peter Feeney*	8.26	1,428	1,449	1,491	1,498	1,508	1,508	1,807	1,854	1,878
Progressive Democrats	Ciarán Cannon	7.56	1,307	1,353	1,384	1,477	1,523	1,548	1,744	1,837	1,874
Fine Gael	Jimmy McClearn*	7.40	1,280	1,297	1,303	1,326	1,503	1,514	1,533	1,548	1,577
Fianna Fáil	Michael Regan*	6.53	1,129	1,154	1,165	1,304	1,535	1,582	1,764	2,207	
Fianna Fáil	Michael Cunningham*	6.22	1,076	1,095	1,180	1,195	1,235	1,237	1,440		
Fianna Fáil	Moira Coen	5.66	978	999	1,034	1,111	1,166	1,174			
Fianna Fáil	Adrian Cummins	4.70	813	821	830	909					
Fianna Fáil	Gabriel Burke	4.28	741	772	779						
Independent	Adrian Feeney	3.74	647	695							
Sinn Féin	Eoghan Mac Cormaic	3.30	570								
Electorate: 28,098 Valid: 17,294 (61.55%) Spoilt: 278 Quota: 2,162 Turnout: 17,572 (62.54%)

=== Oranmore ===
Oranmore - 4 seats
Party	Candidate	FPv%	Count			
Party	Candidate	FPv%	1	2	3	4
Fianna Fáil	Mary Hoade*	21.71	2,567			
Fine Gael	Jarlath McDonagh*	16.97	2,006	2,027	2,202	2,496
Progressive Democrats	Jim Cuddy*	16.42	1,941	1,959	2,081	2,203
Fine Gael	Fidelma Healy Eames	13.80	1,632	1,644	1,782	2,288
Fianna Fáil	Tim Rabbitt*	13.58	1,606	1,678	1,810	1,950
Fine Gael	Michael Carey	10.65	1,259	1,327	1,388	
Independent	David Collins	3.46	409	414		
Sinn Féin	Cillian Morris	3.41	403	409		
Electorate: 19,286 Valid: 11,823 (61.30%) Spoilt: 159 Quota: 2,365 Turnout: 11,982 (62.13%)

=== Tuam ===
Tuam - 7 seats
Party	Candidate	FPv%	Count								
Party	Candidate	FPv%	1	2	3	4	5	6	7	8	9
Fine Gael	Sinead Connaughton*	11.21	2,030	2,103	2,404						
Labour	Colm Keaveney	10.60	1,923	2,042	2,057	2,061	2,115	2,171	2,382		
Fine Gael	Tiernan Walsh*	10.04	1,818	1,835	1,880	1,893	1,977	1,990	2,065	2,068	2,440
Fine Gael	Tom McHugh*	8.60	1,557	1,583	1,600	1,615	1,668	1,742	1,963	2,000	2,073
Fianna Fáil	Michael Connolly*	8.44	1,528	1,569	1,657	1,681	2,089	2,198	2,264	2,271	
Independent	Seán Canney*	8.19	1,483	1,542	1,565	1,568	1,644	1,886	2,008	2,031	2,113
Independent	Peter Roche	7.09	1,284	1,377	1,399	1,403	1,485	1,524	1,607	1,622	1,677
Fianna Fáil	Tom Reilly	6.09	1,104	1,135	1,141	1,142	1,159	1,325	1,489	1,519	1,862
Fianna Fáil	Patrick O'Brien	5.60	1,014	1,029	1,039	1,042	1,057				
Progressive Democrats	Seamus Quinn*	5.38	974	999	1,096	1,107	1,133	1,207			
Fianna Fáil	Kathleen Quinn*	5.28	957	967	1,100	1,143	1,220	1,376	1,437	1,439	
Progressive Democrats	Pat Gilmore	4.92	891	901							
Independent	Pat Donnellan	4.74	858	914	973	991					
Sinn Féin	Caitlin Glavey	1.94	352								
Independent	Seán Hehir	0.99	180								
Green	Siobhan Nevin	0.89	161								
Electorate: 28,853 Valid: 18,114 (62.78%) Spoilt: 283 Quota: 2,265 Turnout: 18,397 (63.76%)
