= 2009 Galway County Council election =

Part of the 2009 Irish local elections

- 5 June 2009

All 30 seats on Galway County Council
| | First party | Second party | Third party |
|---|---|---|---|
| Party | Fine Gael | Fianna Fáil | Labour |
| Seats won | 13 | 7 | 1 |
| Seat change | +3 | -3 | - |
| | Fourth party | Fifth party | Sixth party |
| Party | Sinn Féin | Republican Sinn Féin | Independent |
| Seats won | 1 | 1 | 7 |
| Seat change | - | +1 | +2 |
| | Seventh party |
| Party | Progressive Democrats |
| Seats won | 0 |
| Seat change | -3 |
- Map showing the area of Galway County Council
Council control after election
TBD

An election to Galway County Council took place on 5 June 2009 as part of that year's Irish local elections. 30 councillors were elected from five local electoral areas (LEAs) for a five-year term of office on the electoral system of proportional representation by means of the single transferable vote (PR-STV).

== Results by party ==
| Party | Seats | ± | First Pref. votes | FPv% | ±% |
|---|---|---|---|---|---|
| Fine Gael | 13 | +3 | 29,452 | 38.54 | |
| Fianna Fáil | 7 | -3 | 18,800 | 24.60 | |
| Labour | 1 | - | 4,692 | 6.14 | |
| Sinn Féin | 1 | - | 3,799 | 4.97 | |
| Republican Sinn Féin | 1 | +1 | 1,387 | 1.82 | |
| Independent | 7 | +2 | 17,841 | 23.35 | |
| Progressive Democrats | 0 | -3 | - | - | |
| Totals | 30 | - | 76,413 | 100.00 | — |

== Results by local electoral area ==
=== Ballinasloe ===
Ballinasloe - 5 seats
| Party | Candidate | FPv% | Count | | | | |
| Party | Candidate | FPv% | 1 | 2 | 3 | 4 | 5 |
|---|---|---|---|---|---|---|---|
| Fine Gael | Paul Connaughton Jnr | 18.80 | 2,563 | | | | |
| Fianna Fáil | Tomás Mannion* | 14.78 | 2,015 | 2,074 | 2,091 | 2,159 | 2,196 |
| Independent | Tim Broderick | 14.52 | 1,979 | 2,013 | 2,115 | 2,262 | 2,437 |
| Fine Gael | Michael Mullins* | 13.93 | 1,899 | 1,978 | 2,239 | 2,904 | |
| Sinn Féin | Dermot Connolly* | 12.75 | 1,738 | 1,757 | 1,850 | 2,047 | 2,160 |
| Fianna Fáil | James Joyce* | 10.88 | 1,483 | 1,489 | 1,699 | 1,788 | 1,847 |
| Fine Gael | Michael Finnerty | 8.10 | 1,104 | 1,169 | 1,308 | | |
| Fine Gael | John Goode | 5.81 | 792 | 817 | | | |
| Christian Solidarity | Clare Flynn | 0.44 | 60 | 63 | | | |
Electorate: 22,702 Valid: 13,633 (60.05%) Spoilt: 195 Quota: 2,273 Turnout: 13,828 (60.91%)

=== Connemara ===
Connemara - 7 seats
| Party | Candidate | FPv% | Count | | | | | | | |
| Party | Candidate | FPv% | 1 | 2 | 3 | 4 | 5 | 6 | 7 | 8 |
|---|---|---|---|---|---|---|---|---|---|---|
| Independent | Thomas Welby* | 15.69 | 2,584 | | | | | | | |
| Fine Gael | Seán Kyne* | 11.70 | 1,927 | 2,061 | | | | | | |
| Fine Gael | Eileen Mannion-Mullen | 9.12 | 1,501 | 1,565 | 1,588 | 1,749 | 1,771 | 1,843 | 2,263 | |
| Fianna Fáil | Seán Ó Tuairisg* | 8.91 | 1,467 | 1,491 | 1,571 | 1,581 | 1,884 | 1,982 | 2,115 | |
| Republican Sinn Féin | Tomás Ó Curraoin | 8.42 | 1,387 | 1,416 | 1,501 | 1,522 | 1,576 | 1,754 | 1,976 | 2,050 |
| Fianna Fáil | Josie Conneely* | 7.22 | 1,189 | 1,217 | 1,247 | 1,373 | 1,435 | 1,488 | 1,506 | 1,513 |
| Fine Gael | Seosamh Ó Laoi | 7.16 | 1,178 | 1,189 | 1,212 | 1,220 | 1,297 | 1,390 | | |
| Independent | Seosamh Ó Cuaig* | 6.92 | 1,140 | 1,160 | 1,195 | 1,221 | 1,320 | 1,702 | 1,974 | 2,067 |
| Fianna Fáil | Seamus Walsh* | 6.58 | 1,083 | 1,194 | 1,381 | 1,410 | 1,554 | 1,617 | 1,717 | 1,738 |
| Sinn Féin | Trevor Ó Clochartaigh | 5.42 | 893 | 906 | 915 | 1,193 | 1,267 | | | |
| Fianna Fáil | Connie Ní Fhatharta* | 4.90 | 806 | 817 | 896 | 906 | | | | |
| Sinn Féin | Kenneth Coyne | 4.29 | 706 | 748 | 764 | | | | | |
| Fianna Fáil | Louise O'Connor | 3.22 | 530 | 556 | | | | | | |
| Independent | Chris Walsh | 0.44 | 73 | 85 | | | | | | |
Electorate: 30,414 Valid: 16,464 (54.13%) Spoilt: 296 Quota: 2,059 Turnout: 16,760 (55.11%)

=== Loughrea ===
Loughrea - 7 seats
| Party | Candidate | FPv% | Count | | | | | | | |
| Party | Candidate | FPv% | 1 | 2 | 3 | 4 | 5 | 6 | 7 | 8 |
|---|---|---|---|---|---|---|---|---|---|---|
| Independent | Michael Fahy* | 12.28 | 2,247 | 2,262 | 2,287 | | | | | |
| Independent | Pat Hynes* | 10.86 | 1,987 | 2,004 | 2,051 | 2,091 | 2,237 | 2,425 | | |
| Fine Gael | Jimmy McClearn | 10.25 | 1,875 | 1,880 | 1,899 | 1,909 | 1,938 | 1,985 | 1,991 | 2,144 |
| Fine Gael | Bridie Willers* | 9.79 | 1,791 | 1,826 | 1,930 | 2,063 | 2,104 | 2,250 | 2,272 | 2,354 |
| Fine Gael | Peter Feeney* | 9.75 | 1,784 | 1,856 | 1,900 | 1,940 | 1,967 | 2,159 | 2,170 | 2,218 |
| Fine Gael | Michael 'Moegie' Maher* | 8.94 | 1,635 | 1,655 | 1,697 | 1,712 | 1,795 | 1,909 | 1,924 | 2,039 |
| Fianna Fáil | Gerry Finnerty | 8.09 | 1,480 | 1,483 | 1,488 | 1,598 | 1,780 | 1,824 | 1,829 | 2,399 |
| Independent | Willie Burke* | 6.92 | 1,265 | 1,276 | 1,304 | 1,335 | 1,368 | 1,455 | 1,507 | 1,630 |
| Fianna Fáil | Michael Regan* | 6.10 | 1,116 | 1,123 | 1,133 | 1,137 | 1,328 | 1,388 | 1,392 | |
| Fianna Fáil | Gabriel Burke | 4.44 | 813 | 821 | 828 | 830 | | | | |
| Independent | Lorraine Higgins | 4.42 | 809 | 890 | 987 | 1,143 | 1,187 | | | |
| Independent | Adrian Feeney | 2.97 | 543 | 587 | 649 | | | | | |
| Labour | P.J. McDonnell | 2.61 | 477 | 584 | | | | | | |
| Green | Patrick Creed | 2.09 | 382 | | | | | | | |
| Independent | Enda Glynn | 0.48 | 88 | | | | | | | |
Electorate: 30,971 Valid: 18,292 (59.06%) Spoilt: 216 Quota: 2,287 Turnout: 18,508 (59.76%)

=== Oranmore ===
Oranmore - 4 seats
| Party | Candidate | FPv% | Count | | | | | | | | |
| Party | Candidate | FPv% | 1 | 2 | 3 | 4 | 5 | 6 | 7 | 8 | 9 |
|---|---|---|---|---|---|---|---|---|---|---|---|
| Independent | Jim Cuddy* | 17.45 | 1,614 | 1,654 | 1,751 | 1,859 | | | | | |
| Fine Gael | Jarlath McDonagh* | 14.43 | 1,335 | 1,341 | 1,543 | 1,575 | 1,757 | 1,950 | | | |
| Fianna Fáil | Malachy Noone | 12.92 | 1,195 | 1,203 | 1,273 | 1,625 | 1,839 | 1,919 | | | |
| Fine Gael | Liam Carroll | 9.56 | 884 | 897 | 988 | 1,062 | 1,134 | 1,524 | 1,589 | 1,608 | 1,612 |
| Labour | Enda O'Rourke | 9.27 | 858 | 901 | 944 | 1,029 | 1,321 | 1,549 | 1,583 | 1,605 | 1,609 |
| Labour | Josette Farrell | 9.06 | 838 | 869 | 935 | 972 | | | | | |
| Fine Gael | Michael Eames | 9.00 | 833 | 848 | 934 | 993 | 1,058 | | | | |
| Fianna Fáil | Dolores Kilroe | 8.43 | 780 | 786 | 802 | | | | | | |
| Fine Gael | Eamon Fox | 7.47 | 691 | 697 | | | | | | | |
| Sinn Féin | Anna Marley | 1.93 | 179 | | | | | | | | |
| Independent | Eamon Coyle | 0.48 | 44 | | | | | | | | |
Electorate: 17,575 Valid: 9,251 (52.64%) Spoilt: 97 Quota: 1,851 Turnout: 9,348 (53.19%)

=== Tuam ===
Tuam - 7 seats
| Party | Candidate | FPv% | Count | | | | | | | | |
| Party | Candidate | FPv% | 1 | 2 | 3 | 4 | 5 | 6 | 7 | 8 | 9 |
|---|---|---|---|---|---|---|---|---|---|---|---|
| Independent | Seán Canney* | 17.43 | 3,273 | | | | | | | | |
| Fine Gael | Tom McHugh* | 15.15 | 2,845 | | | | | | | | |
| Labour | Colm Keaveney* | 13.42 | 2,519 | | | | | | | | |
| Fine Gael | Tiernan Walsh* | 10.55 | 1,980 | 2,023 | 2,153 | 2,166 | 2,203 | 2,343 | 2,594 | | |
| Fianna Fáil | Mary Hoade* | 9.93 | 1,864 | 2,033 | 2,053 | 2,064 | 2,097 | 2,605 | | | |
| Fine Gael | Peter Roche | 9.17 | 1,722 | 1,921 | 2,057 | 2,092 | 2,212 | 2,606 | | | |
| Fianna Fáil | Michael Connolly* | 8.89 | 1,668 | 1,777 | 1,824 | 1,836 | 1,889 | 1,917 | 1,919 | 1,985 | 2,013 |
| Fianna Fáil | Tom Reilly* | 6.98 | 1,311 | 1,511 | 1,601 | 1,652 | 1,702 | 1,727 | 1,733 | 1,812 | 1,836 |
| Fine Gael | Michael Carey* | 5.93 | 1,113 | 1,223 | 1,275 | 1,290 | 1,334 | | | | |
| Sinn Féin | Grainne Morahan | 1.51 | 283 | 321 | 335 | 356 | | | | | |
| Independent | Seán Hehir | 1.04 | 195 | 253 | 262 | 276 | | | | | |
Electorate: 31,011 Valid: 18,773 (60.54%) Spoilt: 209 Quota: 2,347 Turnout: 18,982 (61.21%)
