= 1991 Galway County Council election =

Part of the 1991 Irish local elections

- 27 June 1991

All 30 seats on Galway County Council
	First party	Second party	Third party
Party	Fianna Fáil	Fine Gael	Progressive Democrats
Seats won	14	10	4
Seat change	-3	+1	+4
	Fourth party	Fifth party
Party	Independent	Sinn Féin
Seats won	2	0
Seat change	-1	-1
- Map showing the area of Galway County Council
Council control after election
TBD

An election to Galway County Council took place on 27 June 1991 as part of that year's Irish local elections. 30 councillors were elected from five local electoral areas (LEAs) for a five-year term of office on the electoral system of proportional representation by means of the single transferable vote (PR-STV). This term was extended twice, first to 1998, then to 1999.

== Results by party ==
Party	Seats	±	First Pref. votes	FPv%	±%
Fianna Fáil	14	-3	25,630	44.89	
Fine Gael	10	+1	15,976	27.98	
Progressive Democrats	4	+4	6,177	10.82	
Independent	2	-1	7,630	13.36	
Sinn Féin	0	-1			
Totals	30	0	57,093	100.00	—

== Results by local electoral area ==
=== Ballinasloe ===
Ballinasloe - 5 seats
Party	Candidate	FPv%	Count					
Party	Candidate	FPv%	1	2	3	4	5	6
Fianna Fáil	Michael P. Kitt TD*	23.8%	2,230					
Fianna Fáil	Joe Callanan*	18.7%	1,751					
Fine Gael	Michael Mullins*	17.9%	1,676	1,669				
Fine Gael	Michael Finnerty	12%	1,122	926	1,184	1,200	1,597	
Fianna Fáil	James Joyce*	9.7%	904	1,177	1,265	1,380	1,429	1,442
Independent	Joe Brennan*	9.4%	883	945	968			
Fianna Fáil	Pat O'Sullivan	8.5%	799	1,070	1,132	1,393	1,458	1,480
Electorate: 15,564 Valid: 9,365 (60.17%) Spoilt: 95 Quota: 1,562 Turnout: 9,460 (60.78%)

=== Connemara ===
Connemara - 5 seats
Party	Candidate	FPv%	Count									
Party	Candidate	FPv%	1	2	3	4	5	6	7	8	9	10
Fianna Fáil	Senator Éamon Ó Cuív	20%	1,766									
Fine Gael	John Mannion Jnr*	13.5%	1,189	1,211	1,215	1,253	1,333	1,410	1,500			
Fianna Fáil	Connie Ní Fhatharta	10.1%	890	948	952	955	958	1,042	1,057	1,057	1,136	1,284
Independent	Seosamh Ó Cuaig*	8.8%	776	801	804	833	844	852	860	860	982	
Independent	Peadar Ó Tuathail*	8%	708	718	722	752	769	769	782	784	1,011	1,461
Fianna Fáil	Tom Welby Snr*	7.8%	689	781	783	794	815	961	1,040	1,043	1,070	1,117
Fine Gael	Pól Ó Foighil	7.8%	688	703	708	717	729	737	756	765		
Progressive Democrats	Michael O'Neill	7.3%	647	656	658	696	765	836	1,179	1,191	1,258	1,307
Progressive Democrats	Jimmy Geoghegan	6.5%	574	585	587	589	597	601				
Fianna Fáil	Malachy King	4.3%	384	417	419	439	469					
Independent	Malachy Gorman	3%	266	270	271	309						
Independent	Erin Gibbons	2.6%	228	235	240							
Independent	Joe Molloy	0.4%	35	41								
Electorate: 14,706 Valid: 8,840 (60.11%) Spoilt: 135 Quota: 1,474 Turnout: 8,975 (61.03%)

=== Galway ===
Galway - 6 seats
Party	Candidate	FPv%	Count							
Party	Candidate	FPv%	1	2	3	4	5	6	7	8
Fine Gael	Jarlath McDonagh*	18.2%	1,971							
Independent	Seamus Gavin	13.2%	1,431	1,436	1,497	1,551				
Fianna Fáil	Seán Ó Neachtain	11.1%	1,201	1,208	1,227	1,271	1,400	1,498	1,566	
Fianna Fáil	Paddy McHugh*	10.1%	1,095	1,124	1,144	1,146	1,162	1,216	1,219	1,554
Fine Gael	Pádraic McCormack TD*	9.5%	1,027	1,215	1,242	1,342	1,392	1,444	1,492	1,546
Progressive Democrats	Evelyn Varley	7.9%	858	881	912	918	949	973	1,342	1,440
Fianna Fáil	Murty McGrath	7%	753	852	862	868	890	1,072	1,082	1,226
Fianna Fáil	Mary Hoade	5.3%	571	584	595	603	627	682	704	
Fianna Fáil	John Molloy*	4.3%	466	481	490	494	519			
Progressive Democrats	Marie Halliday	4.2%	453	458	488	532	588	601		
Republican Sinn Féin	Tomás Ó Curraoin	3.6%	390	396	427	477				
Labour	Tom Cunningham	2.8%	300	305						
Fine Gael	Patsy Clancy	2.8%	298	329	349					
Electorate: 18,636 Valid: 10,814 (58.03%) Spoilt: 111 Quota: 1,545 Turnout: 10,925 (58.62%)

=== Loughrea ===
Loughrea - 7 seats
Party	Candidate	FPv%	Count													
Party	Candidate	FPv%	1	2	3	4	5	6	7	8	9	10	11	12	13	14
Fianna Fáil	Michael Fahy*	13.7%	2,055													
Fianna Fáil	Matt Loughnane*	9.9%	1,484	1,511	1,518	1,523	1,530	1,551	1,580	1,586	1,623	1,861	2,119			
Fine Gael	Jimmy McClearn	9.1%	1,367	1,367	1,367	1,368	1,372	1,379	1,482	1,485	1,618	1,685	1,690	1,690	1,848	1,931
Fianna Fáil	Michael Regan*	8.3%	1,247	1,256	1,257	1,259	1,262	1,276	1,304	1,309	1,339	1,610	1,733	1,801	1,886	
Progressive Democrats	Willie Burke	7.3%	1,102	1,104	1,110	1,123	1,138	1,142	1,216	1,252	1,297	1,350	1,419	1,426	1,562	1,580
Independent	Pat Hynes	7.3%	1,100	1,102	1,104	1,134	1,140	1,179	1,188	1,216	1,271	1,357	1,373	1,374	1,427	1,432
Fine Gael	Martin Lynch*	6.8%	1,018	1,021	1,027	1,031	1,042	1,056	1,069	1,080	1,210	1,221	1,298	1,314		
Fianna Fáil	Bernie O'Connor	6.6%	986	1,008	1,018	1,026	1,033	1,047	1,049	1,081	1,104	1,133				
Fianna Fáil	Michael Cunningham	5.9%	890	938	944	970	976	1,025	1,028	1,055	1,127	1,194	1,472	1,546	1,705	1,709
Fine Gael	Toddie Byrne	5.8%	867	883	890	903	916	927	930	1,073	1,325	1,352	1,479	1,486	1,987	
Fianna Fáil	Michael Flanagan	5.5%	828	843	844	845	847	850	900	908	960					
Fine Gael	Justin Flannery	5.3%	792	807	813	823	832	855	863	889						
Independent	Donal O'Meara	2.3%	342	343	344	346	353	354								
Workers' Party	Stan McEoin	2.3%	338	344	350	360	403	431	433							
Sinn Féin	Michael Loughrey	1.5%	232	237	238	252	260									
Independent	P.J. Baldwin	1%	146	150	150											
Independent	Malcolm Samuel	0.9%	142	143	152	153										
Independent	Margaret Murphy	0.5%	72	74												
Electorate: 22,731 Valid: 15,008 (66.02%) Spoilt: 134 Quota: 1,877 Turnout: 15,142 (66.61%)

=== Tuam ===
Tuam - 7 seats
Party	Candidate	FPv%	Count									
Party	Candidate	FPv%	1	2	3	4	5	6	7	8	9	10
Progressive Democrats	Joe Burke*	14%	1,824									
Fine Gael	Paul Connaughton TD	12.6%	1,650									
Fianna Fáil	Senator Thomas Hussey*	11%	1,440	1,455	1,456	1,610	1,666					
Fianna Fáil	Patrick Finnegan*	9.8%	1,274	1,310	1,311	1,342	1,413	1,462	1,474	1,609	1,805	
Fine Gael	Tiernan Walsh*	9.1%	1,191	1,194	1,196	1,232	1,246	1,366	1,367	1,420	1,430	1,434
Fine Gael	Michael Ryan*	8.6%	1,120	1,131	1,137	1,167	1,304	1,362	1,365	1,471	1,680	
Republican Sinn Féin	Frank Glynn*	6.2%	810	829	830	842	873	945	946	1,147	1,194	1,217
Progressive Democrats	T.J. Gormley	5.5%	719	805	806	810	855	899	900			
Fianna Fáil	Michael Connolly	5.4%	703	710	711	789	860	909	919	963		
Fianna Fáil	Kathleen Quinn	5.2%	677	679	680	798	820	958	967	1,008	1,204	1,348
Independent	Sean Hehir	4.3%	565	572	572	575						
Fianna Fáil	Peter Raftery*	4.2%	547	548	549							
Independent	Tom Ward	4.2%	546	549	550	596	654					
Electorate: 19,649 Valid: 13,066 (66.50%) Spoilt: 133 Quota: 1,634 Turnout: 13,199 (67.17%)
