= 1999 Galway County Council election =

Part of the 1999 Irish local elections

- 10 June 1999

All 30 seats to Galway County Council
	First party	Second party	Third party
Party	Fianna Fáil	Fine Gael	Progressive Democrats
Seats won	16	9	2
Seat change	+2	-1	-2
	Fourth party
Party	Independent
Seats won	3
Seat change	+1
- Map showing the area of Galway County Council
Council control after election
TBD

An election to Galway County Council took place on 10 June 1999 as part of that year's Irish local elections. 30 councillors were elected from five local electoral areas on the system of proportional representation by means of the single transferable vote (PR-STV) for a five-year term of office.

== Results by party ==
Party	Seats	±	First Pref. votes	FPv%	±%
Fianna Fáil	16	+2	26,703	45.06	
Fine Gael	9	-1	17,688	29.85	
Progressive Democrats	2	-2	3,567	6.02	
Independent	3	+1	9,499	16.03	
Totals	30	-	59,262	100.00	—

== Results by local electoral area ==
=== Ballinasloe ===
Ballinasloe - 5 seats
Party	Candidate	FPv%	Count			
Party	Candidate	FPv%	1	2	3	4
Fianna Fáil	Joe Callanan*	30.34	3,006			
Fine Gael	Michael Mullins*	14.88	1,474	1,669		
Fianna Fáil	James Joyce	13.04	1,292	1,540	1,607	1,714
Fianna Fáil	Tomás Mannion	12.02	1,191	1,528	1,574	1,659
Fianna Fáil	Pat O'Sullivan*	9.55	946	1,277	1,376	1,737
Fine Gael	Michael Finnerty*	8.50	842	926	1,002	1,176
Independent	John Molloy	7.80	773	850	938	
Sinn Féin	Dermot Connolly	3.88	384	466		
Electorate: 16,521 Valid: 9,908 (59.97%) Spoilt: 190 Quota: 1,652 Turnout: 10,098 (61.12%)

=== Connemara ===
Connemara - 7 seats
Party	Candidate	FPv%	Count									
Party	Candidate	FPv%	1	2	3	4	5	6	7	8	9	10
Fine Gael	John Mannion Jnr*	12.47	1,570	1,611								
Fine Gael	Pól Ó Foighil	11.42	1,438	1,453	1,464	1,490	1,638					
Independent	Seamus Gavin*	11.20	1,410	1,434	1,437	1,456	1,463	1,474	1,561	1,583		
Fianna Fáil	Josie Conneely*	9.50	1,196	1,196	1,197	1,344	1,391	1,400	1,433	1,539	1,667	
Fianna Fáil	Seán Ó Neachtain*	8.65	1,089	1,090	1,090	1,096	1,109	1,112	1,258	1,384	1,583	
Fianna Fáil	Connie Ní Fhatharta*	8.38	1,055	1,055	1,055	1,063	1,097	1,103	1,157	1,365	1,500	1,546
Independent	Seamus Walsh	7.37	928	971	975	991	1,011	1,019	1,085	1,099	1,313	1,326
Independent	Tom Welby Snr	7.13	897	928	931	985	1,005	1,017	1,059	1,081	1,269	1,281
Fianna Fáil	Pierce O'Malley	6.66	838	856	858	878	889	891	911	980		
Republican Sinn Féin	Tomás Ó Curraoin	4.64	584	587	587	590	608	614				
Fianna Fáil	Eithne Nic Dhonnchadha	4.30	541	542	542	549	613	619	654			
Independent	Eamonn McLoughlin	3.40	428	429	430							
Fine Gael	Eamonn Mylotte	3.09	389	420	432	485						
Fine Gael	Paul Stewart	1.78	224									
Electorate: 25,628 Valid: 12,587 (49.11%) Spoilt: 275 Quota: 1,574 Turnout: 12,862 (50.19%)

=== Loughrea ===
Loughrea - 7 seats
Party	Candidate	FPv%	Count						
Party	Candidate	FPv%	1	2	3	4	5	6	7
Fianna Fáil	Michael Fahy*	14.41	2,068						
Fine Gael	Ulick Burke TD	12.98	1,863						
Independent	Pat Hynes	9.96	1,429	1,442	1,467	1,490	1,534	1,662	1,712
Fine Gael	Jimmy McClearn*	9.73	1,396	1,398	1,403	1,466	1,611	2,143	
Fianna Fáil	Michael Cunningham*	9.60	1,377	1,500	1,574	1,620	1,699	1,756	1,769
Fianna Fáil	Michael Regan*	9.41	1,351	1,381	1,394	1,543	1,584	1,763	1,913
Fianna Fáil	Matt Loughnane*	8.90	1,277	1,329	1,344	1,433	1,564	1,643	1,683
Progressive Democrats	Willie Burke*	7.28	1,045	1,051	1,062	1,210	1,240		
Fine Gael	Peter Feeney	7.06	1,013	1,020	1,025	1,030	1,320	1,360	1,398
Fine Gael	Joe Monaghan	5.60	804	820	830	835			
Fianna Fáil	Walter Burke	3.82	548	560	565				
Independent	P.J. Baldwin	0.99	142	153					
Fine Gael	Donal Healy	0.26	37	39					
Electorate: 23,845 Valid: 14,350 (60.18%) Spoilt: 277 Quota: 1,794 Turnout: 14,627 (61.34%)

=== Oranmore ===
Oranmore - 4 seats
Party	Candidate	FPv%	Count				
Party	Candidate	FPv%	1	2	3	4	5
Fine Gael	Senator Jarlath McDonagh*	23.09	1,924				
Progressive Democrats	Noel Grealish	16.70	1,357	1,444	1,517	1,779	
Fianna Fáil	Mary Hoade	16.26	1,314	1,340	1,415	1,495	1,600
Fianna Fáil	Tim Rabbitt	19.78	1,247	1,284	1,433	1,848	
Fine Gael	Kathleen Carey	13.30	1,108	1,176	1,195	1,385	1,461
Independent	Enda O'Rourke	12.24	1,020	1,046	1,081		
Fianna Fáil	John Molloy	4.34	362	375			
Electorate: 15,503 Valid: 8,332 (53.74%) Spoilt: 74 Quota: 1,667 Turnout: 8,406 (54.22%)

=== Tuam ===
Tuam - 7 seats
Party	Candidate	FPv%	Count									
Party	Candidate	FPv%	1	2	3	4	5	6	7	8	9	10
Fine Gael	Paul Connaughton TD*	11.55	1,745	1,774	1,885	2,155						
Fianna Fáil	Kathleen Quinn*	9.49	1,433	1,438	1,486	1,546	1,560	1,595	1,641	2,048		
Fianna Fáil	Paddy McHugh*	8.99	1,358	1,396	1,448	1,461	1,469	1,585	1,709	1,913		
Fine Gael	Tom McHugh	8.32	1,256	1,285	1,375	1,449	1,504	1,699	1,840	1,919		
Fine Gael	Tiernan Walsh*	7.98	1,205	1,208	1,222	1,308	1,379	1,421	1,476	1,596	1,634	1,642
Progressive Democrats	Joe Burke*	7.71	1,165	1,201	1,293	1,321	1,335	1,496	1,589	1,656	1,662	1,669
Fianna Fáil	Michael Connolly	7.30	1,103	1,120	1,155	1,231	1,255	1,277	1,504	1,673	1,739	1,744
Fianna Fáil	Tom Hussey*	7.12	1,075	1,088	1,161	1,218	1,234	1,306	1,390			
Fianna Fáil	Tom Reilly	6.86	1,036	1,082	1,130	1,141	1,142	1,297	1,437	1,551	1,600	1,610
Independent	Peter Roche	6.57	992	1,052	1,082	1,150	1,167	1,233				
Labour	Colm Keaveney	5.54	837	891	977	1,013	1,028					
Fine Gael	Tom Meehan	5.27	796	808	816							
Independent	John Brogan	4.79	724	738								
Independent	Bartley Furey	1.54	233									
Independent	Seán Hehir	0.97	147									
Electorate: 25,351 Valid: 15,105 (66.79%) Spoilt: 272 Quota: 1,889 Turnout: 15,377 (67.36%)
