= 1985 Galway County Council election =

Part of the 1985 Irish local elections

- 20 June 1985

All 30 seats on Galway County Council
	First party	Second party	Third party
Party	Fianna Fáil	Fine Gael	Sinn Féin
Seats won	17	9	1
Seat change	+2	-2	-1
	Fourth party
Party	Independent
Seats won	3
Seat change	+1
- Map showing the area of Galway County Council
Council control after election
Fianna Fail

An election to Galway County Council took place on 20 June 1985 as part of that year's Irish local elections. 30 councillors were elected from five local electoral areas (LEAs) for a five-year term of office on the electoral system of proportional representation by means of the single transferable vote (PR-STV). This term was extended for a further year, to 1991.

== Results by party ==
Party	Seats	±	First Pref. votes	FPv%	±%
Fianna Fáil	17	+2	32,716	54.47	
Fine Gael	9	-2	16,828	28.02	
Sinn Féin	1	-1	2,682	4.47	
Independent	3	+1	7,190	11.97	
Labour	0	-1	124	0.21	
Totals	30	-1	60,059	100.00	—

== Results by local electoral area ==
=== Ballinasloe ===
Ballinasloe: 5 seats
Party	Candidate	FPv%	Count							
Party	Candidate	FPv%	1	2	3	4	5	6	7	8
Fianna Fáil	Michael P. Kitt TD		2,368							
Fianna Fáil	Joe Callanan*		1,812	2,087						
Fine Gael	Michael Mullins		1,634	1,667	1,689	1,809	1,836	2,159		
Independent	Joe Brennan*		1,359	1,382	1,389	1,449	1,475	1,588	1,619	1,836
Fianna Fáil	James Joyce*		1,181	1,227	1,292	1,304	1,516	1,577	1,587	2,044
Fine Gael	Michael Conneely		714	730	737	768	864	958	1,168	1,196
Fianna Fáil	Pat O'Sullivan		587	636	696	738	870	899	910	
Fine Gael	Liam Naughton		575	581	583	676	682			
Fianna Fáil	Peter Conroy		430	499	586	593				
Fine Gael	Sean Og Hurley		395	403	405					
Electorate: 15,563 Valid: 11,055 (72.15%) Spoilt: 173 Quota: 1,843 Turnout: 11,228

=== Connemara ===
Connemara: 5 seats
Party	Candidate	FPv%	Count							
Party	Candidate	FPv%	1	2	3	4	5	6	7	8
Fianna Fáil	Nicholas O'Connor*		1,842							
Fine Gael	John Mannion Jnr*		1,297	1,300	1,312	1,468	1,488	1,959		
Fianna Fáil	Michael O Moráin*		1,042	1,201	1,205	1,270	1,334	1,350	1,367	1,567
Fianna Fáil	Tom Welby Snr*		1,005	1,016	1,026	1,030	1,034	1,158	1,216	1,534
Fianna Fáil	Gerald Bartley*		967	987	990	992	1,002	1,014	1,033	1,208
Independent	Peadar Ó Tuathail		803	864	900	936	1,204	1,220	1,256	1,303
Fianna Fáil	Éamon Ó Cuív		799	826	849	855	862	885	915	
Fine Gael	Paddy Clancy		596	597	609	686	695			
Fine Gael	Eamonn Moylette		373	376	380					
Independent	Noel Mac Donnchadha		368	385	405	428				
Independent	Seosadh Ó Maolaidh		114	116						
Independent	Christopher Walsh		18	18						
Electorate: 15,670 Valid: 9,224 (59.85%) Spoilt: 154 Quota: 1,538 Turnout: 9,378

=== Galway ===
Galway: 6 seats
Party	Candidate	FPv%	Count					
Party	Candidate	FPv%	1	2	3	4	5	6
Fianna Fáil	Sen. Mark Killilea Jnr*		1,917					
Fianna Fáil	Bobby Molloy TD*		1,776					
Fine Gael	Padraig McCormack*		1,027	1,404				
Sinn Féin	Paddy Ruane*		1,157	1,208	1,231	1,282	1,301	1,303
Fianna Fáil	Paddy McHugh		1,153	1,419				
Fine Gael	Jarlath McDonagh		966	1,002	1,016	1,053	1,392	1,392
Fianna Fáil	John Molloy		791	905	1,197	1,238	1,301	1,317
Fine Gael	Liam MacCana		405	413	435	532		
Workers' Party	Colm Ó Donnchadha		271	275	299			
Electorate: 17,220 Valid: 9,803 (57.55%) Spoilt: 107 Quota: 1,401 Turnout: 9,910

=== Loughrea ===
Loughrea: 7 seats
Party	Candidate	FPv%	Count											
Party	Candidate	FPv%	1	2	3	4	5	6	7	8	9	10	11	12
Fianna Fáil	Frank Fahey TD*		2,389											
Fianna Fáil	Michael Fahy*		2,147											
Fine Gael	Sen. Ulick Burke		2,132											
Fianna Fáil	Noel Treacy TD		1,635	1,708	1,727	1,729	1,736	1,750	1,785	1,829	2,033			
Fianna Fáil	Tony Murphy*		1,112	1,161	1,182	1,187	1,189	1,198	1,247	1,250	1,278	1,363	1,368	
Fianna Fáil	Eddie Haverty*		992	1,069	1,087	1,089	1,097	1,112	1,139	1,294	1,372	1,411	1,420	1,705
Fianna Fáil	Matt Loughnane		950	1,027	1,058	1,061	1,067	1,091	1,113	1,156	1,320	1,372	1,387	1,803
Fine Gael	Martin Lynch*		854	859	863	876	886	896	916	1,014	1,097	1,486	1,488	1,772
Independent	Norman Morgan		771	776	778	786	799	827	865	931				
Fine Gael	Enda O'Rourke		760	769	775	831	834	869	874	974	1,043			
Fine Gael	Joe Lambert		759	821	851	857	896	967	1,070	1,293	1,412	1,703	1,705	1,778
Fine Gael	Jimmy McClearn		747	748	748	751	793	796	801					
Sinn Féin	Michael Loughrey		380	398	405	409	410	436						
Workers' Party	Stan McEoin		246	257	265	285	286							
Labour	Peter O'Driscoll		124	126	127									
Electorate: 22,507 Valid: 15,998 (71.81%) Spoilt: 165 Quota: 2,000 Turnout: 16,163

=== Tuam ===
Tuam: 7 seats
Party	Candidate	FPv%	Count									
Party	Candidate	FPv%	1	2	3	4	5	6	7	8	9	10
Independent	Joe Burke*		2,438									
Fianna Fáil	Thomas Hussey		1,960									
Fianna Fáil	Patrick Finnegan*		1,533	1,646	1,724	1,742	1,984					
Fine Gael	Michael Ryan*		1,350	1,406	1,414	1,523	1,546	1,549	1,868			
Sinn Féin	Frank Glynn*		1,145	1,292	1,308	1,349	1,479	1,503	1,575	1,587	1,666	1,915
Fine Gael	Tiernan Walsh		974	998	1,009	1,054	1,066	1,068	1,199	1,293	1,468	1,548
Fianna Fáil	Peter Raftery		954	960	988	991	1,039	1,094	1,123	1,125	1,321	1,325
Fianna Fáil	Michael Dunne		818	858	884	897	957	1,043	1,078	1,084	1,232	1,319
Independent	Gerard Rushe		742	757	761	771	782	783	828	833		
Independent	Jarlath Keane		577	730	738	808	822	824	837	838	869	
Fine Gael	Jim Mannion		566	582	589	682	696	697				
Fianna Fáil	Clare Kilgarriff-Fitzgerald		556	584	610	630						
Fine Gael	Niall Joyce		364	456	458							
Electorate: 22,507 Valid: 13,979 (71.3%) Spoilt: 181 Quota: 1,748 Turnout: 14,160
