= Noel Thomas =

Noel Thomas may refer to:

- Noel Thomas (British Army officer) (1915 – 1983), British soldier
- Noel Thomas (politician) (born 1973 or 1974), Irish politician
- Noel Thomas (curler), (born 1980), English curler
- Noel Thomas Jr. (born 1994), American football player
