= Gluaiseacht Chearta Sibhialta na Gaeltachta =

Irish civil rights movement, concerned with rights of people in Gaeltacht areas

Gluaiseacht Chearta Siabhialta na Gaeltachta
- Date: 1969–1970s
- Location: Ireland, especially Connemara
- Result: Údarás na Gaeltachta created to encourage local development; RTÉ Raidió na Gaeltachta founded as national radio station; Oireachtas na Gaeilge held around Ireland, outside of Dublin

Gluaiseacht Chearta Sibhialta na Gaeltachta (English: "The Gaeltacht Civil Rights Movement") or Coiste Cearta Síbialta na Gaeilge (English: Irish Language Civil Rights Committee"), was a pressure group campaigning for social, economic and cultural rights for native-speakers of Irish living in Gaeltacht areas. It was founded in Connemara in 1969 to highlight the decline of the Irish language and to campaign for greater rights for Irish speaking areas in the area of access to services, broadcasting and ultimately an elected assembly of their own. It was later named Gluaiseacht na Gaeltachta (English: "The Gaeltacht Movement").

== History ==
The organisation continued on where the earlier Muintir na Gaeltachta had left off, but also took inspiration from the contemporary Northern Ireland civil rights movement and the American civil rights movement. Among the founders of the organisation were the writer Máirtín Ó Cadhain and the community and political activists Seósamh Ó Cuaig and Seán Ó Cionnaith.

The Irish Republican Army and Sinn Féin under the leadership of Cathal Goulding and Tomás Mac Giolla played a role in establishment of as part of its policy of the Reconquest of Ireland following on the teachings of James Connolly, who believed that the Irish people required both political and cultural decolonisation.

The campaign was often of a militant nature, such as the placing of nails under the wheels of the car carrying the Taoiseach Jack Lynch in Galway West during the 1969 general election campaign. In that election a member of the campaign, Peadar Mac An Iomaire polled more than 6% of the vote in that constituency.

The campaign had some successes, including the establishment of a nationwide Irish-language radio station RTÉ Raidió na Gaeltachta based in Connemara and of Údarás na Gaeltachta — an elected body responsible for the economic and social development of the Gaeltacht regions but with far less power than envisaged by Gluaiseacht. Three Gluaiseacht candidates stood unsuccessfully in Connemara in the 1979 Údarás election. Gluaiseacht persuaded Conradh na Gaeilge to hold Oireachtas na Gaeilge outside Dublin in 1974, and secured recognition of sean-nós dance in 1977.

== See also ==
- Desmond Fennell
