= County Hall, Galway =

Municipal building in County Galway, Ireland

- Áras an Chontae, Gaillimh
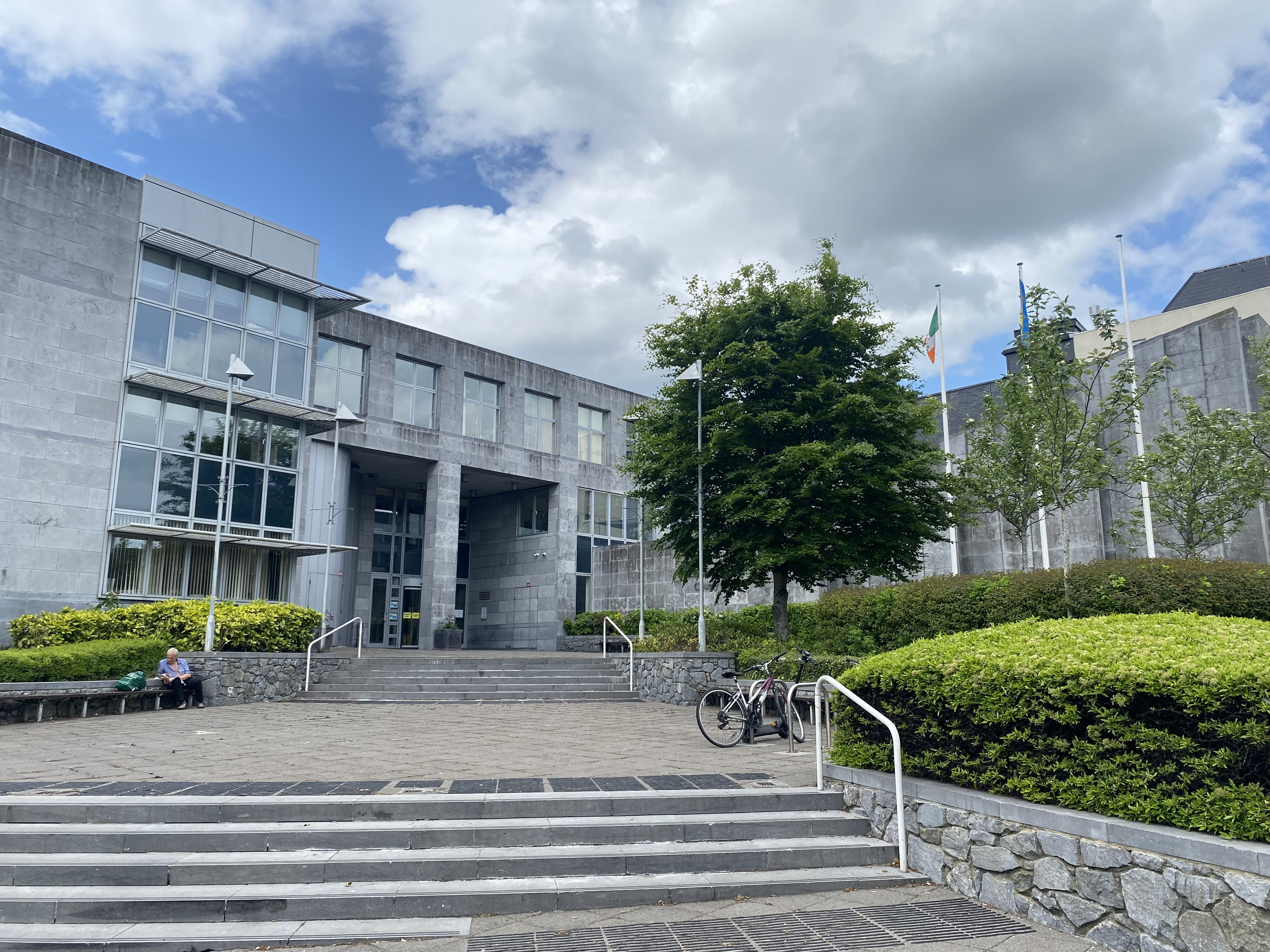
- County Hall

- Location within Ireland

General information
- Location: Galway, County Galway, Ireland
- Coordinates: 53.2764°N 9.0486°W
- Completed: 1999

Design and construction
- Architect: Wejchert Associates

County Hall (Irish: Áras an Chontae, Gaillimh) is a municipal building on Prospect Hill, Galway, County Galway, Ireland.

== History ==
Following the implementation of the Local Government (Ireland) Act 1898, which established county councils in every county, Galway County Council held its first meeting in Tuam. It subsequently acquired the old Galway Infirmary, which dated from 1802 and had closed in 1892, and converted it into a new county headquarters. A modern facility, which was designed by Wejchert Associates, was built on the same site and completed in 1999. Stonework from the old Galway Infirmary was salvaged in order to create features within the new building.
