= Aisling Dolan =

Irish politician (born 1975/1976)

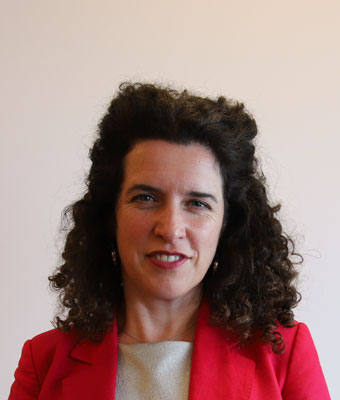

Senator
- In office 29 June 2020 – 31 January 2025
- Constituency: Nominated by the Taoiseach

Personal details
- Born: 1975/1976 (age 50–51) Ballinasloe, County Galway, Ireland
- Party: Fine Gael
- Education: NUI Galway
- Website: Official website

Aisling Dolan (born 1975/1976) is an Irish Fine Gael politician who served as a Senator from June 2020 to January 2025, after being nominated by the Taoiseach.

== Political career ==
Dolan was elected to Galway County Council as an independent candidate at the 2019 local elections. She joined Fine Gael in November 2019.

Dolan was an unsuccessful Fine Gael candidate in the 2020 general election for the Roscommon–Galway constituency. She was appointed to Seanad Éireann in June 2020. Evelyn Francis Parsons was co-opted to Dolan's seat on Galway County Council following her nomination to the Seanad.

Dolan was an unsuccessful Fine Gael candidate in the 2024 general election for Roscommon–Galway. She was not elected at the 2025 Seanad election.

== Personal life ==
Born in Pollboy, Ballinasloe, Dolan attended Ardscoil Mhuire and NUI Galway and received a postgraduate diploma in Applied Languages for Business. Dolan worked in Dublin for Enterprise Ireland and Science Foundation Ireland, supporting Irish businesses and funding excellence in research.
