= Seosamh Ó Cuaig =

Seosamh Ó Cuaig is a native Irish language speaker and activist and member of Galway County Council from Connemara, County Galway. In 1969 he helped found Coiste Cearta Síbialta na Gaeilge, together with members of Sinn Féin. He is a member of Údarás na Gaeltachta, having served from 1989 to 1994, and re-elected in 1999. He works as a journalist and broadcaster with RTÉ Raidió na Gaeltachta. He has been involved in the production of a number of documentaries in Irish for film and television. Often described as an independent Republican socialist, he helped organise the James Connolly Forum in Galway.

He has campaigned against the Lisbon Treaty and for the preservation and development of the cottage in Ros Muc used by Patrick Pearse. He has also spoken in favour of the Rossport Five and the Shell to Sea campaign. Ó Cuaig is also a patron of the People's Movement.

Seosamh was re-elected for the Connemara electoral area at the 2009 Galway County Council election.
