= Shane Curley =

Irish politician

Senator Shane Curley
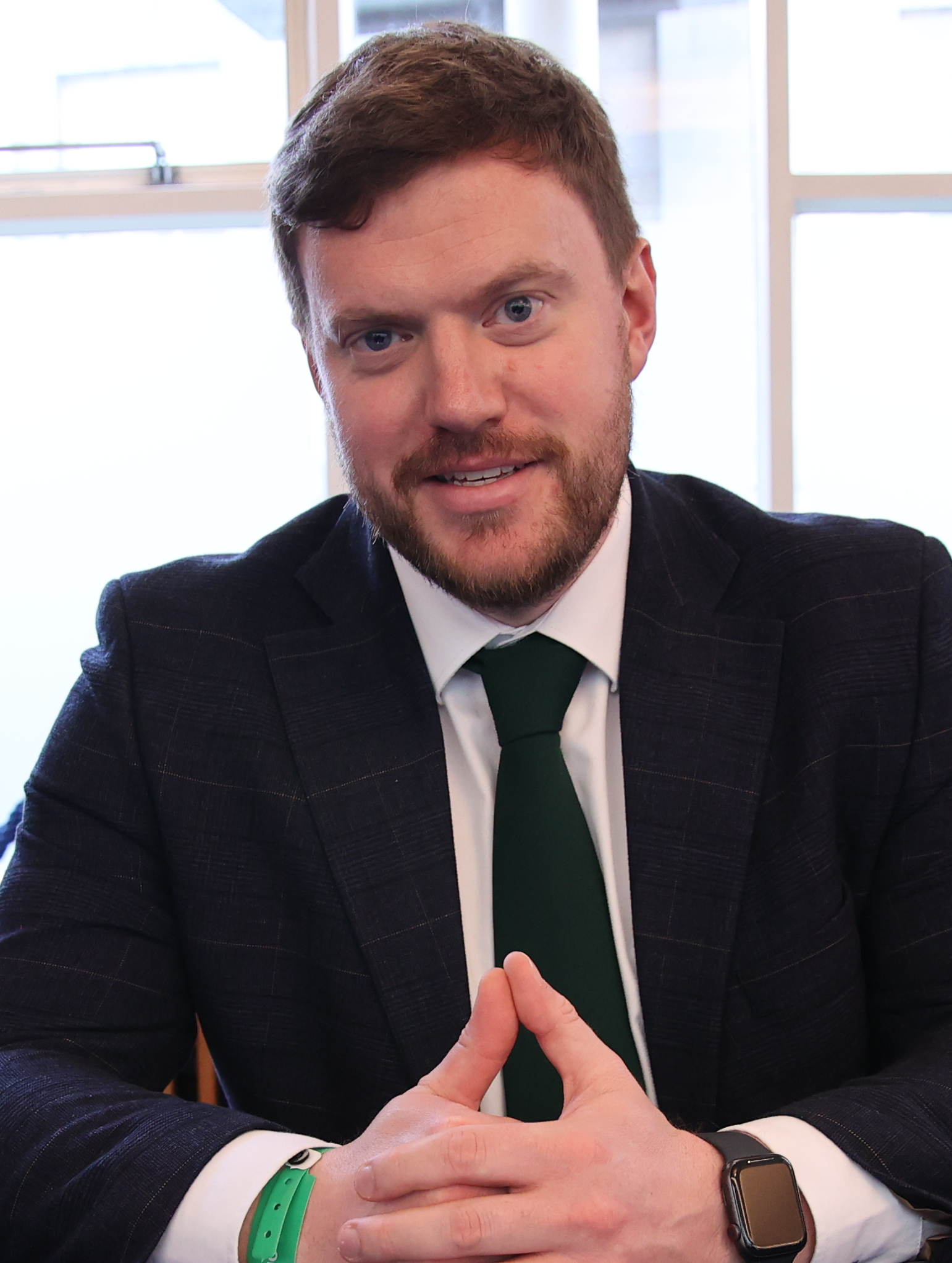
- Curley in 2025

Senator
- Incumbent
- Assumed office January 2025
- Constituency: Cultural and Educational Panel

Personal details
- Party: Fianna Fáil

Shane Curley is an Irish Fianna Fáil politician who has been a senator for the Cultural and Educational Panel since January 2025.

He was a member of Galway County Council for the Loughrea area from 2019 to 2025. He unsuccessfully contested the 2020 Seanad election.

He is a secondary school teacher and a qualified financial advisor.
