= Colm Keaveney =

Irish former politician (born 1971)

Teachta Dála
- In office February 2011 – February 2016
- Constituency: Galway East

Personal details
- Born: 11 January 1971 (age 55) County Galway, Ireland
- Party: Fianna Fáil (since 2013)
- Other political affiliations: Labour Party

Colm Keaveney (born 11 January 1971) is an Irish former Fianna Fáil politician. He was elected as a Labour Party Teachta Dála (TD) for the Galway East constituency at the 2011 general election, He sat as an Independent TD after losing the Labour whip in December 2012. He resigned from the party in June 2013, and joined Fianna Fáil in December 2013. He is a former chairperson of the Labour Party. He lost his seat at the 2016 general election and was elected to Galway County Council in 2019.

== Origins ==
He is originally from the village of Garrafrauns, in north County Galway. He was educated at St. Patrick's school and St Jarlath's College in Tuam.

== Political career ==
Keaveney was an unsuccessful candidate in Galway East at the 1997 general election. He was first elected to Tuam Town Council in the 1999 local elections. In 2004 he was elected to Galway County Council, gaining just under 2,000 votes in the Tuam electoral area.

He is a former SIPTU trade union official and former president of Aontas na Mac Léinn in Éirinn (AMLÉ), formerly the Union of Students in Ireland (USI).

At the 2011 general election, he was elected as the first ever Labour Party TD for the Galway East constituency, taking the last seat on the ninth count with a total poll of 10,126 votes.

At the 2012 Labour Party Conference in Galway, he was elected Chairman of the Labour Party. Following the publication of the 2012 Constituency Commission report, he was listed by The Irish Times as one of 13 TDs most likely to lose their seats in the next election. New boundaries saw Galway East lose a seat and the transfer of 20,500 voters out of the constituency, centred on his home town of Tuam.

On 13 December 2012, he voted against the government on the cut to the respite care grant, which formed part of the 2013 budget; this led to his loss of the Parliamentary Labour Party whip. In a tweet just before the vote in the Dáil, he said "Acta non-verba", Latin for "deeds not words". He remained as Chairman of the Labour Party, as he was elected by the party members. Keaveney resigned from the party on 26 June 2013. Keaveney vocally opposed the government's Protection of Life During Pregnancy Act 2013, both because of the absence of a time limit for termination and because he feared that the "suicide" clause would "normalise" suicide at a time when it was already becoming a serious problem in Ireland. He had previously expressed pro-choice views, telling a Tuam Town Council debate in 2000 that abortion was "the last resort for women and every aspect of a woman's decision should be looked at and taken into consideration" and that anti-abortion literature distributed by colleague Martin Ward was "sickening and offensive".

In December 2013, he joined Fianna Fáil. Keaveney said that Fianna Fáil "... has learned from its mistakes in the past" and he would be a Fianna Fáil candidate at the next general election for Galway East. In response to his application, Labour TD Pat Rabbitte, who had clashed with Keaveney repeatedly, derisively referred to it as "a match made in heaven".

Keaveney's defection was met with opposition from local members of Fianna Fáil in Galway East, particularly from supporters of local TD Michael Kitt and former MEP Mark Killilea. Fianna Fáil leader Michéal Martin was forced to deny rumours that Keaveney would be selected as the sole candidate for the party in the next general election.

He was an unsuccessful Fianna Fáil candidate in the Galway East constituency at the 2016 general election and was elected to the Tuam local electoral area at the 2019 Galway County Council election.

Keaveney did not contest the 2024 Galway County Council election.

== Drug driving ==
On 11 June 2024, Keaveney was charged with driving under the influence of cocaine under an alleged incident that occurred on 12 June 2023. In July 2025, he was banned from driving for 4 years.

In January 2026, Keaveney was sentenced to 220 hours community service and a three year driving ban, after admitting to driving under the influence of cocaine.

Party political offices
Preceded by Brian O'Shea	Chair of the Labour Party; 2012–2013	Succeeded by Lorraine Mulligan

Dáil	Election	Deputy (Party)	Deputy (Party)	Deputy (Party)	Deputy (Party)
9th	1937	Frank Fahy (FF)	Mark Killilea Snr (FF)	Patrick Beegan (FF)	Seán Broderick (FG)
10th	1938	Frank Fahy (FF)	Mark Killilea Snr (FF)	Patrick Beegan (FF)	Seán Broderick (FG)
11th	1943	Frank Fahy (FF)	Mark Killilea Snr (FF)	Patrick Beegan (FF)	Michael Donnellan (CnaT)
12th	1944	Frank Fahy (FF)	Mark Killilea Snr (FF)	Patrick Beegan (FF)	Michael Donnellan (CnaT)
13th	1948	Constituency abolished. See Galway North and Galway South			

Dáil	Election	Deputy (Party)	Deputy (Party)	Deputy (Party)	Deputy (Party)	Deputy (Party)
17th	1961	Michael F. Kitt (FF)	Anthony Millar (FF)	Michael Carty (FF)	Michael Donnellan (CnaT)	Brigid Hogan-O'Higgins (FG)
17th	1964 by-election	Michael F. Kitt (FF)	Anthony Millar (FF)	Michael Carty (FF)	John Donnellan (FG)	Brigid Hogan-O'Higgins (FG)
18th	1965	Michael F. Kitt (FF)	Anthony Millar (FF)	Michael Carty (FF)	John Donnellan (FG)	Brigid Hogan-O'Higgins (FG)
19th	1969	Constituency abolished. See Galway North-East and Clare–South Galway				

Dáil	Election	Deputy (Party)	Deputy (Party)	Deputy (Party)	Deputy (Party)
21st	1977	Johnny Callanan (FF)	Thomas Hussey (FF)	Mark Killilea Jnr (FF)	John Donnellan (FG)
22nd	1981	Johnny Callanan (FF)	Michael P. Kitt (FF)	Paul Connaughton Snr (FG)	3 seats 1981–1997
23rd	1982 (Feb)	Johnny Callanan (FF)	Michael P. Kitt (FF)	Paul Connaughton Snr (FG)	3 seats 1981–1997
23rd	1982 by-election	Noel Treacy (FF)	Michael P. Kitt (FF)	Paul Connaughton Snr (FG)	3 seats 1981–1997
24th	1982 (Nov)	Noel Treacy (FF)	Michael P. Kitt (FF)	Paul Connaughton Snr (FG)	3 seats 1981–1997
25th	1987	Noel Treacy (FF)	Michael P. Kitt (FF)	Paul Connaughton Snr (FG)	3 seats 1981–1997
26th	1989	Noel Treacy (FF)	Michael P. Kitt (FF)	Paul Connaughton Snr (FG)	3 seats 1981–1997
27th	1992	Noel Treacy (FF)	Michael P. Kitt (FF)	Paul Connaughton Snr (FG)	3 seats 1981–1997
28th	1997	Noel Treacy (FF)	Michael P. Kitt (FF)	Paul Connaughton Snr (FG)	Ulick Burke (FG)
29th	2002	Noel Treacy (FF)	Joe Callanan (FF)	Paul Connaughton Snr (FG)	Paddy McHugh (Ind.)
30th	2007	Noel Treacy (FF)	Michael P. Kitt (FF)	Paul Connaughton Snr (FG)	Ulick Burke (FG)
31st	2011	Colm Keaveney (Lab)	Michael P. Kitt (FF)	Ciarán Cannon (FG)	Paul Connaughton Jnr (FG)
32nd	2016	Seán Canney (Ind.)	Anne Rabbitte (FF)	Ciarán Cannon (FG)	3 seats 2016–2024
33rd	2020	Seán Canney (Ind.)	Anne Rabbitte (FF)	Ciarán Cannon (FG)	3 seats 2016–2024
34th	2024	Seán Canney (Ind.)	Albert Dolan (FF)	Peter Roche (FG)	Louis O'Hara (SF)
