= Noel Thomas (politician) =

Irish politician

Galway County Council
- Incumbent
- Assumed office May 2014

Personal details
- Born: 1973 or 1974 Rosscahill, County Galway
- Party: Independent Ireland (since 2024)
- Other political affiliations: Fianna Fáil (until 2024)

Noel Thomas (born 1973 or 1974) is an Irish politician from Gortachalla, County Galway. He has been a member of Galway County Council since 2014, serving first for Fianna Fáil before leaving the party in 2024 following disciplinary action after he claimed "The Inn is full" and stated Ireland should refuse to take any more refugees following an arson attack on a hotel planned to house asylum seekers. Thomas joined Independent Ireland soon after, and stood as the party's candidate in the 2026 Galway West by-election but failed to win the seat.

== Political career ==
=== Fianna Fáil ===
Thomas was first elected at the 2014 Galway County Council election. He came to wider attention in December 2023, following an arson attack on the Ross Lake House Hotel in Rosscahill, which had been earmarked to accommodate 70 asylum seekers. Following the arson attack, Fianna Fáil councillor Seamus Walsh described the attack as a response to a "senseless policy", while Thomas said "the inn is full" and that Ireland should not accept more refugees. Tánaiste and leader of Fianna Fáil Micheál Martin condemned the comments, calling their remarks "absolutely unacceptable" and insisting there was "room at the inn". He stated there was no link between migrants and bad behaviour. The councillors' comments were referred to Fianna Fáil's internal rules and procedures committee for disciplinary consideration. On 6 January 2024, Gardaí searched Thomas's home, and that of Walsh, as part of the investigation into the fire. In January 2024, Thomas claimed there was "political interference" behind the Garda raid on his home.

At a Galway County Council meeting, Thomas accused authorities of acting on external orders, saying the Garda Serious Crime Squad "are getting orders from someone to come and raid our houses". He also criticised Green Party councillor Alastair McKinstry, alleging that McKinstry had implied the two Fianna Fáil councillors had "stoked" local tensions before the fire. Walsh joined in rebuking McKinstry, denouncing both his party and Fianna Fáil's response, and describing the impact on his family as severe. McKinstry rejected the allegations, saying he never accused any councillors personally. He said his earlier motion, which passed in December, simply called on "all community leaders to lead by example and alleviate fears, not stoke them". Gardaí said the searches were conducted to gather evidence related to the suspected arson at the hotel.

=== Independent Ireland ===
In March 2024, Thomas resigned from Fianna Fáil, announcing he would contest the upcoming local elections as an independent. He said that Ireland's main political parties, including Fianna Fáil, Fine Gael, Sinn Féin, and the Greens, had become "very detached from the ordinary people". Thomas linked his departure partly to the disciplinary action which followed his comments on the Ross Lake House Hotel. Thomas said he had not been contacted directly by the party, hearing of the disciplinary process through the media. He claimed he had condemned the arson repeatedly and said he was unfairly targeted over comments he made, including his reference to "the inn being full", which he claimed was taken out of context. He argued that Ireland's accommodation shortages were caused by what he described as "reckless open border policies", a claim challenged by RTÉ host Bryan Dobson, who pointed out that resistance to housing asylum seekers, including arson and blockades, had contributed to the shortage. Thomas denied fuelling fear and said he believed in helping those in need, but insisted the Government must manage the situation "responsibly" to avoid people sleeping rough. In May 2024, Thomas was escorted away from Garda Commissioner Drew Harris during the official opening of An Spidéal Garda Station. Thomas approached the Commissioner while he was speaking to the media, demanding to discuss the previous Garda raid on his home. The incident occurred publicly and was witnessed by reporters, including Galway Bay FM's Sarah Slevin, who later spoke with both Harris and Thomas about the exchange.

In June 2024, Thomas ran for Independent Ireland in the 2024 Galway County Council election, topping the poll in the Connemara South local electoral area. His former Fianna Fáil colleague Seamus Walsh also retained his seat in Connemara North under the same party banner. Later that year, Thomas was selected as Independent Ireland's general election candidate for Galway West, declaring that successive governments had neglected the region and calling for a "reset" in policy. On 29 November 2024, Thomas's father, Noel Thomas Sr, died on polling day during the 2024 general election, which Noel Jr contested in Galway West. Independent Ireland issued a statement expressing condolences to Thomas and his family, describing Noel Thomas Sr. as a respected member of the community who would be "sadly missed". Noel Jr received 9.4% of first-preference votes but was not elected.

==== IRB claims ====
In August 2025, reports emerged that Thomas had attended meetings of a subversive group claiming to be the historical Irish Republican Brotherhood (IRB). The group claims to have established a "shadow government" with its own network of councils and court system. Catherine Callaghan TD criticised Thomas's involvement, saying it was "totally unacceptable" for a public representative to associate with an organisation that purports to act as a parallel government and undermines the Defence Forces. The revelations prompted calls for Independent Ireland to clarify its relationship with Thomas and the group. Local authorities have also reportedly received communications from the IRB claiming that certain decisions must be referred to its councils for consultation.

==== By-election ====
In October 2025, Independent Ireland confirmed that Thomas would contest the 2026 Galway West by-election to fill the Dáil seat vacated by Catherine Connolly on her election as president. Thomas topped the first preference vote but having led the poll for 10 counts, lost the election to Sean Kyne of Fine Gael on the 11th count, after Kyne secured the vast majority of transfers from the Labour Party candidate.
