= Louis O'Hara =

Irish politician (born 1998)

Louis O'Hara TD
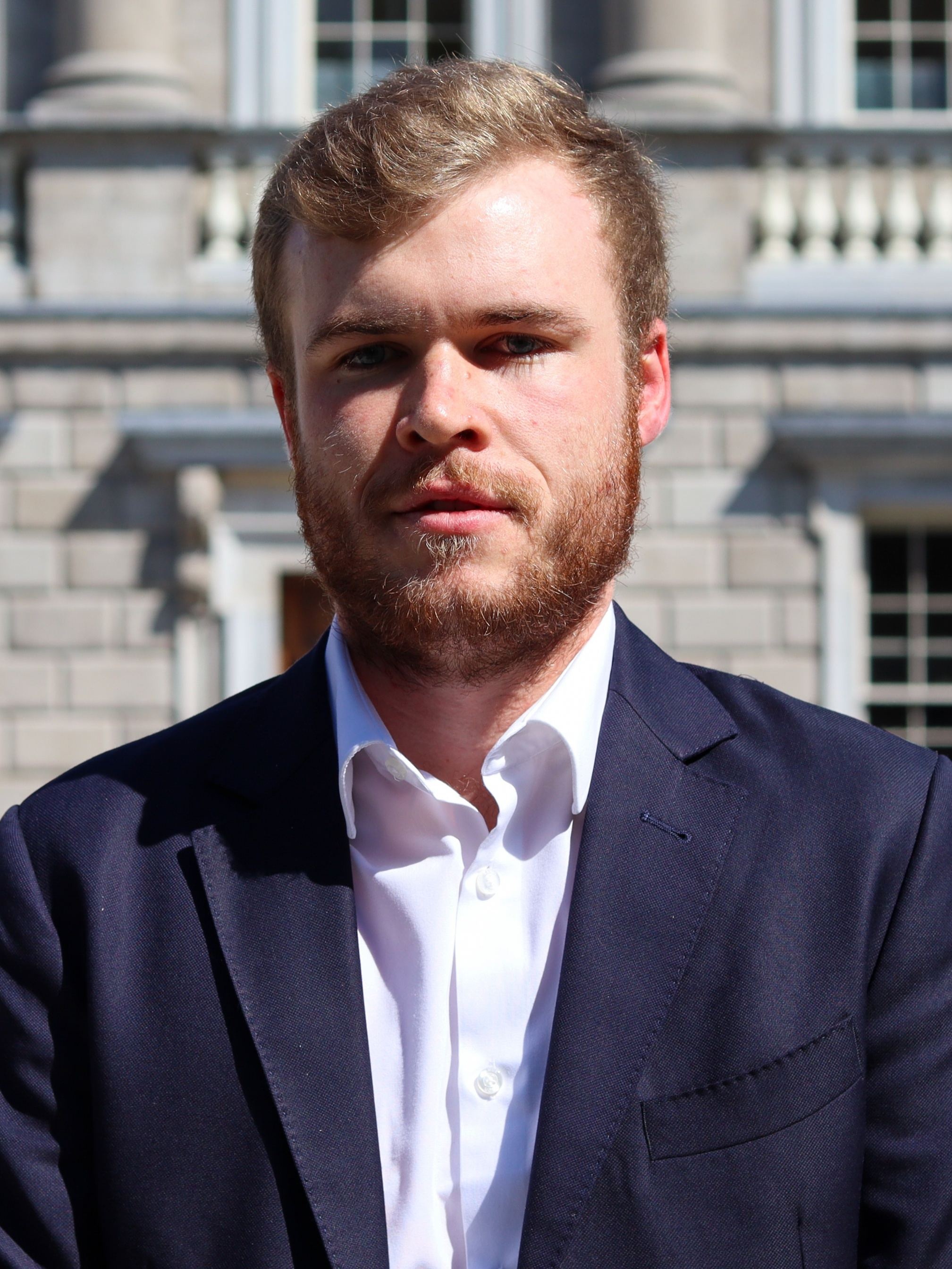
- O'Hara in 2022

Teachta Dála
- Incumbent
- Assumed office November 2024
- Constituency: Galway East

Personal details
- Born: 1997/1998 (age 28–29)
- Party: Sinn Féin
- Education: University of Galway

Louis O'Hara (born 1997/1998) is an Irish Sinn Féin politician who has been a Teachta Dála (TD) for the Galway East constituency since the 2024 general election.

== Early life and education ==
The son of a solicitor, O'Hara is from Cashla, a townland in Athenry civil parish. O'Hara graduated with a Bachelor of Arts in Public and Social Policy and a Master of Arts in Public Activism and Advocacy, both from the University of Galway.

Although O'Hara is the great-grandnephew of Thomas O'Donnell, a nationalist MP for Kerry who was the first person to speak Irish in the British House of Commons, he has described his family as not overtly political and more from "the Fine Gael tradition" than his Sinn Féin background.

== Political career ==
O'Hara joined Sinn Féin at the age of 17, stating he was drawn in by the party's focus on representing young people.

O'Hara stood unsuccessfully at the 2019 local elections to Galway County Council. At the 2020 general election, aged 22 and still a student at University of Galway, O'Hara lost out to Anne Rabbitte of Fianna Fáil.

Following the election of Sinn Féin's Midlands North West MEP Matt Carthy as TD for Cavan-Monaghan in February 2020 and his replacement as MEP by Chris MacManus of Sligo, O'Hara became constituency manager for MacManus, a role he held until the 2024 general election.

In 2020 O'Hara criticised Sinn Féin's Northern Ireland Finance Minister Conor Murphy after Murphy stated that Paul Quinn, who was murdered in 2007, was involved in smuggling and criminality.

O'Hara was elected at the 2024 local elections to Galway County Council for the Athenry–Oranmore area.

At the 2024 general election, O'Hara was elected Teachta Dála for the Galway East constituency, having won 14% of the first preference vote. In a party selection convention held shortly after the general election, Martin McNamara was selected to replace O'Hara on Galway County Council as a Sinn Féin councillor representing the Athenry-Oranmore local electoral area.

== Political views ==
O'Hara describes himself as a republican and left-wing politician whose politics are centred on Irish unity, social justice, and economic equality. He has said he joined Sinn Féin because of its positions on republicanism, reunification, and social policy.

On constitutional issues, O'Hara strongly supports Irish unification and argues that political authority over Northern Ireland should not remain within the British state. He believes the Irish Government should actively prepare for a future border poll through mechanisms such as a Citizens' Assembly, an Oireachtas committee, and formal planning documents outlining how a united Ireland would function institutionally and economically.

Economically, O'Hara advocates greater state investment in housing and infrastructure. He argues that the Irish housing crisis of the 2020s stems from inadequate public housing delivery and insufficient investment in infrastructure. He supports expanded affordable and public housing construction, as well as infrastructure improvements to facilitate private development. On cost-of-living issues, he criticises the Fine Gael/Fianna Fáil government of the 2020s as disconnected from the financial pressures facing households. He opposed the removal of temporary cost-of-living supports such as energy credits and argued that disabled people were disproportionately negatively affected by recent budgetary changes.

In transport policy, O'Hara supports expanding public transport infrastructure, particularly rail. He has campaigned for the reopening and expansion of the Western Rail Corridor and supports upgrades to Galway rail infrastructure, including double-tracking lines into Galway City. He also supports major road infrastructure projects, such as the Galway outer ring road to address congestion.

On the European Union, O'Hara supports continued EU membership but argues that the EU has acquired excessive influence over Irish decision-making in some areas. He cites EU migration policy and the Mercosur trade agreement as examples where he believes Irish national interests were overridden by EU-level decision-making.

Dáil	Election	Deputy (Party)	Deputy (Party)	Deputy (Party)	Deputy (Party)
9th	1937	Frank Fahy (FF)	Mark Killilea Snr (FF)	Patrick Beegan (FF)	Seán Broderick (FG)
10th	1938	Frank Fahy (FF)	Mark Killilea Snr (FF)	Patrick Beegan (FF)	Seán Broderick (FG)
11th	1943	Frank Fahy (FF)	Mark Killilea Snr (FF)	Patrick Beegan (FF)	Michael Donnellan (CnaT)
12th	1944	Frank Fahy (FF)	Mark Killilea Snr (FF)	Patrick Beegan (FF)	Michael Donnellan (CnaT)
13th	1948	Constituency abolished. See Galway North and Galway South			

Dáil	Election	Deputy (Party)	Deputy (Party)	Deputy (Party)	Deputy (Party)	Deputy (Party)
17th	1961	Michael F. Kitt (FF)	Anthony Millar (FF)	Michael Carty (FF)	Michael Donnellan (CnaT)	Brigid Hogan-O'Higgins (FG)
17th	1964 by-election	Michael F. Kitt (FF)	Anthony Millar (FF)	Michael Carty (FF)	John Donnellan (FG)	Brigid Hogan-O'Higgins (FG)
18th	1965	Michael F. Kitt (FF)	Anthony Millar (FF)	Michael Carty (FF)	John Donnellan (FG)	Brigid Hogan-O'Higgins (FG)
19th	1969	Constituency abolished. See Galway North-East and Clare–South Galway				

Dáil	Election	Deputy (Party)	Deputy (Party)	Deputy (Party)	Deputy (Party)
21st	1977	Johnny Callanan (FF)	Thomas Hussey (FF)	Mark Killilea Jnr (FF)	John Donnellan (FG)
22nd	1981	Johnny Callanan (FF)	Michael P. Kitt (FF)	Paul Connaughton Snr (FG)	3 seats 1981–1997
23rd	1982 (Feb)	Johnny Callanan (FF)	Michael P. Kitt (FF)	Paul Connaughton Snr (FG)	3 seats 1981–1997
23rd	1982 by-election	Noel Treacy (FF)	Michael P. Kitt (FF)	Paul Connaughton Snr (FG)	3 seats 1981–1997
24th	1982 (Nov)	Noel Treacy (FF)	Michael P. Kitt (FF)	Paul Connaughton Snr (FG)	3 seats 1981–1997
25th	1987	Noel Treacy (FF)	Michael P. Kitt (FF)	Paul Connaughton Snr (FG)	3 seats 1981–1997
26th	1989	Noel Treacy (FF)	Michael P. Kitt (FF)	Paul Connaughton Snr (FG)	3 seats 1981–1997
27th	1992	Noel Treacy (FF)	Michael P. Kitt (FF)	Paul Connaughton Snr (FG)	3 seats 1981–1997
28th	1997	Noel Treacy (FF)	Michael P. Kitt (FF)	Paul Connaughton Snr (FG)	Ulick Burke (FG)
29th	2002	Noel Treacy (FF)	Joe Callanan (FF)	Paul Connaughton Snr (FG)	Paddy McHugh (Ind.)
30th	2007	Noel Treacy (FF)	Michael P. Kitt (FF)	Paul Connaughton Snr (FG)	Ulick Burke (FG)
31st	2011	Colm Keaveney (Lab)	Michael P. Kitt (FF)	Ciarán Cannon (FG)	Paul Connaughton Jnr (FG)
32nd	2016	Seán Canney (Ind.)	Anne Rabbitte (FF)	Ciarán Cannon (FG)	3 seats 2016–2024
33rd	2020	Seán Canney (Ind.)	Anne Rabbitte (FF)	Ciarán Cannon (FG)	3 seats 2016–2024
34th	2024	Seán Canney (Ind.)	Albert Dolan (FF)	Peter Roche (FG)	Louis O'Hara (SF)
