= P. J. Murphy =

Irish politician

Senator P. J. Murphy
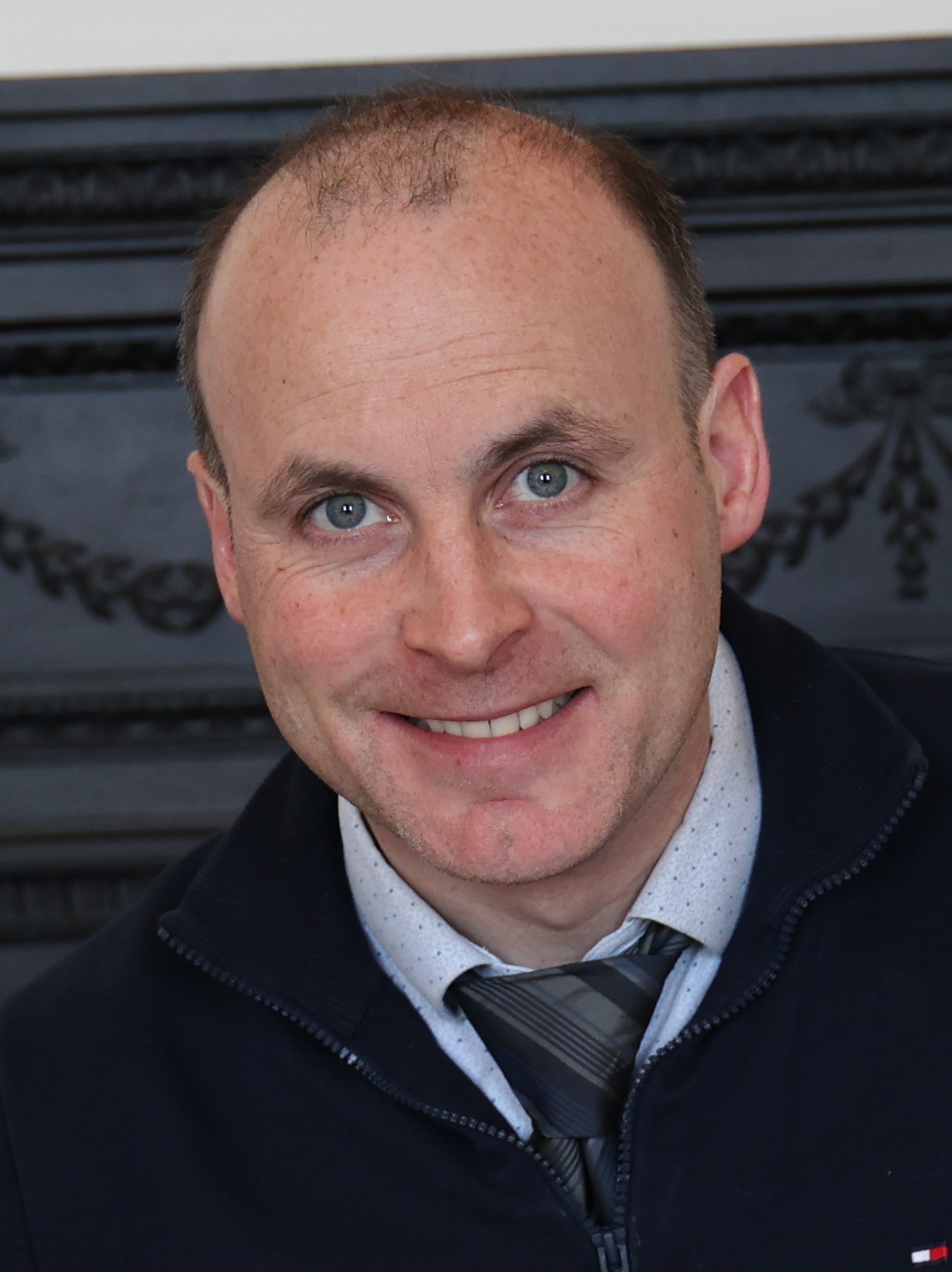
- Murphy in 2025

Senator
- Incumbent
- Assumed office January 2025
- Constituency: Agricultural Panel

Personal details
- Party: Fine Gael

P. J. Murphy is an Irish Fine Gael politician who has been a senator for the Agricultural Panel since January 2025.

He was a member of Galway County Council for the Gort–Kinvara area from May 2019 to January 2025.
