= Jarlath McDonagh =

Irish politician (born 1945)

Senator
- In office 17 February 1993 – 12 September 2002
- Constituency: Labour Panel

Personal details
- Born: 1 June 1945 (age 79); County Galway, Ireland
- Political party: Fine Gael

Jarlath McDonagh (born 1 June 1945) is a former Fine Gael politician from County Galway in Ireland.

A former teacher, McDonagh was a senator from 1993 to 2002, elected on the Labour Panel. He was a member of Galway County Council for the Oranmore electoral area since the 1980s, and retired at the 2014 local elections.
