= Michael Mullins (politician) =

Irish politician (born 1953)

Senator
- In office 25 May 2011 – 8 June 2016
- Constituency: Cultural and Educational Panel

Personal details
- Born: 22 February 1953 (age 73) Galway, Ireland
- Party: Fine Gael

Michael Mullins (born 22 February 1953) is an Irish former Fine Gael politician. He was elected to Seanad Éireann on the Cultural and Educational Panel in April 2011. He was a member of Galway County Council from 1985 to 2011 representing Ballinasloe.

An unsuccessful candidate for the Galway East at the 1992 general election. He was the Fine Gael Seanad spokesperson on Foreign Affairs and Trade and a former human resources manager. He is a first cousin of independent senator Rónán Mullen.
