= Galway County Council =

Local authority for County Galway, Ireland

Galway County Council Comhairle Chontae na Gaillimhe
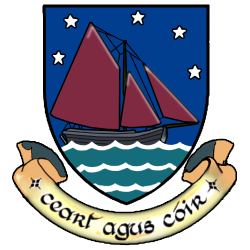

Type
- Type: County council of County Galway

History
- Founded: 1 April 1899

Leadership
- Cathaoirleach: Andrew Reddington, FG

Structure
- Seats: 39
- Political groups: Fine Gael (14) Fianna Fáil (11) Independent Ireland (6) Sinn Féin (2) Independent (6) (Note: Tomás Ó Curraoin is a member of the unregistered Republican Sinn Féin party and therefore sits as an independent on the council, and appeared as so on the 2024 ballot paper.)
- Length of term: 5 years

Elections
- Last election: 7 June 2024

Motto
- Irish: Ceart agus Cóir "Righteousness and Justice"

Meeting place
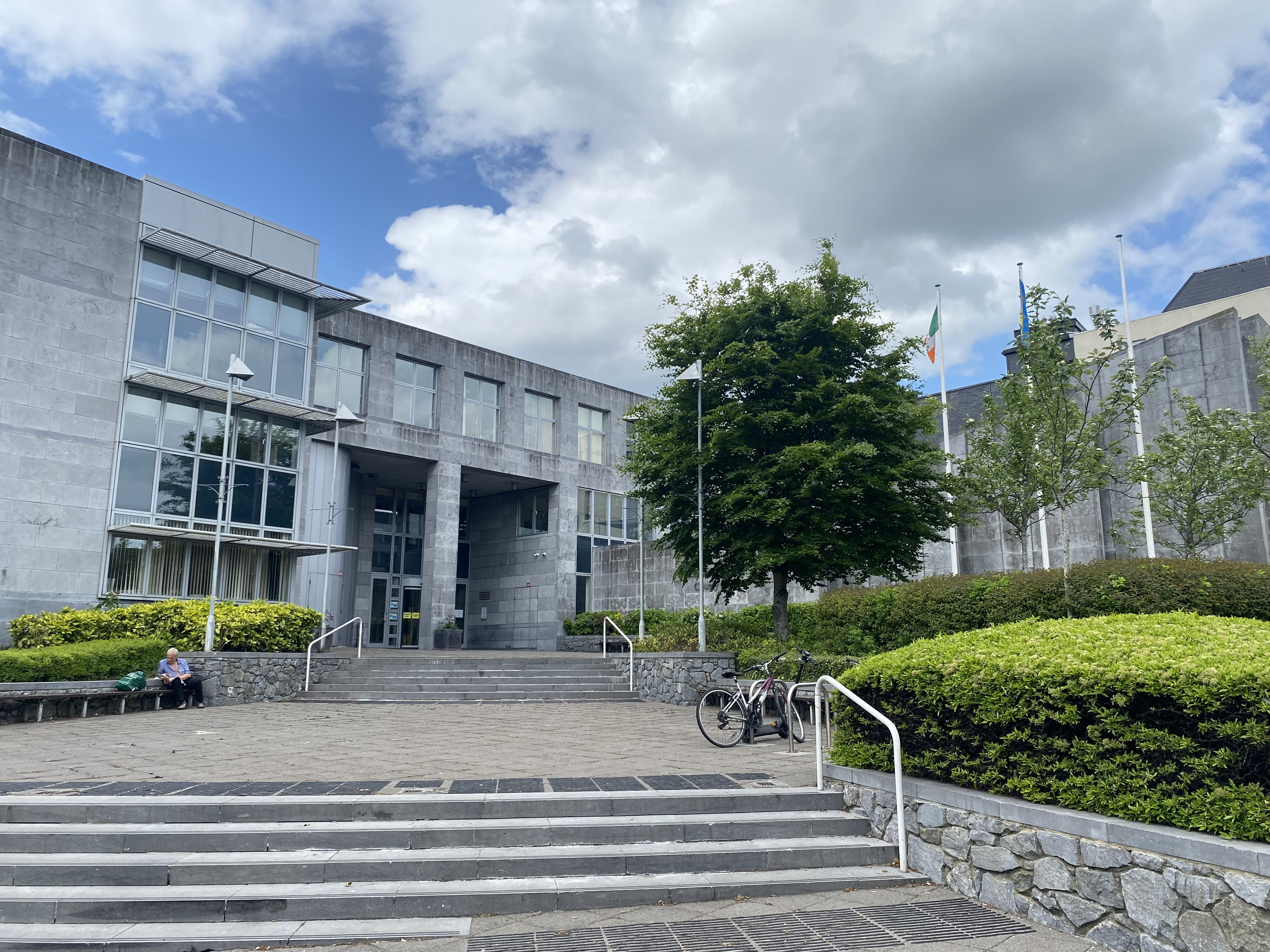
- Áras an Chontae, Galway

Website
- Official website

Galway County Council (Irish: Comhairle Chontae na Gaillimhe) is the local authority of County Galway, Ireland. As a county council, it is governed by the Local Government Act 2001. The council is responsible for housing and community, roads and transportation, urban planning and development, amenity and culture, environment, and local fire services. The council has 39 elected members. Elections are held every five years and are by single transferable vote. The head of the council has the title of Cathaoirleach (chairperson). The county administration is headed by a chief executive, Liam Conneally. The county seat is at Áras an Chontae (County Hall) in Galway city.

== History ==
Galway County Council was established on 1 April 1899 under the Local Government (Ireland) Act 1898 for the administrative county of County Galway. This area was that of the former judicial county of Galway, except the district electoral divisions of Drummaan, Inishcaltra North, Mountshannon, and Rosmoylan (which became part of County Clare) and the district electoral divisions of Ballinchalla and Owenbrin (which became part of County Mayo); the part of the judicial county of Roscommon which was in the town of Ballinasloe; and the judicial county of the town of Galway.

It took over the local administration which had been carried out by county grand juries and county-at-large presentment sessions, which included the maintenance of highways and bridges, the upkeep of lunatic asylums, and the appointment of coroners. The new council also took over some duties from the poor law boards of guardians in relation to diseases of cattle and from the justices of the peace to regulate explosives.

From 1986, Galway City Council has governed the city of Galway as a separate local government area from the rest of the county.

The County Council initially met in Tuam. It subsequently acquired the old Galway Infirmary and converted it into a new county headquarters. A modern facility, known as County Hall, was built on the same site and completed in 1999.

== Regional Assembly ==
Galway County Council has three representatives on the Northern and Western Regional Assembly who are part of the West Strategic Planning Area Committee.

== Elections ==
The Local Government (Ireland) Act 1919 introduced the electoral system of proportional representation by means of the single transferable vote (PR-STV) for the 1920 Irish local elections. This electoral system has been retained, with members of Galway County Council elected for a five-year term of office from multi-member local electoral areas (LEAs).

Year	FF	FG	II	SF	GP	RSF	Lab	PDs	CnaP	CnaT	RA	FP	CnaG	Rep	SF (pre-1922)	U	IrishNat	Ind.	Total
2024	11	13	6	2	0	1	0	—N/a	—N/a	—N/a	0	—N/a	—N/a	—N/a	—N/a	0	—N/a	7	39
2019	15	11	—N/a	1	1	1	0	—N/a	—N/a	—N/a	0	—N/a	—N/a	—N/a	—N/a	0	—N/a	10	39
2014	12	12	—N/a	3	0	1	0	—N/a	—N/a	—N/a	0	—N/a	—N/a	—N/a	—N/a	0	—N/a	11	39
2009	7	13	—N/a	1	0	1	1	—N/a	—N/a	—N/a	0	—N/a	—N/a	—N/a	—N/a	0	—N/a	7	30
2004	10	10	—N/a	1	0	0	1	3	—N/a	—N/a	0	—N/a	—N/a	—N/a	—N/a	0	—N/a	5	30
1999	16	9	—N/a	0	0	0	0	2	—N/a	—N/a	0	—N/a	—N/a	—N/a	—N/a	0	—N/a	3	30
1991	14	10	—N/a	0	0	0	0	4	—N/a	—N/a	0	—N/a	—N/a	—N/a	—N/a	0	—N/a	2	30
1985	17	9	—N/a	1	0	—N/a	0	—N/a	—N/a	—N/a	0	—N/a	—N/a	—N/a	—N/a	0	—N/a	3	30
1979	15	11	—N/a	2	—N/a	—N/a	1	—N/a	—N/a	—N/a	0	—N/a	—N/a	—N/a	—N/a	0	—N/a	2	31
1974	16	9	—N/a	2	—N/a	—N/a	1	—N/a	—N/a	—N/a	0	—N/a	—N/a	—N/a	—N/a	0	—N/a	3	31
1967	16	10	—N/a	2	—N/a	—N/a	0	—N/a	1	—N/a	0	—N/a	—N/a	—N/a	—N/a	0	—N/a	2 (Note: Includes 1 Galway Chamber of Commerce Candidate)	31
1960	17	7	—N/a	1	—N/a	—N/a	1	—N/a	1	3	0	—N/a	—N/a	—N/a	—N/a	0	—N/a	1	31
1955	16	7	—N/a	1	—N/a	—N/a	0	—N/a	1	4	0	—N/a	—N/a	—N/a	—N/a	0	—N/a	2	31
1950	17	6	—N/a	0	—N/a	—N/a	1	—N/a	1	3	0	—N/a	—N/a	—N/a	—N/a	0	—N/a	3	31
1945	17	0	—N/a	0	—N/a	—N/a	1	—N/a	—N/a	6	0	—N/a	—N/a	—N/a	—N/a	0	—N/a	7	31
1942	12	2	—N/a	0	—N/a	—N/a	1	—N/a	—N/a	8	1	—N/a	—N/a	—N/a	—N/a	0	—N/a	7	31
1934	12	11	—N/a	0	—N/a	—N/a	0	—N/a	—N/a	—N/a	0	0	—N/a	—N/a	—N/a	0	—N/a	1 (Note: Includes 1 Independent Republican)	24
1928	8	—N/a	—N/a	0	—N/a	—N/a	1	—N/a	—N/a	—N/a	3	3	10	2	—N/a	0	—N/a	5	32
1925	—N/a	—N/a	—N/a	—N/a	—N/a	—N/a	1	—N/a	—N/a	—N/a	0	11	11	12	—N/a	0	—N/a	5	40
1920	—N/a	—N/a	—N/a	—N/a	—N/a	—N/a	0	—N/a	—N/a	—N/a	0	—N/a	—N/a	—N/a	20	0	0	0	20
1914	—N/a	—N/a	—N/a	—N/a	—N/a	—N/a		—N/a	—N/a	—N/a		—N/a	—N/a	—N/a					20
1911	—N/a	—N/a	—N/a	—N/a	—N/a	—N/a		—N/a	—N/a	—N/a		—N/a	—N/a	—N/a					20
1908	—N/a	—N/a	—N/a	—N/a	—N/a	—N/a		—N/a	—N/a	—N/a		—N/a	—N/a	—N/a					20
1905	—N/a	—N/a	—N/a	—N/a	—N/a	—N/a		—N/a	—N/a	—N/a		—N/a	—N/a	—N/a					20
1902	—N/a	—N/a	—N/a	—N/a	—N/a	—N/a		—N/a	—N/a	—N/a		—N/a	—N/a	—N/a	—N/a				20
1899	—N/a	—N/a	—N/a	—N/a	—N/a	—N/a		—N/a	—N/a	—N/a		—N/a	—N/a	—N/a	—N/a	1	19	0	20

== Local electoral areas and municipal districts ==
The area governed by the council

County Galway is divided into the following LEAs and municipal districts, defined by electoral divisions.

Municipal District	LEA	Definition	Seats
Athenry	Athenry–Oranmore	Abbey East, An Carn Mór, Athenry, Aughrim (in the former Rural District of Galway), Baile an Teampaill, Baile Chláir, Belleville, Cappalusk, Ceathrú an Bhrúnaigh, Cloonkeen (in the former Rural District of Loughrea), Deerpark, Eanach Dhúin, Graigabbey, Greethill, Killimor (in the former Rural District of Loughrea), Leacach Beag, Liscananaun, Lisín an Bhealaigh, Monivea, Oranmore, Ryehill, Stradbally and Tiaquin.	7
Ballinasloe		Ahascragh, Annagh, Aughrim (in the former Rural District of Ballinasloe), Ballinasloe Rural, Ballinasloe Urban, Ballinastack, Ballymacward, Ballymoe, Ballynakill (in the former Rural District of Glenamaddy), Ballynakill (in the former Rural District of Mountbellew), Boyounagh, Caltra, Castleblakeney, Castleffrench, Clonbrock, Clonfert, Clontuskert, Cloonkeen (in the former Rural District of Mountbellew), Cloonkeen (in the former Rural District of Tuam), Colmanstown, Cooloo, Creggs, Curraghmore, Derryglassaun, Glennamaddy, Island, Kellysgrove, Kilconnell, Kilcroan, Killaan, Killallaghtan, Killeroran, Killian, Killure, Kilmacshane, Kiltullagh (in the former Rural District of Glenamaddy), Kylemore, Laurencetown, Lismanny, Mount Bellew, Mounthazel, Raheen, Scregg, Shankill, Taghboy, Templetogher and Toberroe.	6
Conamara	Conamara North	Abhainn Ghabhla, An Chorr, An Cnoc Buí, An Fhairche, An Ros, An Turlach, An Uillinn, Ballynakill (in the former Rural District of Clifden), Binn an Choire, Bunowen, Camas, Cill Chuimín (in the former Rural District of Oughterard), Cleggan, Clifden, Cloch na Rón, Conga, Cushkillary, Derrycunlagh, Derrylea, Doonloughan, Errislannan, Inishbofin, Leitir Breacáin, Letterfore, Maíros, Oughterard, Rinvyle, Scainimh, Sillerna and Wormhole.	4
Conamara	Conamara South	An Crompán, An Spidéal, Árainn, Bearna, Cill Aithnín, Gaillimh (Tuath) Garmna, Cill Chuimín (in the former Rural District of Galway), Leitir Móir, Maigh Cuilinn, Na Forbacha, Sailearna, Sliabh an Aonaigh and Tulaigh Mhic Aodháin	5
Loughrea	Gort–Kinvara	Ardamullivan, Ardrahan, Ballycahalan, Ballynacourty, Beagh, Cahermore, Cappard, Castleboy, Castletaylor, Clarinbridge, Craughwell, Derrylaur, Doorus, Drumacoo, Gort, Kilbeacanty, Kilchreest, Killeely, Killeenavarra, Killinny, Killogilleen, Kiltartan, Kilthomas, Kinvarra, Rahasane and Skehanagh.	5
Loughrea	Loughrea	Abbeygormacan, Abbeyville, Aille, Ballyglass, Ballynagar, Bracklagh, Bullaun, Coos, Derrew, Drumkeary, Drummin, Eyrecourt, Grange, Kilconickny, Kilconierin, Killimor (in the former Rural District of Portumna), Killoran, Kilmalinoge, Kilmeen, Kilquain, Kilreekill, Kilteskill, Kiltormer, Kiltullagh (in the former Rural District of Loughrea), Lackalea, Leitrim, Loughatorick, Loughrea Rural, Loughrea Urban, Marblehill, Meelick, Moat, Mountain, Moyode, Oatfield, Pallas, Portumna, Raford, Tiranascragh, Tynagh and Woodford.	5
Tuam		Abbey West, Addergoole, Annaghdown, Ballinderry, Ballinduff, Ballynapark, Beaghmore, Belclare, Carrownagur, Carrowrevagh, Claretuam, Clonbern, Cummer, Donaghpatrick, Doonbally, Dunmore North, Dunmore South, Foxhall, Headford, Hillsbrook, Kilbennan, Kilcoona, Killeany, Killeen, Killererin, Killower, Killursa, Kilmoylan, Kilshanvy, Levally, Milltown, Moyne, Toberadosh, Tuam Rural and Tuam Urban.	7

== Councillors ==
The following were elected at the 2024 Galway County Council election.

=== 2024 seats summary ===
Party	Seats
Fine Gael	13
Fianna Fáil	11
Independent Ireland	6
Sinn Féin	2
Independent	7

=== Councillors by electoral area ===
This list reflects the order in which councillors were elected on 7 June 2024.

Council members from 2024 election
Local electoral area	Name	Party
Athenry–Oranmore	Albert Dolan (Note: Replaced during term, see table below for details.)	Fianna Fáil
Athenry–Oranmore	Tomás Grealish	Independent
Athenry–Oranmore	David Collins	Fine Gael
Athenry–Oranmore	James Charity (Note: Changed party, see table for details.)	Independent
Athenry–Oranmore	Peter Feeney	Fine Gael
Athenry–Oranmore	Cillian Keane	Fianna Fáil
Athenry–Oranmore	Louis O'Hara	Sinn Féin
Ballinasloe	Michael Connolly	Fianna Fáil
Ballinasloe	Declan Geraghty	Independent Ireland
Ballinasloe	Alan Harney	Fine Gael
Ballinasloe	Evelyn Parsons	Independent
Ballinasloe	Dermot Connolly	Sinn Féin
Ballinasloe	Peter Keaveney	Fine Gael
Conamara North	Thomas Welby	Independent
Conamara North	Séamus Walsh	Independent Ireland
Conamara North	Gerry King	Fianna Fáil
Conamara North	Eileen Mannion	Fine Gael
Conamara South	Noel Thomas	Independent Ireland
Conamara South	Pádraig Mac an Iomaire	Fine Gael
Conamara South	Tomás Ó Curraoin	Independent
Conamara South	Michael Leainde	Independent Ireland
Conamara South	Máirtín Lee	Fianna Fáil
Gort–Kinvara	Geraldine Donohue	Independent
Gort–Kinvara	Martina Kinane	Fianna Fáil
Gort–Kinvara	P. J. Murphy	Fine Gael
Gort–Kinvara	Paul Killilea	Fine Gael
Gort–Kinvara	Gerry Finnerty	Fianna Fáil
Loughrea	Shane Curley	Fianna Fáil
Loughrea	Declan Kelly	Independent Ireland
Loughrea	Jimmy McClearn	Fine Gael
Loughrea	Michael 'Moegie' Maher	Fine Gael
Loughrea	Ivan Canning	Fianna Fáil
Tuam	Andrew Reddington	Fine Gael
Tuam	Peter Roche	Fine Gael
Tuam	Mary Hoade	Fianna Fáil
Tuam	Shaun Cunniffe	Independent Ireland
Tuam	Donagh Mark Killilea	Fianna Fáil
Tuam	Karey McHugh Farag	Independent
Tuam	Ollie Turner	Fine Gael

==== Co-options ====
Party	Outgoing	LEA	Reason	Date	Co-optee
Sinn Féin	Louis O'Hara	Athenry–Oranmore	Elected to 34th Dáil at the 2024 general election	11 December 2024	Martin McNamara
Fianna Fáil	Albert Dolan	Athenry–Oranmore	Elected to 34th Dáil at the 2024 general election	16 December 2024	Seán Broderick
Fine Gael	Peter Roche	Tuam	Elected to 34th Dáil at the 2024 general election	12 December 2024	Siobhan McHugh
Fianna Fáil	Shane Curley	Loughrea	Elected to 27th Seanad at the 2025 Seanad election	24 March 2025	Michael Regan
Fine Gael	P. J. Murphy	Gort–Kinvara	Elected to 27th Seanad at the 2025 Seanad election	January 2025	Laurie Harney

==== Changes in affiliation ====
Name	LEA	Elected as	New affiliation	Date
James Charity	Athenry-Oranmore	Independent	Fine Gael	11 March 2025
Martin McNamara	Athenry-Oranmore	Sinn Féin	Independent	29 April 2026
