= Clare–South Galway =

Dáil constituency (1969–1977)

- Former Dáil constituency

Former constituency
- Created: 1969
- Abolished: 1977
- Seats: 3
- Local government areas: County Clare; County Galway; County Roscommon
- Created from: Clare; Galway East
- Replaced by: Clare; Galway East; Galway West

Clare–South Galway was a parliamentary constituency represented in Dáil Éireann, the lower house of the Irish parliament or Oireachtas from 1969 to 1977. The constituency elected 3 deputies (Teachtaí Dála, commonly known as TDs) to the Dáil on the system of proportional representation by means of the single transferable vote (PR-STV).

== History ==
The constituency was created under the Electoral (Amendment) Act 1969 and was first used at the 1969 general election to the 19th Dáil. It was used again at the 1973 general election to the 20th Dáil.

Clare–South Galway was abolished under the Electoral (Amendment) Act 1974, the next revision of constituencies, with effect from the 1977 general election. The areas in County Clare were incorporated into the existing Clare constituency, while the Galway territories were divided between the two new constituencies of Galway East and Galway West. The new constituency of Galway West included a different part of County Clare.

== Boundaries ==
The Clare part of the constituency had been included since 1923 in the Clare constituency. However, it was only a small area of County Clare (a sparsely populated part of the mountainous area in the north-east of the county centered around Tulla). Clare–South Galway also included a small part of County Roscommon.

It was defined in the 1969 Act as:

"In the administrative county of Clare, the district electoral divisions of:

Ballynahinch, Caher, Glendree, Killanena, Kiltannon, Loughea, Newgrove, Rathclooney, Toberbreeda, Tulla, in the former Rural District of Tulla;

and, in the administrative county of Galway, the district electoral division of:

Abbeygormacan, Aughrim, Ballinasloe Rural Clonfert, Clontuskert, Kellysgrove, Kilconnell, Killaan, Killallaghtan, Killoran, Kilmacshane, Kiltormer, Kylemore, Laurencetown, Lismanny, Oatfield, in the former Rural District of Ballinasloe No. 1;
Ballynacourty, Clarinbridge, Stradbally, in the former Rural District of Galway;
Ardamullivan, Ardrahan, Ballycahalan, Beagh, Cahermore, Cappard, Castletaylor, Doorus Drumacoo, Gort, Kilbeacanty, Killeely, Killeenavarra, Killinny, Kiltartan, Kilthomas, Kinvarra, Rahasane, Skehanagh, in the former Rural District of Gort;
Aille, Ballynagar, Bracklagh, Bullaun, Castleboy, Craughwell, Derrylaur, Drumkeary, Grange, Kilchreest, Kilconickny, Kilconierin, Killogilleen, Kilmeen, Kilreekill, Kilteskill, Kiltullagh, Lackalea, Leitrim, Loughatorick, Loughrea Rural, Loughrea Urban, Marblehill, Mountain, Moyode, Raford, Woodford, in the former Rural District of Loughrea;
Abbeyville, Ballyglass, Coos, Derrew, Drummin, Eyrecourt, Killimor, Kilmalinoge, Kilnquain, Meelick, Moat, Pallas, Portumna, Tiranascragh, Tynagh, in the former Rural District of Portumna;
and the urban district of Ballinasloe;

and, in the administrative county of Roscommon,

the district electoral divisions of: Ballydangan, Cloonburren, Creagh, Culliagh, Moore, in the former Rural District of Athlone No. 2.

== TDs ==
Teachtaí Dála (TDs) for Clare–South Galway 1969–1977
Key to parties: FF = Fianna Fáil; FG = Fine Gael
Dáil	Election	Deputy (Party)	Deputy (Party)	Deputy (Party)
19th	1969	Bill Loughnane (FF)	Michael Carty (FF)	Brigid Hogan-O'Higgins (FG)
20th	1973	Bill Loughnane (FF)	Johnny Callanan (FF)	Brigid Hogan-O'Higgins (FG)
21st	1977	Constituency abolished. See Galway East, Galway West and Clare		

Note: The columns in this table are used only for presentational purposes, and no significance should be attached to the order of columns. For details of the order in which seats were won at each election, see the detailed results of that election.

== Elections ==
*: Outgoing TD

=== 1973 general election ===
1973 general election: Clare–South Galway
Party	Candidate	FPv%	Count			
Party	Candidate	FPv%	1	2	3	4
Fianna Fáil	Bill Loughnane	26.5	6,956			
Fine Gael	Brigid Hogan-O'Higgins	19.3	5,084	5,541	6,640	
Fianna Fáil	Johnny Callanan	19.0	5,005	5,141	5,202	7,815
Fianna Fáil	Hugh Melvin	11.7	3,072	3,305	3,333	
Fine Gael	Toddie Byrne	9.9	2,609	2,857	3,856	4,025
Fine Gael	Patrick Bugler	8.6	2,273	2,334		
Independent	Norman Morgan	4.9	1,288			
Electorate: 34,820 Valid: 26,287 Quota: 6,572 Turnout: 75.5%

=== 1969 general election ===
1969 general election: Clare–South Galway
Party	Candidate	FPv%	Count					
Party	Candidate	FPv%	1	2	3	4	5	6
Fianna Fáil	Bill Loughnane	19.6	5,277	5,292	5,354	5,459	6,076	7,894
Fine Gael	Brigid Hogan-O'Higgins	19.5	5,250	5,332	5,584	7,015		
Fianna Fáil	Michael Carty	19.5	5,245	5,296	5,362	5,519	5,704	8,795
Fianna Fáil	Gerard Millar	18.2	4,886	4,906	5,036	5,086	5,183	
Fine Gael	Patrick Bugler	10.1	2,708	2,718	2,850	3,314		
Fine Gael	Toddie Byrne	8.4	2,254	2,272	2,358			
Labour	Samuel Stanley	2.6	712	1,060				
Labour	Norman Morgan	2.1	561					
Electorate: 35,131 Valid: 26,893 Quota: 6,724 Turnout: 76.5%

== See also ==
- Dáil constituencies
- Politics of the Republic of Ireland
- Historic Dáil constituencies
- Elections in the Republic of Ireland
