= Michael Fahy =

Irish politician (1951–2019)

Galway County Councillor
- In office 1979–2019
- Constituency: Loughrea

Personal details
- Born: 1951
- Died: 2 April 2019 (aged 68)
- Party: Fianna Fáil
- Other political affiliations: Independent

Michael Fahy (1951 – 2 April 2019) was an Irish farmer, and a Fianna Fáil and sometime Independent member of Galway County Council. From Ardrahan and first elected to the council in 1979, he resigned from Fianna Fáil in 2004 when under investigation for misappropriation of funds from the council. He served a prison sentence for this in 2007, but his conviction was overturned in 2011. He rejoined Fianna Fáil in 2018.

== Early career ==
Fahy owned a 70-acre farm and prior to his trial worked as a salesman for New Ireland Assurance. He was appointed a Peace Commissioner in 1978, and was on the visiting committee of Limerick Prison until 2004. He ran in Galway West as an independent in the 1987 general election, but later rejoined Fianna Fáil. In the 2004 local elections, Fahy was criticised for using thousands of prepaid Oireachtas envelopes to write to voters. He said "I wanted to show I had the support of the Oireachtas members and if I hadn't done it like the other candidates, it would seem like I didn't have the same clout." The judge at his 2007 trial alluded to Fahy's "quite extensive property assets of great value"; his 2010 councillor's declaration of interests lists land at Cregclare, Ardrahan, and Caherduff.

== "Stroke" nickname ==
Fahy acquired the nickname "Stroke" (Irish slang for a sly political manoeuvre) in the 1970s from a local journalist after he convinced the Fianna Fáil national executive to add his name to the local election ticket when the local party had left it out. An advertisement in the Galway Advertiser during his 1987 election campaign has the headline The "Stroke" For Galway West. In quashing his 2007 conviction for misappropriation, Justice Finnegan noted "The name by which the applicant is popularly known and which it is likely was known to some at least of a Galway jury could well exacerbate the prejudice having regard to the nature of the offences with which the applicant is charged." After the success of his 2011 appeal, Fahy's solicitor released a statement:

Cllr Fahy is also particularly anxious to have the media refrain from referring to him as 'The Stroke' in the future. He never took offence at the term in the past, because it was used in the context of a different situation. But he never stood before the people as 'The Stroke' Fahy and he would be grateful if the media would henceforth refer to him by his proper name.

== Misappropriation conviction ==
In 2002–03, a road beside Fahy's farm was being widened, using funds allocated from the Community Involvement Scheme. A contractor erected 2,506 metres of fencing on Fahy's farm. Fahy later claimed in court that he had a verbal agreement to supply an equivalent value of rubble from his farm for the roadworks. The contractor was paid by the council in 2002 for an invoice of €7,055, and submitted another invoice in 2003 for €7,523. After a council investigation, Fahy reimbursed the council for €7,055 and apologised for any embarrassment. In March 2004, the Galway county manager asked Fahy to pay €3,000 to charity; he donated that sum to the Ardrahan Lourdes Invalid Fund. An Irish Independent journalist submitted a request for details under freedom of information legislation, and a Garda investigation was begun. When news of this became public in September 2004, Fahy resigned from Fianna Fáil, although local Fianna Fáil TD Joe Callanan and councillor Michael Regan supported him at his trial.

In March 2007 at Galway Circuit Criminal Court in Loughrea a jury took 2½ hours to find him guilty on seven counts:

- Obtaining by false pretences contrary to section 2 of the Larceny Act 1916 as amended by the Larceny Act 1990
- Attempted theft contrary to section 4 of the Criminal Justice (Theft and Fraud Offences) Act 2001 and common law (two counts)
- Attempting to make a gain or cause a loss by deception contrary to section 6 of the Criminal Justice (Theft and Fraud Offences) Act 2001 and common law (two counts)
- False accounting by production or making use of a document contrary to section 10(1)(c) of the Criminal Justice (Theft and Fraud Offences) Act 2001 (two counts)

On 20 March 2007 he was sentenced to one year's imprisonment and fined €75,000. The judge criticised Fahy for attempting to implicate other councillors and the fencing contractor in his actions. Senator Michael Kitt criticised the severity of the sentence. Fahy was given two weeks to get his affairs in order and make provision for his dependent mother. In this time he was taken ill and received hospital treatment for heart problems, further delaying the start of his sentence. He also launched an appeal. He was taken from hospital to prison on 23 April 2007.

Fahy remained a county councillor. The judge had suggested he should be disqualified under subsection 13(1)(m)(i) of the Local Government Act 2001 for "fraudulent or dishonest dealings affecting a local authority"; however section 13(2)(c) delays such disqualification pending appeals. While section 18(4)(a) of the Local Government Act 2001 provides that councillors are deemed to have resigned if they fail to attend meetings for six months, section 18(4)(b)(ii) allows the council to make an exception where the absence was "in good faith for another reason [besides illness]". The council decided not to move against him pending his appeal. On the register of panel electors for the 2007 Seanad election, his address was listed as "c/o Mr. Daniel J. Scannell, Governor, Castlerea Prison, Harristown, Castlerea, Co. Roscommon"; he is believed to be the first person to vote from prison in the Seanad elections. Fahy received the full annual representative pay allowance of €16,600 for the year 2007, although his conference expenses were only €3,700, for conferences attended prior to his imprisonment.

== Quashing of conviction and subsequent career ==
On 28 November 2007, the Court of Criminal Appeal ruled that evidence that Fahy had claimed to have been offered €3.8m for a field was irrelevant and thus inadmissible; and further that it was prejudicial as it did not note that the field had been inherited, and thus allowed the inference that "wealth apparently so disproportionate to his income and station in life was not acquired honestly." The court quashed Fahy's conviction, released him on bail, and ordered a retrial. Senator Terry Leyden was quoted as "delighted" with the decision. At the retrial, two charges were dropped; on 10 December 2008, Fahy was found not guilty on four charges and guilty on one charge of obtaining the use or benefit of €7,055 from Galway County Council by false pretences. He was sentenced to time served of seven months, and fined €30,000. He launched another appeal, and on 31 May 2011 the Court of Criminal Appeal ruled his conviction was unsafe, with Justice Adrian Hardiman saying "the evidence before the court was completely different from the case made by the State". No retrial was ordered.

Fahy's mother Mai, a Cumann na mBan veteran, died aged 99 on 23 December 2008. Fahy was re-elected to Galway county council in the 2009 local elections, topping the poll in the Loughrea local electoral area (LEA). In October 2009, a man was convicted of attempting to extort €5,000 from Fahy by claiming to have tapes of politicians planning to oust or murder Fahy. Fahy was re-elected at the 2014 local elections to Galway county Council. He said afterwards he was considering rejoining Fianna Fáil.

Fahy ran as an independent in Galway East in the 2016 general election, receiving 5.2% of the first-preference vote to finish eighth of the ten candidates. He rejoined Fianna Fáil in 2018, and at the time of his death had been selected to run for the party in Gort/Kinvara LEA in the May 2019 local elections.
