= Robert Malachy Burke =

Irish activist and politician (1907–1998)

Senator
- In office 21 April 1948 – 6 December 1950
- Constituency: Agricultural Panel

Personal details
- Born: 1 March 1907 County Galway, Ireland
- Died: 20 September 1998 (aged 91)
- Party: Labour Party
- Spouse: Ann Grattan

Robert Malachy Burke (1 March 1907 – 20 September 1998) was an Irish Christian socialist, philanthropist and politician. He was born into a landed Church of Ireland family at Ballydugan, Loughrea, County Galway.

He was active (alongside his wife, Ann Grattan of Belfast) in a variety of organisations in the fields of community development, co-operativism, peace activism, religion, and politics. At Toghermore, Tuam (the birthplace of his mother, Ethel Maud Henry), where he came to live following his parents' separation, he established an innovative co-operative farm.

As a Labour Party representative, he sat on Galway County Council, but despite polling strongly in Galway East at a number of elections, he was not elected to the Dáil Éireann.

He was elected to Seanad Éireann in 1948 for the Agricultural Panel, but resigned his seat on 6 December 1950.

Following the death of his mother, Burke gifted his property to the Irish health authorities for use in the struggle against tuberculosis, and, early in 1951, he took up a position as a development worker with an Anglican charity in Nigeria. Alongside his wife, he worked during the next decades with various agencies in Africa, before the couple retired to Belfast. He died in 1998.

== Sources ==
- John Cunningham, 'Bobby Burke: Christian Socialist', in J.A. Claffey (ed.) Glimpses of Tuam since the Famine, Tuam 1997, pp. 239–53.
