= Galway East =

Dáil constituency (1937–1948, 1961–1969, 1977–present)

- Dáil constituency
- Location of Galway East within Ireland
- Interactive map of constituency boundaries since the 2024 general election
- Major settlements: Athenry; Gort; Loughrea; Portumna; Tuam

Current constituency
- Created: 1977
- Seats: 4 (1977–1981); 3 (1981–1997); 4 (1997–2016); 3 (2016–2024); 4 (2024–)
- TDs: Seán Canney (Ind); Albert Dolan (FF); Louis O'Hara (SF); Peter Roche (FG)
- Local government area: County Galway
- Created from: Galway North-East; Clare–South Galway
- EP constituency: Midlands–North-West

Galway East
- Former Dáil constituency

Former constituency
- Created: 1961
- Abolished: 1969
- Seats: 5
- Local government area: County Galway
- Created from: Galway North; Galway South
- Replaced by: Galway North-East; Clare–South Galway

Galway East
- Former Dáil constituency

Former constituency
- Created: 1937
- Abolished: 1948
- Seats: 4
- Local government area: County Galway
- Created from: Galway
- Replaced by: Galway North; Galway South

Galway East is a parliamentary constituency represented in Dáil Éireann, the lower house of the Irish parliament or Oireachtas. The constituency elects four deputies (Teachtaí Dála, commonly known as TDs) on the system of proportional representation by means of the single transferable vote (PR-STV).

== History and boundaries ==
The constituency was first used at the 1937 general election, under the Electoral (Revision of Constituencies) Act 1935, when the former Galway constituency was split into Galway East and Galway West. It was abolished in 1948 and recreated in 1961. It was abolished again in 1969 and recreated in 1977.

It spans much of the eastern half of County Galway, taking in the towns of Ballinasloe, Tuam, Portumna, Athenry and Loughrea among other areas.

The Constituency Review Report 2023 of the Electoral Commission recommended that at the next general election, Galway East be increased to a four-seat constituency with the transfer of territory from Roscommon–Galway.

The Electoral (Amendment) Act 2023 defines the constituency as:

"In the county of Galway, the electoral divisions of:

Abbeygormacan, Aughrim, Ballymacward, Clonfert, Clontuskert, Kilconnell, Killaan, Killallaghtan, Killoran, Kilmacshane, Kiltormer, Laurencetown, Oatfield in the former Rural District of Ballinasloe;
Aughrim, Belleville, Deerpark, Stradbally in the former Rural District of Galway;
Ardamullivan, Ardrahan, Ballycahalan, Beagh, Cahermore, Cappard, Castletaylor, Doorus, Drumacoo, Gort, Kilbeacanty, Killeely, Killeenavarra, Killinny, Kiltartan, Kilthomas, Kinvarra, Rahasane, Skehanagh, in the former Rural District of Gort;
Ballinastack, Boyounagh, Curraghmore, Glennamaddy, Kiltullagh, Raheen, Scregg, Shankill, Templetogher in the former Rural District of Glennamaddy;
Aille, Athenry, Ballynagar, Bracklagh, Bullaun, Cappalusk, Castleboy, Cloonkeen, Colmanstown, Craughwell, Derrylaur, Drumkeary, Graigabbey, Grange, Greethill, Kilchreest, Kilconickny, Kilconierin, Killimor, Killogilleen, Kilmeen, Kilreekill, Kilteskill, Kiltullagh, Lackalea, Leitrim, Loughatorick, Loughrea Rural, Loughrea Urban, Marblehill, Mountain, Moyode, Raford, Tiaquin, Woodford, in the former Rural District of Loughrea;
Annagh, Ballynakill, Caltra, Castleblakeney, Clonbrock, Cloonkeen, Cooloo, Derryglassaun, Killian, Mount Bellew, Mounthazel in the former Rural District of Mount Bellew;
Abbeyville, Ballyglass, Coos, Derrew, Drummin, Eyrecourt, Killimor, Kilmalinoge, Kilquain, Meelick, Moat, Pallas, Portumna, Tiranascragh, Tynagh, in the former Rural District of Portumna;
Abbey East, Abbey West, Addergoole, Annaghdown, Ballinderry, Ballinduff, Ballynapark, Beaghmore, Belclare, Carrownagur, Carrowrevagh, Claretuam, Clonbern, Cloonkeen, Cummer, Donaghpatrick, Doonbally, Dunmore North, Dunmore South, Foxhall, Headford, Hillsbrook, Kilbennan, Kilcoona, Killeany, Killeen, Killererin, Killower, Killursa, Kilmoylan, Kilshanvy, Levally, Milltown, Monivea, Moyne, Ryehill, Toberadosh, Tuam Rural, Tuam Urban, in the former Rural District of Tuam."

Changes to the Galway East constituency
Years	TDs	Boundaries	Notes
1937–1948	4	County Galway, except the parts in the constituencies of Clare and Galway West	Created from Galway
1948–1961	—	Constituency abolished	
1961–1969	5	County Galway, except the parts in the constituency of Galway West	
1969–1977	—	Constituency abolished	
1977–1981	4	County Galway, except the parts in the constituency of Galway West	
1981–1992	3	In County Galway, the urban district of Ballinasloe and the district electoral divisions of Abbeygormacan, Ahascragh, Aughrim, Ballinasloe Rural, Ballymacward, Clonfert, Clontuskert, Kellysgrove, Kilconnell, Killaan, Killallaghtan, Killoran, Killure, Kilmacshane, Kiltormer, Kylemore, Laurencetown, Lismanny, Oatfield, in the former Rural District of Ballinasloe No. 1; Curraghmore, Glennamaddy, Kiltullagh, Raheen, Scregg, Shankill, in the former Rural District of Glennamaddy; Aille, Ballynagar, Bracklagh, Bullaun, Cappalusk, Cloonkeen, Colmanstown, Derrylaur, Drumkeary, Graigabbey, Grange, Killimor, Kilmeen, Kilreekill, Kilteskill, Lackalea, Leitrim, Loughatorick, Loughrea Rural, Loughrea Urban, Marblehill, Mountain, Raford, Tiaquin, Woodford, in the former Rural District of Loughrea; Annagh, Ballynakill, Caltra, Castleblakeney, Castleffrench, Clonbrock, Cloonkeen, Cooloo, Derryglassaun, Killeroran, Killian, Mount Bellew, Mounthazel, Taghboy, in the former Rural District of Mount Bellew; Abbeyville, Ballyglass, Coos, Derrew, Drummin, Eyrecourt, Killimor, Kilmalinoge, Kilquain, Meelick, Moat, Pallas, Portumna, Tieranascragh, Tynagh, in the former Rural District of Portumna; Abbey East, Abbey West, Addergoole, Ballynapark, Belclare, Carrownagur, Carrowrevagh, Clonbern, Cloonkeen, Doonbally, Dunmore North, Dunmore South, Foxhall, Hillsbrook, Kilbennan, Killeen, Killererin, Kilshanvy, Levally, Milltown, Monivea, Moyne, Ryehill, Toberadosh, Tuam Rural, Tuam Urban, in the former Rural District of Tuam.	
1992–1997	3	In County Galway, the urban district of Ballinasloe and the district electoral divisions of Abbeygormacan, Ahascragh, Aughrim, Ballinasloe Rural, Ballymacward, Clonfert, Clontuskert, Kellysgrove, Kilconnell, Killaan, Killallaghtan, Killoran, Killure, Kilmacshane, Kiltormer, Kylemore, Laurencetown, Lismanny, Oatfield, in the former Rural District of Ballinasloe No. 1; Ballinastack, Ballymoe, Ballynakill, Boyounagh, Creggs, Curraghmore, Glennamaddy, Island, Kilcroan, Kiltullagh, Raheen, Scregg, Shankill, Templetogher, Toberroe, in the former Rural District of Glennamaddy; Aille, Ballynagar, Bracklagh, Bullaun, Cappalusk, Cloonkeen, Colmanstown, Derrylaur, Drumkeary, Graigabbey Grange, Killimor, Kilmeen, Kilreekill, Kilteskill, Lackalea, Leitrim, Loughatorick, Loughrea Rural, Loughrea Urban, Marblehill, Mountain, Raford, Tiaquin, Woodford, in the former Rural District of Loughrea; Annagh, Ballynakill, Caltra, Castleblakeney, Castleffrench, Clonbrock, Cloonkeen, Cooloo, Derryglassaun, Killeroran, Killian, Mount Bellew, Mounthazel, Taghboy, in the former Rural District of Mount Bellew; Abbeyville, Ballyglass, Coos, Derrew, Drummin, Eyrecourt, Killimor, Kilmalinoge, Kilquain, Meelick, Moat, Pallas, Portumna, Tiranascragh, Tynagh, in the former Rural District of Portumna; Abbey East, Abbey West, Ballynapark, Carrownagur, Carrowrevagh, Clonbern, Cloonkeen, Dunmore North, Dunmore South, Hillsbrook, Killererin, Levally, Monivea, Moyne, Ryehill, Toberadosh, Tuam Rural, Tuam Urban, in the former Rural District of Tuam.	Transfer to Mayo East of Addergoole, Belclare, Doonbally, Foxhall, Kilbennan, Killeen, Kilshanvy, Milltown, in the former Rural District of Tuam and transfer from Roscommon of Ballinastack, Ballymoe, Ballynakill, Boyounagh, Creggs, Island, Kilcroan, Templetogher, Toberroe, in the former Rural District of Glennamaddy.
1997–2002	4	In County Galway, the urban district of Ballinasloe and the district electoral divisions of Abbeygormacan, Ahascragh, Aughrim, Ballinasloe Rural, Ballymacward, Clonfert, Clontuskert, Kellysgrove, Kilconnell, Killaan, Killallaghtan, Killoran, Killure, Kilmacshane, Kiltormer, Kylemore, Laurencetown, Lismanny, Oatfield, in the former Rural District of Ballinasloe No. 1; Ballinastack, Ballymoe, Ballynakill, Boyounagh, Creggs, Curraghmore, Glennamaddy, Island, Kilcroan, Kiltullagh, Raheen, Scregg, Shankill, Templetogher, Toberroe, in the former Rural District of Glennamaddy; Ardamullivan, Ardrahan, Ballycahalan, Beagh, Cahermore, Cappard, Castletaylor, Doorus, Drumacoo, Gort, Kilbeacanty, Killeely, Killeenavarra, Killinny, Kiltartan, Kilthomas, Kinvarra, Rahasane, Skehanagh, in the former Rural District of Gort; Aille, Athenry, Ballynagar, Bracklagh, Bullaun, Castleboy, Cappalusk, Cloonkeen, Colmanstown, Craughwell, Derrylaur, Drumkeary, Graigabbey, Grange, Greethill, Kilchreest, Kilconickny, Kilconierin, Killimor, Killogilleen, Kilmeen, Kilreekill, Kilteskill, Kiltullagh, Lackalea, Leitrim, Loughatorick, Loughrea Rural, Loughrea Urban, Marblehill, Mountain, Movode, Raford, Tiaquin, Woodford, in the former Rural District of Loughrea; Annagh, Ballynakill, Caltra, Castleblakeney, Castleffrench, Clonbrock, Cloonkeen, Cooloo, Derryglassaun, Killeroran, Killian, Mount Bellew, Mounthazel, Taghboy, in the former Rural District of Mount Bellew; Abbeyville, Ballyglass, Coos, Derrew, Drummin, Eyrecourt, Killimor, Kilmalinoge, Kilquain, Meelick, Moat, Pallas, Portumna, Tiranascragh, Tynagh, in the former Rural District of Portumna; Abbey East, Abbey West, Addergoole, Belclare, Ballinderry, Ballynapark, Claretuam, Clonbern, Cloonkeen, Carrownagur, Carrowrevagh, Cummer, Doonbally, Dunmore North, Dunmore South, Foxhall, Hillsbrook, Kilbennan, Killeen, Killererin, Kilmoylan, Kilshanvy, Levally, Milltown, Monivea, Moyne, Ryehill, Toberadosh, Tuam Rural and Tuam Urban, in the former Rural District of Tuam.	Transfer from Mayo East of Addergoole, Belclare, Doonbally, Foxhall, Kilbennan, Killeen, Kilshanvy, Milltown, in the former Rural District of Tuam; and transfer from Galway West of areas in the former rural districts of Gort, Loughrea and Tuam.
2002–2016	4	In County Galway, the urban district of Ballinasloe and the district electoral divisions of Abbeygormacan, Ahascragh, Aughnim, Ballinasloe Rural, Ballymacward, Clonfert, Clontuskert, Kellysgrove, Kilconnell, Killaan, Killallaghtan, Killoran, Killure, Kilmacshane, Kiltormer, Kylemore, Laurencetown, Lismanny, Oatfield, in the former Rural District of Ballinasloe No. 1; Ballinastack, Ballymoe, Ballynakill, Boyounagh, Creggs, Curraghmore, Glennamaddy, Island, Kilcroan, Kiltullagh, Raheen, Scregg, Shankill, Templetogher, Toberroe, in the former Rural District of Glennamaddy; Ardamullivan, Ardrahan, Ballycahalan, Beagh, Cahermore, Cappard, Castletaylor, Doorus, Drumacoo, Gort, Kilbeacanty, Killeely, Killeenavarra, Killinny, Kiltartan, Kilthomas, Kinvarra, Rahasane, Skehanagh, in the former Rural District of Gort; Aille, Athenry, Ballynagar, Bracklagh, Bullaun, Castleboy, Cappalusk, Cloonkeen, Colmanstown, Craughwell, Derrylaur, Drumkeary, Graigabbey, Grange, Greethill, Kilchreest, Kilconickny, Kilconierin, Killimor, Killogilleen, Kilmeen, Kilreekill, Kilteskill, Kiltullagh, Lackalea, Leitrim, Loughatorick, Loughrea Rural, Loughrea Urban, Marblehill, Mountain, Movode, Raford, Tiaquin, Woodford, in the former Rural District of Loughrea; Annagh, Ballynakill, Caltra, Castleblakeney, Castleffrench, Clonbrock, Cloonkeen, Cooloo, Derryglassaun, Killeroran, Killian, Mount Bellew, Mounthazel, Taghboy, in the former Rural District of Mount Bellew; Abbeyville, Ballyglass, Coos, Derrew, Drummin, Eyrecourt, Killimor, Kilmalinoge, Kilquain, Meelick, Moat, Pallas, Portumna, Tiranascragh, Tynagh, in the former Rural District of Portumna; Abbey East, Abbey West, Addergoole, Annaghdown, Ballinderry, Ballinduff, Ballynapark, Beaghmore, Belclare, Carrownagur, Carrowrevagh, Claretuam, Clonbern, Cloonkeen, Cummer, Donaghpatrick, Doonbally, Dunmore North, Dunmore South, Foxhall, Headford, Hillsbrook, Kilbennan, Kilcoona, Killeany, Killeen, Killererin, Killower, Killursa, Kilmoylan, Kilshanvy, Levally, Milltown, Monivea, Moyne, Ryehill, Toberadosh, Tuam Rural, Tuam Urban, in the former Rural District of Tuam.	Transfer from Galway West of territory in the former Rural District of Tuam.
2016–2020	3	In County Galway, the electoral divisions of Abbeygormacan, Aughrim, Ballymacward, Clonfert, Kilconnell, Killaan, Killallaghtan, Killoran, Kilmacshane, Kiltormer, Laurencetown, Oatfield, in the former Rural District of Ballinasloe No. 1; Scregg, in the former Rural District of Glennamaddy; Ardamullivan, Ardrahan, Ballycahalan, Beagh, Cahermore, Cappard, Castletaylor, Doorus, Drumacoo, Gort, Kilbeacanty, Killeely, Killeenavarra, Killinny, Kiltartan, Kilthomas, Kinvarra, Rahasane, Skehanagh, in the former Rural District of Gort; Aille, Athenry, Ballynagar, Bracklagh, Bullaun, Cappalusk, Castleboy, Cloonkeen, Colmanstown, Craughwell, Derrylaur, Drumkeary, Graigabbey, Grange, Greethill, Kilchreest, Kilconickny, Kilconierin, Killimor, Killogilleen, Kilmeen, Kilreekill, Kilteskill, Kiltullagh, Lackalea, Leitrim, Loughatorick, Loughrea Rural, Loughrea Urban, Marblehill, Mountain, Movode, Raford, Tiaquin, Woodford, in the former Rural District of Loughrea; Annagh, Cooloo, Derryglassaun, Mount Bellew, Mounthazel, in the former Rural District of Mount Bellew; Abbeyville, Ballyglass, Coos, Derrew, Drummin, Eyrecourt, Killimor, Kilmalinoge, Kilquain, Meelick, Moat, Pallas, Portumna, Tiranascragh, Tynagh, in the former Rural District of Portumna; Abbey East, Abbey West, Addergoole, Annaghdown, Ballinderry, Ballinduff, Ballynapark, Beaghmore, Belclare, Carrownagur, Carrowrevagh, Claretuam, Clonbern, Cloonkeen, Cummer, Donaghpatrick, Doonbally, Dunmore South, Foxhall, Headford, Hillsbrook, Kilbennan, Kilcoona, Killeany, Killeen, Killererin, Killower, Killursa, Kilmoylan, Kilshanvy, Levally, Milltown, Monivea, Moyne, Ryehill, Tuam Rural, Tuam Urban, in the former Rural District of Tuam.	Transfer to Roscommon–Galway of Ballinasloe Urban; Ahascragh, Ballinasloe Rural, Clontuskert, Kellysgrove, Killure, Kylemore, Lismanny, in the former Rural District of Ballinasloe No. 1; Ballinastack, Ballymoe, Ballynakill, Boyounagh, Creggs, Curraghmore, Glennamaddy, Island, Kilcroan, Kiltullagh, Raheen, Shankill, Templetogher, Toberroe, in the former Rural District of Glennamaddy; Ballynakill, Caltra, Castleblakeney, Castleffrench, Clonbrock, Cloonkeen, Killeroran, Killian, Taghboy, in the former Rural District of Mount Bellew; Dunmore North, Toberadosh, in the former Rural District of Tuam.
2020–	3	In County Galway, the electoral divisions of Abbeygormacan, Clonfert, Killoran, Kilmacshane, Kiltormer, Laurencetown, in the former Rural District of Ballinasloe No. 1; Aughrim, Belleville, Deerpark, Stradbally, in the former Rural District of Galway; Ardamullivan, Ardrahan, Ballycahalan, Beagh, Cahermore, Cappard, Castletaylor, Doorus, Drumacoo, Gort, Kilbeacanty, Killeely, Killeenavarra, Killinny, Kiltartan, Kilthomas, Kinvarra, Rahasane, Skehanagh, in the former Rural District of Gort; Aille, Athenry, Ballynagar, Bracklagh, Bullaun, Cappalusk, Castleboy, Cloonkeen, Colmanstown, Craughwell, Derrylaur, Drumkeary, Graigabbey, Grange, Greethill, Kilchreest, Kilconickny, Kilconierin, Killimor, Killogilleen, Kilmeen, Kilreekill, Kilteskill, Kiltullagh, Lackalea, Leitrim, Loughatorick, Loughrea Rural, Loughrea Urban, Marblehill, Mountain, Movode, Raford, Tiaquin, Woodford, in the former Rural District of Loughrea; Cooloo, Derryglassaun, in the former Rural District of Mount Bellew; Abbeyville, Ballyglass, Coos, Derrew, Drummin, Eyrecourt, Killimor, Kilmalinoge, Kilquain, Meelick, Moat, Pallas, Portumna, Tiranascragh, Tynagh, in the former Rural District of Portumna; Abbey East, Abbey West, Annaghdown, Ballinderry, Ballinduff, Ballynapark, Beaghmore, Belclare, Carrowrevagh, Claretuam, Cummer, Donaghpatrick, Doonbally, Foxhall, Headford, Hillsbrook, Kilbennan, Kilcoona, Killeany, Killeen, Killererin, Killower, Killursa, Kilmoylan, Kilshanvy, Levally, Milltown, Monivea, Moyne, Ryehill, Tuam Rural, Tuam Urban, in the former Rural District of Tuam.	Transfer from Galway West of Aughrim, Belleville, Deerpark, Stradbally, in the former Rural District of Galway and transfer to Roscommon–Galway of Aughrim, Ballymacward, Kilconnell, Killaan, Killallaghtan, Oatfield, in the former Rural District of Ballinasloe No. 1; Scregg, in the former Rural District of Glennamaddy; Annagh, Mount Bellew, Mounthazel, in the former Rural District of Mount Bellew;; Addergoole, Carrownagur, Clonbern, Cloonkeen, Dunmore South, in the former Rural District of Tuam.

== TDs ==
=== TDs 1937–1948 ===
Teachtaí Dála (TDs) for Galway East 1937–1948
Key to parties: CC = CC; CnaT = Clann na Talmhan; FF = Fianna Fáil; FG = Fine Gael
Dáil	Election	Deputy (Party)	Deputy (Party)	Deputy (Party)	Deputy (Party)
9th	1937	Frank Fahy (Note: As Ceann Comhairle, Frank Fahy was returned automatically in each of the four elections held in Galway East from 1937 to 1944 and did not form part of the Fianna Fáil parliamentary party.) (FF)	Mark Killilea Snr (FF)	Patrick Beegan (FF)	Seán Broderick (FG)
10th	1938	Frank Fahy (FF)	Mark Killilea Snr (FF)	Patrick Beegan (FF)	Seán Broderick (FG)
11th	1943	Frank Fahy (FF)	Mark Killilea Snr (FF)	Patrick Beegan (FF)	Michael Donnellan (CnaT)
12th	1944	Frank Fahy (FF)	Mark Killilea Snr (FF)	Patrick Beegan (FF)	Michael Donnellan (CnaT)
13th	1948	Constituency abolished. See Galway North and Galway South			

Note: The columns in this table are used only for presentational purposes, and no significance should be attached to the order of columns. For details of the order in which seats were won at each election, see the detailed results of that election.

=== TDs 1961–1969 ===
Teachtaí Dála (TDs) for Galway East 1961–1969
Key to parties: CnaT = Clann na Talmhan; FF = Fianna Fáil; FG = Fine Gael
Dáil	Election	Deputy (Party)	Deputy (Party)	Deputy (Party)	Deputy (Party)	Deputy (Party)
17th	1961	Michael F. Kitt (FF)	Anthony Millar (FF)	Michael Carty (FF)	Michael Donnellan (CnaT)	Brigid Hogan-O'Higgins (FG)
17th	1964 by-election	Michael F. Kitt (FF)	Anthony Millar (FF)	Michael Carty (FF)	John Donnellan (FG)	Brigid Hogan-O'Higgins (FG)
18th	1965	Michael F. Kitt (FF)	Anthony Millar (FF)	Michael Carty (FF)	John Donnellan (FG)	Brigid Hogan-O'Higgins (FG)
19th	1969	Constituency abolished. See Galway North-East and Clare–South Galway				

Note: The columns in this table are used only for presentational purposes, and no significance should be attached to the order of columns. For details of the order in which seats were won at each election, see the detailed results of that election.

=== TDs since 1977 ===
Teachtaí Dála (TDs) for Galway East 1977–
Key to parties: FF = Fianna Fáil; FG = Fine Gael; Lab = Labour; SF = Sinn Féin; Ind. = Independent
Dáil	Election	Deputy (Party)	Deputy (Party)	Deputy (Party)	Deputy (Party)
21st	1977	Johnny Callanan (FF)	Thomas Hussey (FF)	Mark Killilea Jnr (FF)	John Donnellan (FG)
22nd	1981	Johnny Callanan (FF)	Michael P. Kitt (FF)	Paul Connaughton Snr (FG)	3 seats 1981–1997
23rd	1982 (Feb)	Johnny Callanan (FF)	Michael P. Kitt (FF)	Paul Connaughton Snr (FG)	3 seats 1981–1997
23rd	1982 by-election	Noel Treacy (FF)	Michael P. Kitt (FF)	Paul Connaughton Snr (FG)	3 seats 1981–1997
24th	1982 (Nov)	Noel Treacy (FF)	Michael P. Kitt (FF)	Paul Connaughton Snr (FG)	3 seats 1981–1997
25th	1987	Noel Treacy (FF)	Michael P. Kitt (FF)	Paul Connaughton Snr (FG)	3 seats 1981–1997
26th	1989	Noel Treacy (FF)	Michael P. Kitt (FF)	Paul Connaughton Snr (FG)	3 seats 1981–1997
27th	1992	Noel Treacy (FF)	Michael P. Kitt (FF)	Paul Connaughton Snr (FG)	3 seats 1981–1997
28th	1997	Noel Treacy (FF)	Michael P. Kitt (FF)	Paul Connaughton Snr (FG)	Ulick Burke (FG)
29th	2002	Noel Treacy (FF)	Joe Callanan (FF)	Paul Connaughton Snr (FG)	Paddy McHugh (Ind.)
30th	2007	Noel Treacy (FF)	Michael P. Kitt (FF)	Paul Connaughton Snr (FG)	Ulick Burke (FG)
31st	2011	Colm Keaveney (Lab)	Michael P. Kitt (FF)	Ciarán Cannon (FG)	Paul Connaughton Jnr (FG)
32nd	2016	Seán Canney (Ind.)	Anne Rabbitte (FF)	Ciarán Cannon (FG)	3 seats 2016–2024
33rd	2020	Seán Canney (Ind.)	Anne Rabbitte (FF)	Ciarán Cannon (FG)	3 seats 2016–2024
34th	2024	Seán Canney (Ind.)	Albert Dolan (FF)	Peter Roche (FG)	Louis O'Hara (SF)

Note: The columns in this table are used only for presentational purposes, and no significance should be attached to the order of columns. For details of the order in which seats were won at each election, see the detailed results of that election.

== Elections ==
*: Outgoing TD

=== 2024 general election ===
2024 general election: Galway East
Party	Candidate	FPv%	Count										
Party	Candidate	FPv%	1	2	3	4	5	6	7	8	9	10	11
Fianna Fáil	Albert Dolan	18.7	10,140	10,162	10,235	10,286	10,510	10,671	10,712	11,249			
Independent	Seán Canney	18.5	10,030	10,076	10,323	10,502	10,695	11,204					
Sinn Féin	Louis O'Hara	13.8	7,459	7,502	7,635	8,190	8,608	8,887	8,914	9,037	9,080	9,502	10,078
Fine Gael	Peter Roche	10.2	5,521	5,533	5,551	5,573	5,676	5,786	5,828	6,367	6,447	7,534	11,557
Independent Ireland	Declan Geraghty	9.5	5,150	5,158	5,423	5,487	5,522	6,067	6,292	6,446	6,477	7,123	7,581
Fianna Fáil	Anne Rabbitte	7.5	4,056	4,063	4,101	4,118	4,266	4,313	4,324	4,769	4,886		
Fine Gael	Clodagh Higgins	6.4	3,458	3,477	3,510	3,545	3,792	3,832	3,843	4,965	5,100	6,591	
Fine Gael	Niamh Madden	5.1	2,765	2,777	2,843	2,857	2,980	3,011	3,015				
Aontú	Luke Silke	2.9	1,554	1,557	1,770	1,818	1,865						
Green	Eoin Madden	2.3	1,263	1,356	1,374	1,687							
PBP–Solidarity	Conor Burke (Note: Burke is a member of Solidarity.)	2.3	1,238	1,312	1,373								
The Irish People	David O'Reilly	1.1	610	620									
Independent	Paul Madden	1.1	585	612									
Independent	Fergal Landy	0.7	385										
Electorate: 87,791 Valid: 54,214 Spoilt: 362 Quota: 10,843 Turnout: 62.2%

=== 2020 general election ===
2020 general election: Galway East
Party	Candidate	FPv%	Count							
Party	Candidate	FPv%	1	2	3	4	5	6	7	8
Independent	Seán Canney	18.4	7,815	7,894	8,142	8,331	8,785	9,896	12,292	
Sinn Féin	Louis O'Hara	16.7	7,108	7,177	7,294	7,649	8,441	8,799	9,411	9,685
Fine Gael	Ciarán Cannon	14.8	6,298	6,307	6,326	6,536	7,114	7,425	9,990	10,890
Fine Gael	Peter Roche	14.2	6,034	6,040	6,090	6,180	6,392	6,973		
Fianna Fáil	Anne Rabbitte	13.5	5,762	5,776	5,820	5,943	6,121	8,676	9,535	10,022
Fianna Fáil	Donagh Killilea	11.6	4,932	4,946	5,004	5,066	5,171			
Green	Eoin Madden	4.5	1,924	1,942	1,977	2,647				
Social Democrats	Peter Reid	2.0	848	867	892					
Labour	Marian Spelman	2.0	845	863	890					
Aontú	Martin Ward	1.4	582	670						
Independent	David O'Reilly	0.6	246							
Renua	Deaglán Mac Canna	0.3	126							
Electorate: 69,233 Valid: 42,520 Spoilt: 338 (0.8%) Quota: 10,631 Turnout: 42,858 (61.9%)

=== 2016 general election ===
2016 general election: Galway East
Party	Candidate	FPv%	Count						
Party	Candidate	FPv%	1	2	3	4	5	6	7
Independent	Seán Canney	18.7	8,447	8,713	9,072	10,196	10,969	12,707	
Fine Gael	Ciarán Cannon	15.7	7,123	7,220	7,650	7,812	9,519	9,920	10,157
Fianna Fáil	Anne Rabbitte	15.3	6,928	6,995	7,566	7,966	8,791	12,255	
Fine Gael	Paul Connaughton Jnr	14.3	6,474	6,536	6,689	6,812	7,866	8,361	8,853
Fianna Fáil	Colm Keaveney	12.0	5,436	5,511	5,823	6,127	6,700		
Labour	Lorraine Higgins	10.0	4,531	4,792	5,080	5,470			
Sinn Féin	Anne Marie Roche	5.9	2,683	2,968	3,159				
Independent	Michael Fahy	5.2	2,358	2,418					
Green	Mairead Ní Chroinin	1.7	769						
Direct Democracy	Aengus Melia	1.1	489						
Electorate: 68,432 Valid: 45,238 Spoilt: 379 (0.8%) Quota: 11,310 Turnout: 45,617 (66.7%)

=== 2011 general election ===
2011 general election: Galway East
Party	Candidate	FPv%	Count								
Party	Candidate	FPv%	1	2	3	4	5	6	7	8	9
Fine Gael	Paul Connaughton Jnr	12.2	7,255	7,310	7,552	7,802	8,091	9,824	10,877	12,610	
Fine Gael	Ciarán Cannon	11.7	6,927	7,061	7,268	7,565	8,125	9,962	10,279	11,861	
Fianna Fáil	Michael P. Kitt	11.1	6,585	6,632	6,860	9,526	9,793	10,223	11,115	12,850	
Fine Gael	Tom McHugh	9.8	5,832	5,868	5,950	6,034	6,125	6,736	8,371	8,665	8,848
Independent	Seán Canney	9.4	5,567	5,645	5,940	6,127	6,341	6,431			
Fine Gael	Jimmy McClearn	9.1	5,395	5,440	5,634	5,778	5,987				
Independent	Tim Broderick	8.7	5,137	5,242	6,278	6,516	6,846	7,641	8,365		
Labour	Colm Keaveney	7.2	4,254	4,344	4,693	4,785	7,236	7,469	8,636	9,806	10,126
Fianna Fáil	Michael F. Dolan	6.9	4,109	4,155	4,290						
Sinn Féin	Dermot Connolly	6.1	3,635	3,723							
Labour	Lorraine Higgins	6.0	3,577	3,813	4,423	4,651					
Independent	Emer O'Donnell	1.0	601								
Green	Ciarán Kennedy	0.7	402								
Electorate: 83,651 Valid: 59,276 Spoilt: 560 (0.9%) Quota: 11,856 Turnout: 59,836 (71.5%)

=== 2007 general election ===
2007 general election: Galway East
Party	Candidate	FPv%	Count								
Party	Candidate	FPv%	1	2	3	4	5	6	7	8	9
Fianna Fáil	Michael P. Kitt	15.8	8,796	8,911	9,121	9,327	9,720	10,637	11,077	12,225	
Fianna Fáil	Noel Treacy	13.5	7,524	7,668	7,817	7,943	8,895	9,399	9,805	10,316	10,591
Fine Gael	Paul Connaughton Snr	12.3	6,886	6,989	7,113	7,398	7,698	8,315	9,927	13,058	
Fianna Fáil	Joe Callanan	10.4	5,817	5,922	6,135	6,184	6,802	6,950	7,709	7,850	7,932
Fine Gael	Ulick Burke	9.2	5,149	5,318	5,443	5,645	6,194	6,316	8,612	9,641	11,183
Fine Gael	John Barton	8.8	4,916	5,079	5,435	5,663	6,050	6,218			
Fine Gael	Tom McHugh	8.8	4,881	4,958	5,019	5,529	5,584	6,710	6,936		
Progressive Democrats	Ciarán Cannon	6.0	3,321	3,447	3,507	3,599					
Independent	Paddy McHugh	5.8	3,224	3,382	3,602	4,051	4,212				
Sinn Féin	Jason Devlin	3.2	1,789	1,953							
Labour	Colm Keaveney	3.1	1,747	2,120	2,371						
Green	Maíread Ní Chroínín	1.9	1,057								
Independent	Adrian Feeney	0.7	397								
Independent	Clare Flynn	0.5	290								
Electorate: 81,684 Valid: 55,794 Spoilt: 480 (0.8%) Quota: 11,159 Turnout: 56,274 (68.9%)

=== 2002 general election ===
2002 general election: Galway East
Party	Candidate	FPv%	Count				
Party	Candidate	FPv%	1	2	3	4	5
Fine Gael	Paul Connaughton Snr	17.5	8,635	8,766	8,984	13,971	
Fianna Fáil	Joe Callanan	15.9	7,898	7,963	8,315	9,414	10,366
Independent	Paddy McHugh	15.8	7,786	8,042	8,581	8,825	9,881
Fianna Fáil	Noel Treacy	15.7	7,765	7,847	8,091	8,726	9,253
Fianna Fáil	Michael P. Kitt	15.1	7,454	7,513	7,711	7,950	8,243
Fine Gael	Ulick Burke	14.0	6,941	7,152	7,445		
Sinn Féin	Daithí Mac an Bháird	3.7	1,828	2,068			
Green	Úna Ní Bhroin	2.1	1,022				
Christian Solidarity	Manus Mac Meanamáin	0.2	93				
Electorate: 73,659 Valid: 49,422 Spoilt: 452 (0.9%) Quota: 9,885 Turnout: 49,874 (67.7%)

=== 1997 general election ===
1997 general election: Galway East
Party	Candidate	FPv%	Count				
Party	Candidate	FPv%	1	2	3	4	5
Fine Gael	Ulick Burke	16.2	6,931	7,436	7,491	7,744	8,570
Fianna Fáil	Noel Treacy	15.2	6,531	6,854	7,149	7,524	7,970
Fine Gael	Paul Connaughton Snr	15.0	6,445	6,620	6,809	7,330	8,826
Fianna Fáil	Joe Callanan	14.5	6,221	6,603	6,929	7,421	7,632
Fianna Fáil	Michael P. Kitt	12.7	5,436	5,634	6,762	7,523	8,455
Labour	Colm Keaveney	7.9	3,400	3,604	3,908	4,949	
Progressive Democrats	Joe Burke	7.4	3,182	3,303	3,655		
Fianna Fáil	Patrick J. Finnegan	6.2	2,670	2,710			
Independent	Pat Hynes	3.0	1,298				
Independent	Sheila Mary Ganly	1.6	705				
Natural Law	Paul Campbell	0.2	98				
Electorate: 61,075 Valid: 42,917 Spoilt: 451 (1.0%) Quota: 8,584 Turnout: 43,368 (71.0%)

=== 1992 general election ===
1992 general election: Galway East
Party	Candidate	FPv%	Count					
Party	Candidate	FPv%	1	2	3	4	5	6
Fine Gael	Paul Connaughton Snr	21.8	6,339	6,358	6,714	6,894	9,064	
Fianna Fáil	Michael P. Kitt	20.9	6,062	6,122	6,324	7,571		
Fianna Fáil	Noel Treacy	20.1	5,834	5,882	6,175	6,544	6,931	7,224
Progressive Democrats	Joe Burke	13.4	3,882	3,911	4,299	4,640	5,054	6,087
Fine Gael	Michael Mullins	9.9	2,864	2,903	3,121	3,157		
Fianna Fáil	Patrick J. Finnegan	7.6	2,198	2,220	2,259			
Labour	Pat Hynes	5.5	1,586	1,641				
Sinn Féin	Dermot Connolly	1.1	306					
Electorate: 42,672 Valid: 29,071 Spoilt: 463 (1.6%) Quota: 7,268 Turnout: 29,534 (69.2%)

=== 1989 general election ===
1989 general election: Galway East
Party	Candidate	FPv%	Count			
Party	Candidate	FPv%	1	2	3	4
Fine Gael	Paul Connaughton Snr	29.5	8,593			
Fianna Fáil	Michael P. Kitt	26.0	7,573			
Fianna Fáil	Noel Treacy	24.1	7,030	7,128	7,277	7,473
Fine Gael	Michael Finnerty	9.6	2,800	2,912	3,941	3,960
Fianna Fáil	Patrick Finnegan	9.3	2,721	2,779	2,911	2,986
Independent	Pádraig Ó Ceallaigh	1.4	412			
Electorate: 42,016 Valid: 29,129 Quota: 7,283 Turnout: 69.3%

=== 1987 general election ===
1987 general election: Galway East
Party	Candidate	FPv%	Count				
Party	Candidate	FPv%	1	2	3	4	5
Fianna Fáil	Michael P. Kitt	20.7	6,831	9,098			
Fianna Fáil	Noel Treacy	20.5	6,762	7,347	7,656	7,790	8,605
Fine Gael	Paul Connaughton Snr	20.4	6,719	6,951	9,558		
Progressive Democrats	Joe Burke	16.6	5,463	5,734	6,485	7,674	7,722
Fine Gael	Ulick Burke	11.2	3,700	3,762			
Fianna Fáil	Thomas Hussey	10.5	3,463				
Electorate: 42,587 Valid: 32,938 Quota: 8,235 Turnout: 77.3%

=== November 1982 general election ===
November 1982 general election: Galway East
Party	Candidate	FPv%	Count					
Party	Candidate	FPv%	1	2	3	4	5	6
Fine Gael	Paul Connaughton Snr	20.0	6,563	6,579	6,719	8,200	8,648	
Fianna Fáil	Michael P. Kitt	18.9	6,208	6,229	6,318	6,517	9,844	
Fianna Fáil	Noel Treacy	17.6	5,785	5,801	5,829	5,888	7,034	8,621
Fine Gael	Ulick Burke	15.9	5,220	5,257	5,438	6,720	6,873	6,926
Fianna Fáil	Thomas Hussey	15.0	4,909	4,926	5,066	5,320		
Fine Gael	Joe Burke	9.3	3,040	3,050	3,384			
Labour	Kevin Dwyer	2.8	926	965				
Independent	Brian Parker	0.5	164					
Electorate: 42,226 Valid: 32,815 Quota: 8,204 Turnout: 77.7%

=== July 1982 by-election ===
Fianna Fáil TD Johnny Callanan died on 15 June 1982. The by-election was held on 20 July 1982, and was won by Fianna Fáil candidate Noel Treacy.

1982 by-election: Galway East
Party	Candidate	FPv%	Count
Party	Candidate	FPv%	1
Fianna Fáil	Noel Treacy	50.2	16,337
Fine Gael	Ulick Burke	41.8	13,610
Labour	Kevin Dwyer	5.4	1,741
Independent	Norman Morgan	2.1	675
Independent	Brian Parker	0.5	177
Electorate: 42,226 Valid: 32,540 Quota: 16,271 Turnout: 77.1%

=== February 1982 general election ===
February 1982 general election: Galway East
Party	Candidate	FPv%	Count				
Party	Candidate	FPv%	1	2	3	4	5
Fine Gael	Paul Connaughton Snr	21.9	7,014	7,303	8,250		
Fianna Fáil	Michael P. Kitt	19.3	6,182	6,305	6,386	6,786	11,167
Fianna Fáil	Johnny Callanan	18.7	6,015	6,042	6,257	7,466	8,788
Fianna Fáil	Thomas Hussey	17.1	5,500	5,689	5,743	6,212	
Fine Gael	Ulick Burke	12.6	4,037	4,150	5,383		
Fine Gael	Joseph Brennan	7.5	2,403	2,566			
Labour	Kevin Dwyer	2.9	946				
Electorate: 41,655 Valid: 32,097 Spoilt: 250 (0.8%) Quota: 8,025 Turnout: 32,347 (77.7%)

=== 1981 general election ===
1981 general election: Galway East
Party	Candidate	FPv%	Count				
Party	Candidate	FPv%	1	2	3	4	5
Fine Gael	Paul Connaughton Snr	22.6	7,487	9,287			
Fianna Fáil	Johnny Callanan	19.1	6,326	6,441	6,457	7,582	9,370
Fianna Fáil	Michael P. Kitt	17.2	5,681	5,890	5,951	10,185	
Fianna Fáil	Thomas Hussey	16.6	5,502	5,850	5,929		
Fine Gael	Ulick Burke	13.0	4,301	5,559	6,420	6,709	6,833
Fine Gael	Joe Burke	11.5	3,793				
Electorate: 41,666 Valid: 33,090 Spoilt: 272 (0.8%) Quota: 8,273 Turnout: 33,362 (80.1%)

=== 1977 general election ===
1977 general election: Galway East
Party	Candidate	FPv%	Count						
Party	Candidate	FPv%	1	2	3	4	5	6	7
Fianna Fáil	Johnny Callanan	19.8	8,835	8,849	9,487				
Fianna Fáil	Thomas Hussey	14.2	6,345	6,398	6,641	6,737	6,959	9,881	
Fine Gael	John Donnellan	13.4	5,985	6,156	6,415	8,855	8,911	9,082	
Fine Gael	Paul Connaughton Snr	13.3	5,914	6,241	6,499	7,477	7,534	7,960	8,010
Fianna Fáil	Mark Killilea Jnr	12.8	5,714	5,855	5,928	5,962	6,021	7,963	8,872
Fianna Fáil	Michael P. Kitt	12.0	5,361	5,389	5,571	5,640	5,780		
Fine Gael	Brigid Hogan-O'Higgins	7.5	3,353	3,401	3,867				
Independent	Norman Morgan	5.0	2,225	2,281					
Labour	Harold Campbell	2.0	876						
Electorate: 56,064 Valid: 44,608 Spoilt: 304 (0.7%) Quota: 8,922 Turnout: 44,912 (80.1%)

=== 1965 general election ===
1965 general election: Galway East
Party	Candidate	FPv%	Count						
Party	Candidate	FPv%	1	2	3	4	5	6	7
Fine Gael	John Donnellan	26.6	11,109						
Fianna Fáil	Anthony Millar	13.9	5,790	5,836	5,909	5,995	6,423	6,512	7,079
Fianna Fáil	Michael F. Kitt	13.1	5,458	5,582	5,602	5,794	5,902	6,159	9,806
Fianna Fáil	Michael Carty	11.2	4,656	4,691	4,696	4,725	5,714	5,751	6,210
Fine Gael	Brigid Hogan-O'Higgins	10.3	4,309	6,084	6,487	6,842	7,097		
Fianna Fáil	Thomas Hussey	10.3	4,276	4,408	4,420	4,714	5,226	5,408	
Fianna Fáil	Patrick Fahey	5.9	2,468	2,544	2,549	2,613			
Independent	Pádraig Ó Ceallaigh	3.9	1,607	1,772	1,802				
Fine Gael	Sean Purcell	3.3	1,381	3,041	3,231	3,622	3,661		
Fine Gael	Gus Hynes	1.6	650	795					
Electorate: 53,823 Valid: 41,704 Quota: 6,951 Turnout: 77.5%

=== 1964 by-election ===
Clann na Talmhan TD Michael Donnellan died on 27 September 1964. A by-election was held to fill the vacancy on 3 December 1964. It was won by his son, John Donnellan, contesting for Fine Gael.

1964 by-election: Galway East
Party	Candidate	FPv%	Count	
Party	Candidate	FPv%	1	2
Fine Gael	John Donnellan	49.8	20,920	21,706
Fianna Fáil	Thomas Hussey	46.6	19,612	19,977
Sinn Féin	Pádraig Ó Ceallaigh	3.6	1,497	
Electorate: 53,823 Valid: 42,029 Quota: 21,015 Turnout: 78.1%

=== 1961 general election ===
1961 general election: Galway East
Party	Candidate	FPv%	Count					
Party	Candidate	FPv%	1	2	3	4	5	6
Fianna Fáil	Anthony Millar	15.8	6,325	6,442	6,647	7,799		
Fianna Fáil	Michael Carty	15.7	6,266	6,379	6,572	7,309		
Clann na Talmhan	Michael Donnellan	14.8	5,903	6,649	6,882			
Fianna Fáil	Michael F. Kitt	14.4	5,750	6,143	8,812			
Fine Gael	Brigid Hogan-O'Higgins	12.5	4,988	5,268	5,323	5,343	5,361	5,368
Fine Gael	Sean Purcell	9.3	3,729	4,404	4,628	4,777	4,888	4,952
Fianna Fáil	Mark Killilea Snr	8.9	3,547	3,781				
Sinn Féin	Pádraig Ó Ceallaigh	8.7	3,478					
Electorate: 54,788 Valid: 39,986 Quota: 6,665 Turnout: 73.0%

=== 1944 general election ===
Michael Gallagher notes the motive of the returning officer to conduct a second count was presumably to enable Stankard to keep his deposit.

1944 general election: Galway East
Party	Candidate	FPv%	Count	
Party	Candidate	FPv%	1	2
Fianna Fáil	Frank Fahy (Note: As outgoing Ceann Comhairle, Fahy was returned automatically under Art. 16.6 of the Constitution and the Electoral (Chairman of Dáil Éireann) Act 1937. He was elected again as Ceann Comhairle on 9 June 1944, leaving the Fianna Fáil parliamentary party.)	N/A	Returned automatically	
Fianna Fáil	Patrick Beegan	35.2	11,475	
Clann na Talmhan	Michael Donnellan	31.4	10,235	
Fianna Fáil	Mark Killilea Snr	25.9	8,449	
Clann na Talmhan	Edward Stankard	7.6	2,484	4,160
Electorate: 49,866 Valid: 32,643 Quota: 8,161 Turnout: 65.5%

=== 1943 general election ===
1943 general election: Galway East
Party	Candidate	FPv%	Count					
Party	Candidate	FPv%	1	2	3	4	5	6
Fianna Fáil	Frank Fahy (Note: As outgoing Ceann Comhairle, Fahy was returned automatically under Art. 16.6 of the Constitution and the Electoral (Chairman of Dáil Éireann) Act 1937. He was elected again as Ceann Comhairle on 1 July 1943, leaving the Fianna Fáil parliamentary party.)	N/A	Returned automatically					
Clann na Talmhan	Michael Donnellan	25.6	9,226					
Fianna Fáil	Patrick Beegan	24.0	8,638	8,645	8,725	8,870	9,818	
Fianna Fáil	Mark Killilea Snr	20.6	7,424	7,435	7,459	7,487	8,064	8,723
Labour	Robert Malachy Burke	13.9	5,029	5,059	5,184	5,604	5,723	5,756
Fine Gael	Seán Broderick	4.8	1,729	1,740	2,416	2,657	2,740	2,760
Fianna Fáil	Stephen Jordan	4.8	1,745	1,748	1,780	1,799		
Clann na Talmhan	Seán O'Kelly	3.1	1,101	1,255	1,396			
Fine Gael	Patrick Cawley	3.1	1,127	1,132				
Electorate: 49,866 Valid: 36,019 Quota: 9,005 Turnout: 72.2%

=== 1938 general election ===
1938 general election: Galway East
Party	Candidate	FPv%	Count			
Party	Candidate	FPv%	1	2	3	4
Fianna Fáil	Frank Fahy (Note: As outgoing Ceann Comhairle, Fahy was returned automatically under Art. 16.6 of the Constitution and the Electoral (Chairman of Dáil Éireann) Act 1937. He was elected again as Ceann Comhairle on 30 June 1938, leaving the Fianna Fáil parliamentary party.)	N/A	Returned automatically			
Fianna Fáil	Mark Killilea Snr	27.2	9,526			
Fianna Fáil	Patrick Beegan	25.1	8,804			
Fine Gael	Seán Broderick	18.1	6,339	6,367	7,171	11,079
Fine Gael	Patrick Cawley	11.8	4,140	4,158	4,559	
Fianna Fáil	Martin O'Regan	9.9	3,468	4,153	4,666	4,876
Labour	Robert Malachy Burke	7.9	2,753	2,790		
Electorate: 48,530 Valid: 35,030 Quota: 8,758 Turnout: 72.2%

=== 1937 general election ===
1937 general election: Galway East
Party	Candidate	FPv%	Count				
Party	Candidate	FPv%	1	2	3	4	5
Fianna Fáil	Frank Fahy (Note: As outgoing Ceann Comhairle, Fahy was returned automatically under s. 2 of the Electoral (Amendment) Act 1927, as adapted by the Electoral (Revision of Constituencies) Act 1935. He was elected again as Ceann Comhairle on 21 July 1937, leaving the Fianna Fáil parliamentary party.)	N/A	Returned automatically				
Fianna Fáil	Mark Killilea Snr	23.8	8,067	8,447	8,537		
Fianna Fáil	Patrick Beegan	23.5	7,978	8,744			
Fine Gael	Seán Broderick	17.3	5,867	6,571	6,594	6,594	10,567
Fine Gael	Patrick Cawley	12.6	4,275	4,713	4,720	4,720	
Fianna Fáil	Stephen Jordan	11.9	4,033	4,538	4,688	4,750	4,977
Labour	Robert Malachy Burke	10.8	3,672				
Electorate: 49,476 Valid: 33,892 Quota: 8,474 Turnout: 68.5%

== See also ==
- Elections in the Republic of Ireland
- Politics of the Republic of Ireland
- List of Dáil by-elections
- List of political parties in the Republic of Ireland
