= 2014 Galway County Council election =

Part of the 2014 Irish local elections

- 23 May 2014

All 39 seats on Galway County Council 20 seats needed for a majority
	First party	Second party	Third party
Party	Fine Gael	Fianna Fáil	Sinn Féin
Seats won	12	12	3
Seat change	-1	+5	+2
	Fourth party	Fifth party	Sixth party
Party	Republican Sinn Féin	Labour	Independent
Seats won	1	0	11
Seat change	-	-1	+4
- Map showing the area of Galway County Council
Council control before election
Fine Gael
Council control after election
Fine Gael

An election to all 39 seats on Galway County Council took place on 23 May 2014 as part of the 2014 Irish local elections, an increase from 30 seats at the 2009 election. County Galway was divided into 5 local electoral areas (LEAs) to elect councillors for a five-year term of office on the electoral system of proportional representation by means of the single transferable vote (PR-STV). In addition, the town councils of Ballinasloe, Loughrea and Tuam were all abolished.

Fine Gael remained the largest party in terms of votes while having the same seats as Fianna Fáil. Fine Gael lost 1 seat overall, in Loughrea, while Fianna Fáil made 5 gains; 1 each in Ballinasloe, Connemara, Athenry-Oranmore and 2 in Loughrea. Independents had another good election winning 4 additional seats while Sinn Féin made gains in Connemara and in Athenry-Oranmore. Republican Sinn Féin retained their solitary seat in Connemara.

== Results by party ==
Party	Seats	±	1st pref	FPv%	±%
Fine Gael	12	-1	21,063	27.6	
Fianna Fáil	12	+5	20,902	27.4	
Sinn Féin	3	+2	5,755	7.5	
Republican Sinn Féin	1	-	1,072	1.4	
Labour	0	-1	2,668	3.5	
Independent	11	+4	21,258	29.4	
Total	39	+9	72,718	100.0	—

== Results by local electoral area ==
*: Outgoing councillor.

=== Athenry–Oranmore ===
Athenry–Oranmore: 7 seats
Party	Candidate	FPv%	Count											
Party	Candidate	FPv%	1	2	3	4	5	6	7	8	9	10	11	12
Fine Gael	Peter Feeney	12.28	1,572	1,582	1,649									
Independent	Jim Cuddy	11.51	1,473	1,527	1,534	1,535	1,603							
Independent	James Charity	11.12	1,424	1,454	1,464	1,465	1,522	1,562	1,628					
Fianna Fáil	Malachy Noone	10.38	1,329	1,333	1,337	1,338	1,405	1,529	1,689					
Fianna Fáil	Cathal Moran	7.80	998	1,001	1,023	1,032	1,047	1,051	1,069	1,079	1,119	1,191	1,249	1,257
Sinn Féin	Gabriel Cronnelly	7.25	928	953	990	1,001	1,028	1,041	1,075	1,078	1,112	1,252	1,298	1,304
Fianna Fáil	Martina Kinane	6.92	886	918	930	933	948	965	979	985	1,195	1,249	1,270	1,276
Fine Gael	Frank Kearney	6.50	832	835	840	844	873	979	1,038	1,068	1,355	1,773		
Independent	David Collins	6.40	820	845	852	856	886	910	953	977	1,049			
Fine Gael	Liam Carroll	5.85	749	785	798	799	809	850	893	903				
Fine Gael	Josette Farrell	3.44	441	448	461	466	485							
Independent	Michael Ryan	3.09	395	422	428	430								
Labour	Clement Shevlin	2.76	354	363	452	458	489	556						
Labour	Madge Dean	2.43	311	317										
Independent	Roderick O'Driscoll	1.86	238											
Fís Nua	Suzanne O'Keeffe	0.41	53											
Electorate: 23,659 Valid: 12,803 (54.11%) Spoilt: 111 Quota: 1,601 Turnout: 12,914 (54.58%)

=== Ballinasloe ===
Ballinasloe: 6 seats
Party	Candidate	FPv%	Count					
Party	Candidate	FPv%	1	2	3	4	5	6
Independent	Tim Broderick	27.9%	3,275					
Sinn Féin	Dermot Connolly	17.5%	2,059					
Fianna Fáil	Michael Connolly	12.9%	1,514	1,800				
Fianna Fáil	Donal Burke	9.8%	1,154	1,389	1,463	1,489	1,554	1,616
Fine Gael	Michael Finnerty	7.2%	845	1,021	1,084	1,092	1,305	1,544
Fine Gael	Kevin Ryan	7.1%	835	970	992	1,027	1,081	
Fine Gael	Aidan Donohue	6.7%	785	1,164	1,206	1,227	1,312	1,702
Labour	Johnny Walsh	5.7%	664	826	919	923		
Fianna Fáil	Pat O'Sullivan	5.7%	615	838	924	951	1,161	1,225
Electorate: 20,380 Valid: 11,746 Spoilt: 140 Quota: 1,679 Turnout: 11,886 (58.3%)

=== Connemara ===
Connemara: 9 seats
Party	Candidate	FPv%	Count												
Party	Candidate	FPv%	1	2	3	4	5	6	7	8	9	10	11	12	13
Independent	Thomas Welby	13.6%	2,291												
Fianna Fáil	Seán Ó Tuairisg	7.5%	1,270	1,297	1,302	1,309	1,316	1,356	1,393	1,456	1,514	1,581	1,688		
Fine Gael	Eileen Mannion-Mullen	7.4%	1,251	1,310	1,333	1,375	1,421	1,429	1,436	1,442	1,545	1,556	1,627	1,870	
Fianna Fáil	Seamus Walsh	7.1%	1,203	1,297	1,307	1,312	1,319	1,355	1,366	1,384	1,415	1,431	1,467	1,629	1,670
Fine Gael	Niamh Byrne	7.1%	1,183	1,310	1,329	1,400	1,429	1,465	1,468	1,479	1,592	1,614	1,725		
Independent	Seosamh Ó Cualáin	6.9%	1,172	1,208	1,218	1,228	1,255	1,264	1,438	1,489	1,552	1,689			
Fianna Fáil	Noel Thomas	6.6%	1,114	1,187	1,192	1,198	1,214	1,254	1,258	1,266	1,285	1,300	1,311	1,382	1,390
Republican Sinn Féin	Tomás Ó Curraoin	6.4%	1,072	1,109	1,112	1,144	1,160	1,240	1,297	1,360	1,433	1,526	1,602	1,620	1,623
Fianna Fáil	Máirtín Lee	5.2%	882	885	885	887	888	915	934	991	1,106	1,140	1,224	1,306	1,311
Fianna Fáil	Josie Conneely	4.8%	800	819	838	839	851	870	887	891	893	894	904		
Sinn Féin	Tom Healy	4.6%	768	805	832	832	867	869	880	889	893	1,218	1,265	1,432	1,501
Labour	Joe Curran	3.9%	667	677	682	692	713	727	744	796	845	891			
Sinn Féin	Máirín Mhic Lochlainn	3.7%	627	639	648	649	663	669	718	776	814				
Fine Gael	Seosamh Ó Laoi	3.6%	610	615	619	668	673	686	695	718					
Independent	Dáithí Ó Cualáin	2.6%	440	446	458	459	471	473	551						
Independent	Pádraic Ó Conghaile	2.1%	354	359	403	404	411	414							
Fianna Fáil	Mac Dara Hosty	2.1%	345	350	351	393	402								
Fine Gael	Mary McHugh	1.8%	302	309	309										
Independent	Ronan Garvey	1.5%	256	288	325	336									
Independent	Liam Allen	1.1%	185	198											
Independent	Chris Walsh	0.3%	45	54											
Electorate: 30,734 Valid: 16,847 Spoilt: 244 Quota: 1,685 Turnout: 17,091 (55.6%)

=== Loughrea ===
Loughrea: 8 seats
Party	Candidate	FPv%	Count							
Party	Candidate	FPv%	1	2	3	4	5	6	7	8
Fianna Fáil	Anne Rabbitte	10.6%	1,729	1,731	1,793	1,840				
Fianna Fáil	Gerry Finnerty	10.5%	1,706	1,799	1,812					
Fine Gael	Michael 'Moegie' Maher	10.2%	1,651	1,663	1,775	1,951				
Fine Gael	Jimmy McClearn	10.0%	1,630	1,636	1,719	1,770	1,785	1,793	1,841	
Fine Gael	Joe Byrne	9.6%	1,560	1,602	1,626	1,642	1,647	1,647	1,693	1,699
Independent	Michael Fahy	8.8%	1,437	1,525	1,542	1,543	1,588	1,593	1,736	1,790
Independent	Pat Hynes	8.6%	1,394	1,416	1,498	1,704	1,755	1,761	1,988	
Fianna Fáil	Shane Donnellan	7.7%	1,257	1,268	1,348	1,472	1,522	1,534	1,619	1,639
Fine Gael	Bridie Willers	7.4%	1,200	1,284	1,324	1,372	1,387	1,388	1,448	1,455
Sinn Féin	Eoghan Mac Cormaic	4.8%	775	814	858	898	902	904		
Independent	James Regan	4.6%	745	766	834					
Labour	Dessie O'Brien	4.1%	672	693						
Independent	Adrian Feeney	3.0%	495							
Electorate: 28,343 Valid: 16,251 Spoilt: 191 Quota: 1,806 Turnout: 16,442 (58.0%)

=== Tuam ===
Tuam: 9 seats
Party	Candidate	FPv%	Count										
Party	Candidate	FPv%	1	2	3	4	5	6	7	8	9	10	11
Independent	Seán Canney	17.0%	3,171										
Fine Gael	Peter Roche	14.6%	2,708										
Independent	Michael Fitzmaurice	14.1%	2,621										
Fianna Fáil	Mary Hoade	10.1%	1,886										
Fine Gael	Tom McHugh	8.6%	1,598	1,854	2,102								
Fianna Fáil	Donagh Mark Killilea	5.2%	968	1,188	1,258	1,303	1,319	1,341	1,386	1,438	1,447	1,559	1,731
Independent	Karey McHugh	5.0%	934	1,118	1,272	1,360	1,388	1,469	1,624	1,880			
Independent	Shaun Cunniffe	4.8%	900	1,007	1,033	1,053	1,056	1,206	1,272	1,361	1,362	1,453	1,495
Fine Gael	Peter Keaveney	4.2%	780	809	854	1,149	1,189	1,194	1,205	1,222	1,222	1,421	1,687
Fianna Fáil	Eamonn Kitt	3.6%	661	819	913	942	969	979	1,017	1,042	1,045	1,127	1,313
Fianna Fáil	Nora Fahy	3.1%	585	629	666	853	856	862	876	915	917	935	
Sinn Féin	Maeve O'Brien	3.2%	598	649	686	732	736	766	793				
Fine Gael	Larry Bane	2.8%	521	667	741	756	806	828	864	885	894		
Independent	Teresa Killeen-Kelly	1.9%	362	430	473	495	501	523					
Independent	Thomas (T.P.) Niland	1.7%	323	369	387	399	403						
Electorate: 31,525 Valid: 18,616 Spoilt: 175 Quota: 1,862 Turnout: 18,791 (59.6%)

== Changes ==
=== Co-options ===
Party	Outgoing	LEA	Reason	Date	Co-optee
Independent	Michael Fitzmaurice	Tuam	Elected to the 31st Dáil at the 2014 Roscommon-South Leitrim by-election.	27 November 2014	Des Joyce
Fianna Fáil	Anne Rabbitte	Loughrea	Elected to the 32nd Dáil at the 2016 general election.	16 March 2016	Ivan Canning
Independent	Seán Canney	Tuam	Elected to the 32nd Dáil at the 2016 general election.	16 March 2016	Billy Connelly
Fianna Fáil	Michael (Stroke) Fahy	Loughrea	Death of councillor.	3 April 2019	Vacant

=== Changes in affiliation ===
Name	LEA	Elected as	New affiliation	Date
James Charity	Athenry-Oranmore	Independent	Renua	21 May 2015
James Charity	Athenry-Oranmore	Renua	Independent	30 July 2015
Gabriel Cronnelly	Athenry-Oranmore	Sinn Féin	Independent	3 December 2017
Michael (Stroke) Fahy	Loughrea	Independent	Fianna Fáil	12 December 2018
