= Ulick Burke (politician) =

Irish former politician (born 1943)

Teachta Dála
- In office May 2007 – February 2011
- In office June 1997 – May 2002
- Constituency: Galway East

Senator
- In office 12 September 2002 – 24 May 2007
- In office 23 February 1983 – 25 April 1987
- Constituency: Agricultural Panel
- In office 8 October 1981 – 13 May 1982
- Constituency: Nominated by the Taoiseach

Personal details
- Born: 19 November 1943 (age 82) Loughrea, County Galway, Ireland
- Party: Fine Gael
- Education: University College Galway

Ulick Burke (born 19 November 1943) is an Irish former Fine Gael politician. He served as a Teachta Dála (TD) for the Galway East constituency from 1997 to 2002 and 2007 to 2011, and was also a Senator for three terms.

After unsuccessfully contesting the 1981 general election in Galway East, Burke was nominated by the Taoiseach, Garret FitzGerald to the 15th Seanad. He was unsuccessful again at the February 1982 general election, and was defeated in the subsequent election to the 16th Seanad. After further Dáil defeats at a by-election in July 1982 and at the November 1982 general election, he was returned at the 1983 elections to the 17th Seanad, on the Agricultural Panel. He failed again at the 1987 general election, and lost his Seanad seat at the 1987 Seanad election.

Burke did not contest the 1992 general election, and was finally elected as a TD at the 1997 general election when the Galway East constituency was increased to 4 seats. He failed to be re-elected to Dáil Éireann at the 2002 general election, but was subsequently elected to the 22nd Seanad Éireann on the Agricultural Panel. He re-gained his Dáil seat at the 2007 general election.

He was the Fine Gael deputy spokesperson on Education with special responsibility for Lifelong Learning and School Transport from 2007 to 2011.

He retired from politics at the 2011 general election.

Dáil	Election	Deputy (Party)	Deputy (Party)	Deputy (Party)	Deputy (Party)
9th	1937	Frank Fahy (FF)	Mark Killilea Snr (FF)	Patrick Beegan (FF)	Seán Broderick (FG)
10th	1938	Frank Fahy (FF)	Mark Killilea Snr (FF)	Patrick Beegan (FF)	Seán Broderick (FG)
11th	1943	Frank Fahy (FF)	Mark Killilea Snr (FF)	Patrick Beegan (FF)	Michael Donnellan (CnaT)
12th	1944	Frank Fahy (FF)	Mark Killilea Snr (FF)	Patrick Beegan (FF)	Michael Donnellan (CnaT)
13th	1948	Constituency abolished. See Galway North and Galway South			

Dáil	Election	Deputy (Party)	Deputy (Party)	Deputy (Party)	Deputy (Party)	Deputy (Party)
17th	1961	Michael F. Kitt (FF)	Anthony Millar (FF)	Michael Carty (FF)	Michael Donnellan (CnaT)	Brigid Hogan-O'Higgins (FG)
17th	1964 by-election	Michael F. Kitt (FF)	Anthony Millar (FF)	Michael Carty (FF)	John Donnellan (FG)	Brigid Hogan-O'Higgins (FG)
18th	1965	Michael F. Kitt (FF)	Anthony Millar (FF)	Michael Carty (FF)	John Donnellan (FG)	Brigid Hogan-O'Higgins (FG)
19th	1969	Constituency abolished. See Galway North-East and Clare–South Galway				

Dáil	Election	Deputy (Party)	Deputy (Party)	Deputy (Party)	Deputy (Party)
21st	1977	Johnny Callanan (FF)	Thomas Hussey (FF)	Mark Killilea Jnr (FF)	John Donnellan (FG)
22nd	1981	Johnny Callanan (FF)	Michael P. Kitt (FF)	Paul Connaughton Snr (FG)	3 seats 1981–1997
23rd	1982 (Feb)	Johnny Callanan (FF)	Michael P. Kitt (FF)	Paul Connaughton Snr (FG)	3 seats 1981–1997
23rd	1982 by-election	Noel Treacy (FF)	Michael P. Kitt (FF)	Paul Connaughton Snr (FG)	3 seats 1981–1997
24th	1982 (Nov)	Noel Treacy (FF)	Michael P. Kitt (FF)	Paul Connaughton Snr (FG)	3 seats 1981–1997
25th	1987	Noel Treacy (FF)	Michael P. Kitt (FF)	Paul Connaughton Snr (FG)	3 seats 1981–1997
26th	1989	Noel Treacy (FF)	Michael P. Kitt (FF)	Paul Connaughton Snr (FG)	3 seats 1981–1997
27th	1992	Noel Treacy (FF)	Michael P. Kitt (FF)	Paul Connaughton Snr (FG)	3 seats 1981–1997
28th	1997	Noel Treacy (FF)	Michael P. Kitt (FF)	Paul Connaughton Snr (FG)	Ulick Burke (FG)
29th	2002	Noel Treacy (FF)	Joe Callanan (FF)	Paul Connaughton Snr (FG)	Paddy McHugh (Ind.)
30th	2007	Noel Treacy (FF)	Michael P. Kitt (FF)	Paul Connaughton Snr (FG)	Ulick Burke (FG)
31st	2011	Colm Keaveney (Lab)	Michael P. Kitt (FF)	Ciarán Cannon (FG)	Paul Connaughton Jnr (FG)
32nd	2016	Seán Canney (Ind.)	Anne Rabbitte (FF)	Ciarán Cannon (FG)	3 seats 2016–2024
33rd	2020	Seán Canney (Ind.)	Anne Rabbitte (FF)	Ciarán Cannon (FG)	3 seats 2016–2024
34th	2024	Seán Canney (Ind.)	Albert Dolan (FF)	Peter Roche (FG)	Louis O'Hara (SF)
