= 1982 Galway East by-election =

By-election to the 23rd Dáil

- 20 July 1982
- Turnout: 32,540 (77.1%)
	Treacy	Burke	Dwyer
Nominee	Noel Treacy	Ulick Burke	Kevin Dwyer
Party	Fianna Fáil	Fine Gael	Labour
First preferences	16,337	13,610	1,741
Percentage	50.2%	41.8%	5.4%
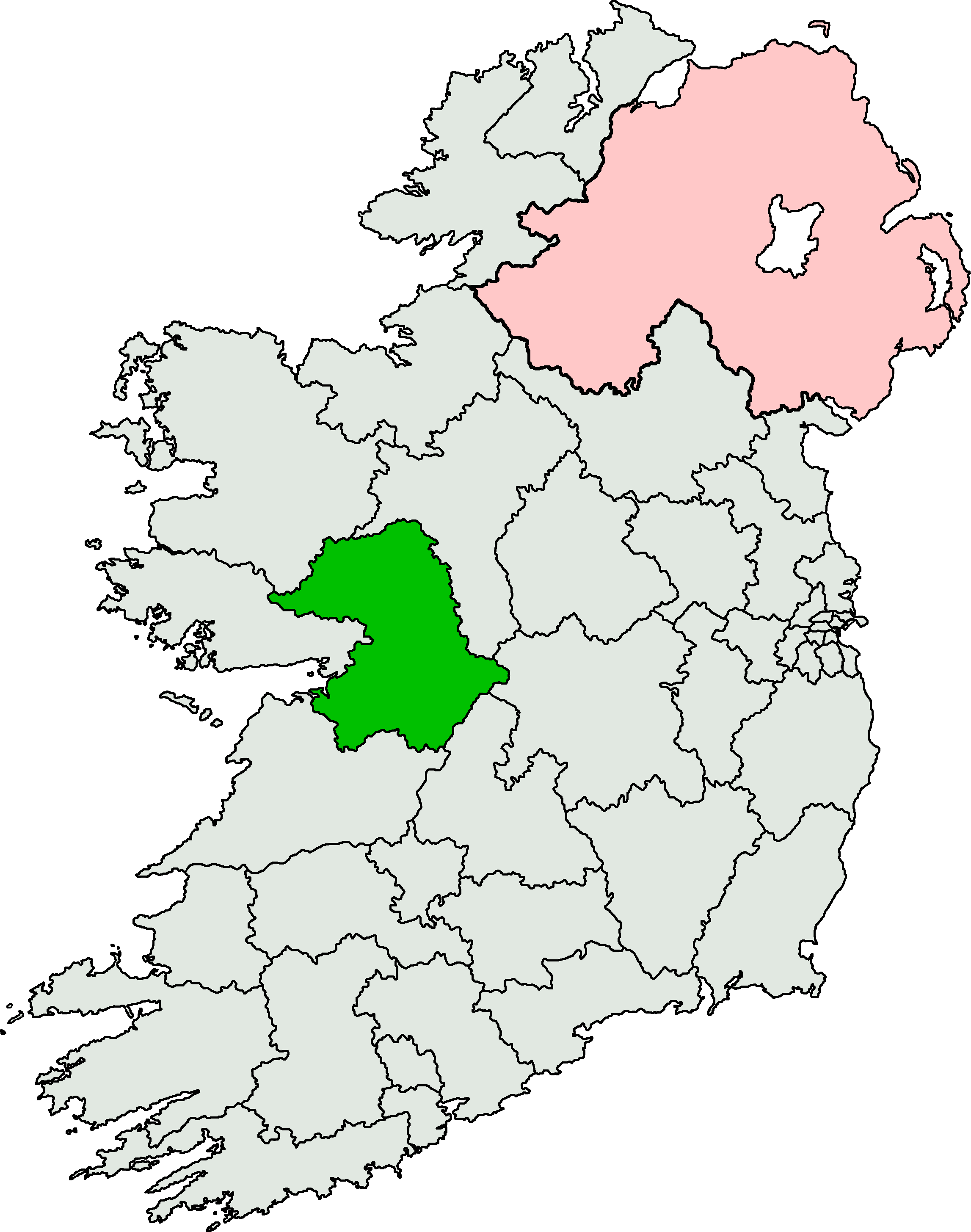
- Galway East shown within Ireland
TD before election
Johnny Callanan
Fianna Fáil
TD after election
Noel Treacy
Fianna Fáil

A Dáil by-election was held in the constituency of Galway East in Ireland on Tuesday, 20 July 1982, to fill a vacancy in the 23rd Dáil. It followed the death of Fianna Fáil Teachta Dála (TD) Johnny Callanan on 15 June 1982.

A government motion to issue the writ of election to fill the vacancy was agreed by the Dáil on 30 June 1982.

The by-election was won by the Fianna Fáil candidate Noel Treacy. It was the last time until the 2011 Dublin West by-election that a government party candidate won a by-election.

== Result ==
1982 Galway East by-election
Party	Candidate	FPv%	Count
Party	Candidate	FPv%	1
Fianna Fáil	Noel Treacy	50.2	16,337
Fine Gael	Ulick Burke	41.8	13,610
Labour	Kevin Dwyer	5.4	1,741
Independent	Norman Morgan	2.1	675
Independent	Brian Parker	0.5	177
Electorate: 42,226 Valid: 32,540 Quota: 16,271 Turnout: 77.1%
