= Noel Treacy =

Irish politician (1951–2022)

Minister of State
- 2004–2007: Foreign Affairs
- 2004–2007: Taoiseach
- 2002–2004: Agriculture and Food
- 1997–2002: Enterprise, Trade and Employment
- 1997–2002: Education and Science
- 1993–1994: Taoiseach
- 1993–1994: Finance
- 1993–1994: Transport, Energy and Communication
- 1992–1993: Finance
- Feb.–Nov. 1991: Justice
- 1989–1991: Health
- 1988–1989: Taoiseach
- 1987–1989: Finance

Teachta Dála
- In office July 1982 – February 2011
- Constituency: Galway East

Personal details
- Born: 18 December 1951 Ballinasloe, County Galway, Ireland
- Died: 2 February 2022 (aged 70) Galway, Ireland
- Party: Fianna Fáil
- Spouse: Mary Cloonan
- Children: 4
- Education: St. Joseph's College

Noel Treacy (18 December 1951 – 2 February 2022) was an Irish Fianna Fáil politician who served as a Minister of State in various government departments and a Teachta Dála (TD) for the Galway East constituency from 1982 to 2011.

== Early life ==
Treacy was born in Ballinasloe, County Galway, in 1951. He was educated at Gurteen National School and St. Joseph's College, Garbally Park in Ballinasloe. He worked as an auctioneer and financial services manager before entering public life. He was married to Mary Cloonan and had three daughters and one son.

== Political career ==
Treacy joined Fianna Fáil at 17 in 1969. Treacy was first elected to Dáil Éireann at a by-election in July 1982 caused by the death of Fianna Fáil TD Johnny Callanan and was re-elected at each election until his retirement in 2011. His election marked the last time a government party was successful in winning a by-election until the election of Patrick Nulty of the Labour Party in the 2011 Dublin West by-election. He was a member of Galway County Council from 1985 to 1991.

In March 1987, Fianna Fáil returned to government under Charles Haughey, and Treacy was appointed as Minister of State at the Department of Finance, with special responsibility for the Office of Public Works and the Central Development Committee. The following year he was appointed to an additional role as Minister of State at the Department of the Taoiseach, with responsibility for Heritage, the first minister assigned with this responsibility.

After the 1989 general election, Fianna Fáil formed a coalition government with the Progressive Democrats. Treacy was appointed as Minister of State at the Department of Health with responsibility for Children. In February 1991, he was reassigned as Minister of State at the Department of Justice with responsibility for Law Reform. He was sacked by Haughey in November 1991.

In February 1992, Albert Reynolds succeeded Haughey as Taoiseach, and Treacy was appointed again as Minister of State at the Department of Finance, with special responsibility for the Office of Public Works and the Central Development Committee. In January 1993, Fianna Fáil formed a coalition government with the Labour Party. Treacy was appointed as Minister of State at the Departments of the Taoiseach, at the Department of Finance and at the Department of Transport, Energy and Communications with responsibility for Energy. This government lost office in December 1994.

Fianna Fáil returned to government in June 1997 under Bertie Ahern as Taoiseach. In October 1997, Treacy was appointed Minister of State at the Department of Enterprise, Tourism and Employment and at the Department of Education and Science with responsibility for science and technology, replacing Michael Smith who had been promoted to cabinet following the resignation of Ray Burke. Following the 2002 general election, he was appointed Minister of State at the Department of Agriculture and Food, with responsibility for Food and Horticulture.

He unsuccessfully contested the 1999 European Parliament election in Connacht–Ulster.

In reshuffle in September 2004, Treacy was appointed as Minister of State at the Department of Foreign Affairs and at the Department of the Taoiseach, with special responsibility for European Affairs.

Treacy was returned to Dáil Éireann at the 2007 general election. This was his eighth successive time being elected. Following 17 years as a Minister of State in various governments, Treacy was not reappointed to a junior ministerial post by Taoiseach Bertie Ahern. He was subsequently appointed Chairman of Joint Oireachtas Committee on the implementation of the Good Friday Agreement.

He retired from politics at the 2011 general election.

== Personal life ==
Treacy served as the chairman of Galway County GAA Board for five years and, afterwards, served on the Connacht Council. He died on 2 February 2022, at the age of 70.

Political offices
Preceded by Avril Doyle	Minister of State at the Department of Finance; 1987–1989	Succeeded by Brendan Daly
Preceded by Vincent Brady; Máire Geoghegan-Quinn	Minister of State at the Department of the Taoiseach; 1988–1989; With: Vincent Brady; Máire Geoghegan-Quinn	Succeeded by Vincent Brady; Brendan Daly
Preceded by Terry Leyden	Minister of State at the Department of Health; 1989–1991	Succeeded by Chris Flood
Preceded by John O'Donoghue	Minister of State at the Department of Finance; 1992–1993	Succeeded by Noel Dempsey
Preceded by Brendan Kenneally as Minister of State at the Department of Tourism, Transport and Communications	Minister of State at the Department of Transport, Energy and Communications; 1993–1994	Succeeded by Emmet Stagg
Preceded by Tom Kitt; Michael Smith	Minister of State at the Department of Enterprise, Trade and Employment; 1997–2002; With: Tom Kitt	Succeeded by Michael Ahern; Frank Fahey
Preceded by Éamon Ó Cuív as Minister of State at the Department of Agriculture, Food and Rural Development	Minister of State at the Department of Agriculture and Food; 2002–2004; With: Liam Aylward	Succeeded by John Browne; Brendan Smith
Preceded by Dick Roche	Minister of State for European Affairs; 2004–2007	Succeeded by Dick Roche

Dáil	Election	Deputy (Party)	Deputy (Party)	Deputy (Party)	Deputy (Party)
9th	1937	Frank Fahy (FF)	Mark Killilea Snr (FF)	Patrick Beegan (FF)	Seán Broderick (FG)
10th	1938	Frank Fahy (FF)	Mark Killilea Snr (FF)	Patrick Beegan (FF)	Seán Broderick (FG)
11th	1943	Frank Fahy (FF)	Mark Killilea Snr (FF)	Patrick Beegan (FF)	Michael Donnellan (CnaT)
12th	1944	Frank Fahy (FF)	Mark Killilea Snr (FF)	Patrick Beegan (FF)	Michael Donnellan (CnaT)
13th	1948	Constituency abolished. See Galway North and Galway South			

Dáil	Election	Deputy (Party)	Deputy (Party)	Deputy (Party)	Deputy (Party)	Deputy (Party)
17th	1961	Michael F. Kitt (FF)	Anthony Millar (FF)	Michael Carty (FF)	Michael Donnellan (CnaT)	Brigid Hogan-O'Higgins (FG)
17th	1964 by-election	Michael F. Kitt (FF)	Anthony Millar (FF)	Michael Carty (FF)	John Donnellan (FG)	Brigid Hogan-O'Higgins (FG)
18th	1965	Michael F. Kitt (FF)	Anthony Millar (FF)	Michael Carty (FF)	John Donnellan (FG)	Brigid Hogan-O'Higgins (FG)
19th	1969	Constituency abolished. See Galway North-East and Clare–South Galway				

Dáil	Election	Deputy (Party)	Deputy (Party)	Deputy (Party)	Deputy (Party)
21st	1977	Johnny Callanan (FF)	Thomas Hussey (FF)	Mark Killilea Jnr (FF)	John Donnellan (FG)
22nd	1981	Johnny Callanan (FF)	Michael P. Kitt (FF)	Paul Connaughton Snr (FG)	3 seats 1981–1997
23rd	1982 (Feb)	Johnny Callanan (FF)	Michael P. Kitt (FF)	Paul Connaughton Snr (FG)	3 seats 1981–1997
23rd	1982 by-election	Noel Treacy (FF)	Michael P. Kitt (FF)	Paul Connaughton Snr (FG)	3 seats 1981–1997
24th	1982 (Nov)	Noel Treacy (FF)	Michael P. Kitt (FF)	Paul Connaughton Snr (FG)	3 seats 1981–1997
25th	1987	Noel Treacy (FF)	Michael P. Kitt (FF)	Paul Connaughton Snr (FG)	3 seats 1981–1997
26th	1989	Noel Treacy (FF)	Michael P. Kitt (FF)	Paul Connaughton Snr (FG)	3 seats 1981–1997
27th	1992	Noel Treacy (FF)	Michael P. Kitt (FF)	Paul Connaughton Snr (FG)	3 seats 1981–1997
28th	1997	Noel Treacy (FF)	Michael P. Kitt (FF)	Paul Connaughton Snr (FG)	Ulick Burke (FG)
29th	2002	Noel Treacy (FF)	Joe Callanan (FF)	Paul Connaughton Snr (FG)	Paddy McHugh (Ind.)
30th	2007	Noel Treacy (FF)	Michael P. Kitt (FF)	Paul Connaughton Snr (FG)	Ulick Burke (FG)
31st	2011	Colm Keaveney (Lab)	Michael P. Kitt (FF)	Ciarán Cannon (FG)	Paul Connaughton Jnr (FG)
32nd	2016	Seán Canney (Ind.)	Anne Rabbitte (FF)	Ciarán Cannon (FG)	3 seats 2016–2024
33rd	2020	Seán Canney (Ind.)	Anne Rabbitte (FF)	Ciarán Cannon (FG)	3 seats 2016–2024
34th	2024	Seán Canney (Ind.)	Albert Dolan (FF)	Peter Roche (FG)	Louis O'Hara (SF)
