= Toddie Byrne =

Irish politician (1934–2006)

Senator
- In office 8 October 1981 – 23 February 1983
- Constituency: Labour Panel

Personal details
- Born: Thomas Byrne; 13 April 1934 County Galway, Ireland
- Died: 4 April 2006 (aged 71) County Galway, Ireland
- Party: Fine Gael
- Education: St Patrick's College, Dublin

Thomas Byrne (13 April 1934 – 4 April 2006) was an Irish Fine Gael politician.

He was educated at St Mary's College, Galway, and trained as a National School teacher at St Patrick's College of Education, Drumcondra, Dublin.

He stood unsuccessfully for Dáil Éireann at the 1969, 1973 and 1977 general elections. He was elected to Seanad Éireann in 1981 for the Labour Panel constituency. He was re-elected at the 1982 election but lost his seat at the 1983 Seanad election. He was a member of Galway County Council for the Loughrea area from 1967 to 1999.
