= Joe Callanan =

Irish politician (1949–2026)

Teachta Dála
- In office May 2002 – May 2007
- Constituency: Galway East

Personal details
- Born: 30 January 1949 Kilconnell, County Galway, Ireland
- Died: 29 September 2026 (aged 77) County Galway, Ireland
- Party: Fianna Fáil
- Spouse: Noreen Callanan
- Children: 6
- Relatives: Johnny Callanan (uncle)

Joe Callanan (30 January 1949 – 29 September 2026) was an Irish Fianna Fáil politician.

== Life and career ==
Callanan was born in Kilconnell, County Galway on 30 January 1949. He was a member of Galway County Council from 1982 to 2003. He was a Teachta Dála (TD) for the Galway East constituency. Callanan was elected to Dáil Éireann at the 2002 general election but lost his seat at the 2007 general election.

He was a nephew of Johnny Callanan, a TD for Galway from 1973 to 1982.

Callanan died on 29 September 2026, at the age of 77.

== See also ==
- Families in the Oireachtas

| Dáil | Election | Deputy (Party) | Deputy (Party) | Deputy (Party) | Deputy (Party) |
|---|---|---|---|---|---|
| 9th | 1937 | Frank Fahy (FF) | Mark Killilea Snr (FF) | Patrick Beegan (FF) | Seán Broderick (FG) |
| 10th | 1938 | Frank Fahy (FF) | Mark Killilea Snr (FF) | Patrick Beegan (FF) | Seán Broderick (FG) |
| 11th | 1943 | Frank Fahy (FF) | Mark Killilea Snr (FF) | Patrick Beegan (FF) | Michael Donnellan (CnaT) |
| 12th | 1944 | Frank Fahy (FF) | Mark Killilea Snr (FF) | Patrick Beegan (FF) | Michael Donnellan (CnaT) |
| 13th | 1948 | Constituency abolished. See Galway North and Galway South | | | |

| Dáil | Election | Deputy (Party) | Deputy (Party) | Deputy (Party) | Deputy (Party) | Deputy (Party) |
|---|---|---|---|---|---|---|
| 17th | 1961 | Michael F. Kitt (FF) | Anthony Millar (FF) | Michael Carty (FF) | Michael Donnellan (CnaT) | Brigid Hogan-O'Higgins (FG) |
| 17th | 1964 by-election | Michael F. Kitt (FF) | Anthony Millar (FF) | Michael Carty (FF) | John Donnellan (FG) | Brigid Hogan-O'Higgins (FG) |
| 18th | 1965 | Michael F. Kitt (FF) | Anthony Millar (FF) | Michael Carty (FF) | John Donnellan (FG) | Brigid Hogan-O'Higgins (FG) |
| 19th | 1969 | Constituency abolished. See Galway North-East and Clare–South Galway | | | | |

| Dáil | Election | Deputy (Party) | Deputy (Party) | Deputy (Party) | Deputy (Party) |
|---|---|---|---|---|---|
| 21st | 1977 | Johnny Callanan (FF) | Thomas Hussey (FF) | Mark Killilea Jnr (FF) | John Donnellan (FG) |
| 22nd | 1981 | Johnny Callanan (FF) | Michael P. Kitt (FF) | Paul Connaughton Snr (FG) | 3 seats 1981–1997 |
| 23rd | 1982 (Feb) | Johnny Callanan (FF) | Michael P. Kitt (FF) | Paul Connaughton Snr (FG) | 3 seats 1981–1997 |
| 23rd | 1982 by-election | Noel Treacy (FF) | Michael P. Kitt (FF) | Paul Connaughton Snr (FG) | 3 seats 1981–1997 |
| 24th | 1982 (Nov) | Noel Treacy (FF) | Michael P. Kitt (FF) | Paul Connaughton Snr (FG) | 3 seats 1981–1997 |
| 25th | 1987 | Noel Treacy (FF) | Michael P. Kitt (FF) | Paul Connaughton Snr (FG) | 3 seats 1981–1997 |
| 26th | 1989 | Noel Treacy (FF) | Michael P. Kitt (FF) | Paul Connaughton Snr (FG) | 3 seats 1981–1997 |
| 27th | 1992 | Noel Treacy (FF) | Michael P. Kitt (FF) | Paul Connaughton Snr (FG) | 3 seats 1981–1997 |
| 28th | 1997 | Noel Treacy (FF) | Michael P. Kitt (FF) | Paul Connaughton Snr (FG) | Ulick Burke (FG) |
| 29th | 2002 | Noel Treacy (FF) | Joe Callanan (FF) | Paul Connaughton Snr (FG) | Paddy McHugh (Ind.) |
| 30th | 2007 | Noel Treacy (FF) | Michael P. Kitt (FF) | Paul Connaughton Snr (FG) | Ulick Burke (FG) |
| 31st | 2011 | Colm Keaveney (Lab) | Michael P. Kitt (FF) | Ciarán Cannon (FG) | Paul Connaughton Jnr (FG) |
| 32nd | 2016 | Seán Canney (Ind.) | Anne Rabbitte (FF) | Ciarán Cannon (FG) | 3 seats 2016–2024 |
| 33rd | 2020 | Seán Canney (Ind.) | Anne Rabbitte (FF) | Ciarán Cannon (FG) | 3 seats 2016–2024 |
| 34th | 2024 | Seán Canney (Ind.) | Albert Dolan (FF) | Peter Roche (FG) | Louis O'Hara (SF) |
