= List of Galway people =

This is a list of notable people from Galway, city in the West of Ireland, in the province of Connacht.

== List ==
- Thomas Arthur, comte de Lally, Baron de Tollendal (1702-1766)
- Margaret Athy, founder of St. Augustine's Convent, Galway
- Nora Barnacle, wife of James Joyce
- Francis Barrett, professional boxer
- Joseph Henry Blake (1797–1849), 3rd Baron Wallscourt
- Áine Brady
- Brian Brosnan, retired national boxing champion
- Sister Mary Bonaventure Browne, Poor Clares nun and historian
- Ken Bruen, author
- Peadar de Burca, actor, playwright, comedian
- Joe Burke, All Ireland accordion champion (1950, 1951)
- Robert Malachy Burke, Christian Socialist development worker
- Ulick Burke
- Evan Campbell, electronic music producer and DJ known professionally as Kettama
- Ciarán Cannon
- Eamon Casey, Roman Catholic bishop
- J. J. Clancy, MP
- Paul Connaughton Jnr
- Paul Connaughton Snr
- Catherine Connolly, president (2025—present)
- Nicola Coughlan, actress
- Anthony Daly (Whiteboy) (ex.1820)
- Margaretta D'Arcy, (1934-2025), actress, writer, playwright, and activist
- Patrick D'Arcy, lawyer and Confederate Ireland leader
- Patrick Deeley, poet, memoirist and children's writer
- Richard Donovan, long-distance runner
- Anthony Duane (1679–1747)
- Luke Duffy, trade unionist; Senator
- Niamh Fahey, soccer player
- Jim Fahy, RTÉ reporter
- Elaine Feeney, Irish writer
- Mickey Finn, fiddler
- David Forde, soccer player
- J. D. Geoghegan, American politician
- Máire Geoghegan-Quinn
- Pat Gibson, a top prize winner on Who Wants to Be a Millionaire?
- Eamon Gilmore
- Julian Gough, writer and former lead singer of Toasted Heretic
- Noel Grealish
- Lady Gregory (1852–1932)
- James Hardiman
- Frank Harris
- Michael D. Higgins, 9th president of Ireland
- Rita Ann Higgins (born 1955)
- Cáit Keane
- Dolores Keane, musician
- Colm Keaveney
- Aifric Keogh, rower, Olympic bronze medalist Tokyo 2020
- Richard Kirwan
- Michael P. Kitt
- Tom Kitt
- Seán Kyne
- Gerard Lally (fl. 1689–1737)
- Graham Lee, jockey
- Tony Lundon (born 1979), pop singer
- Angela Lynch
- Patrick Lynch, Roman Catholic bishop of Charleston, South Carolina
- Patrick Lynch, Irish emigrant to Argentina; ancestor of Che Guevara
- Peirce Lynch (fl. 1485)
- Walter Macken (1915–1967)
- Richard Martin fitz Oliver (1602–1648), father of Richard Martin ("Humanity Dick")
- Violet Florence Martin (1862–1915)
- Edward Martyn (1859–1923)
- Gerard A. Hays McCoy (1911–1975)
- Pádraic McCormack
- Pat McDonagh, Businessman, founder of Supermac's
- Bishop James McLoughlin
- Pauline McLynn, actress
- Mary Mitchell O'Connor
- Kieran Molloy, professional boxer
- Aoife Mulholland, musical actress
- Rónán Mullen, columnist with the Irish Daily Mail
- Brendan Murray, musician
- Hildegarde Naughton
- Derek Nolan
- Nora-Jane Noone, actress
- Brendan O'Brien, cricketer
- Pádraic Ó Conaire, Irish language author
- Éamon Ó Cuív, Fianna Fáil politician
- Liam O'Flaherty
- Dessie O'Halloran
- William O'Halloran, trade union pioneer
- Gideon Ouseley
- Anne Rabbitte
- Marc Roberts
- Tom Senier, Irish melodeon player
- John Sealy Townsend (1869–1957), mathematical physicist
- Noel Treacy
- Matthew Tullie
- Bríd Uí Murchú, writer (Arron Connolly) footballer
- Alexander Young

== See also ==
- List of Irish people
- List of NUI Galway people
