= List of American politicians of Irish descent =

This is a list of notable Irish American politicians.

To be included in this list, the person must have a Wikipedia article and/or references showing the person is Irish American and a notable politician.

== A–L ==
- William Armstrong – US Congressman, Virginia State Delegate
- Chester A. Arthur – 21st President of the United States
- David Baird Sr. – born in County Londonderry, Ireland, US Senator
- David Baird Jr. – son of David Baird Sr.; US Senator
- Samuel Fleming Barr – US Congressman
- James G. Barry – St. Louis mayor
- William B. Barry – US Congressman
- William Beatty – US Congressman, Pennsylvania State Representative
- Andrew Beirne – US Congressman, Virginia State Delegate
- Joe Biden – 46th President of the United States, 47th Vice President of the United States; mother was of Irish ancestry, father of partial Irish ancestry
- Edward P. Boland – US Congressman
- John R. Bohan – Wisconsin State Senator, Wisconsin State Assemblyman
- James E. Boyd – Nebraska governor, Omaha mayor, Nebraska State Representative
- Brendan Boyle – US Congressman
- Bob Brady – US Congressman
- William J. Brady – New Mexico Territorial representative and Sheriff of Lincoln County, from County Cavan
- David C. Broderick – US Senator
- John T. Browne – Houston mayor
- William Jennings Bryan – US Secretary of State
- Billy Bulger – President of the Massachusetts State Senate
- Aedanus Burke – Chief Justice of the South Carolina Supreme Court, US Congressman, South Carolina Representative
- Thomas Burke – North Carolina governor
- Thomas A. Burke – Cleveland mayor, US Senator
- William J. Burke – US Congressman
- Thomas Burnside – Associate Justice of the Pennsylvania Supreme Court, US Congressman, Pennsylvania State Senator
- Prescott Bush – banker/US Senator
- Pierce Butler – U.S. Senator, Delegate to the Congress of the Confederation
- Brendan Byrne – former Governor of New Jersey
- Jane Byrne – Chicago mayor
- Thomas R. Byrne – St. Paul mayor
- James F. Byrnes – US Senator
- William T. Cahill – New Jersey governor
- Thompson Campbell – US Congressman, Secretary of State of Illinois
- Timothy J. Campbell – US Congressman, New York State Senator, New York State Assemblyman
- Hugh Carey – New York governor
- Patrick J. Carley – US Congressman
- Christopher P. Carney – US Congressman
- Charles Carroll of Carrollton – the sole Catholic signatory of the American Declaration of Independence
- Bob Casey Jr. – US Senator and former Pennsylvania state treasurer
- Robert P. Casey – former Pennsylvania governor
- Eugene Casserly – US Senator
- Bill Cassidy – US Senator
- Sean Casten – US Congressman
- Jerome Cavanagh – Detroit mayor
- John Michael Clancy – US Congressman, New York State Assemblyman
- Daniel Clark – US Delegate
- Grover Cleveland – 22nd and 24th President of the United States
- Bill Clinton – 42nd President of the United States
- DeWitt Clinton – New York City mayor
- W. Bourke Cockran – US Congressman
- John F. Collins – Boston mayor
- Patrick Collins – Boston mayor, US Congressman, Massachusetts State Senator, Massachusetts State Representative
- Susan Collins – US Senator
- Martin Condon – Knoxville mayor
- John Conness – US Senator and California State Assemblyman
- James Cooney – US Congressman
- Chris Coons - US Senator
- John Coughlin – First Ward Alderman in Chicago, 1893–1938
- Thomas J. Creamer – US Congressman, New York State Assemblyman, New York State Senator
- Richard Croker – Tammany Hall boss
- Joseph Crowley – US Congressman
- Ted Cruz - Texas Senator
- William Cullen – US Congressman
- John Cunneen – New York attorney general
- James Michael Curley – legendary Boston mayor, US Congressman, and Massachusetts governor
- Thomas Cusack – US Congressman
- Richard J. Daley – Chicago mayor
- Richard M. Daley – Chicago mayor; son of Richard J. Daley
- William M. Daley – U.S. Secretary of Commerce; son of Richard J. Daley
- Charles Patrick Daly – Chief Justice of New York Court of Common Pleas
- John Darragh – Pittsburgh mayor
- Harry M. Daugherty – US Attorney General, Ohio State Representative
- Jefferson Davis – Confederate President
- Robert T. Davis – US Congressman, Fall River, Massachusetts Mayor
- William Dawson – St. Paul mayor
- Éamon de Valera (1882–1975) – President of Ireland, dominant political figure in 20th-century Ireland
- John J. Dempsey – New Mexico governor
- John N. Dempsey – Connecticut governor
- Thomas Dongan governor of New York In the 1660s
- Michael Donohoe – US Congressman
- Bob Dornan – former US Congressman from California
- John G. Downey – California governor, California lieutenant governor, Calfironia State Assemblyman
- Mike Doyle – US Congressman from Pennsylvania
- James Duane – New York City mayor
- William J. Duane – 11th U.S. Secretary of the Treasury
- Warren J. Duffey – US Congressman from Ohio, also Ohio's 9th congressional district
- Tom Dunn – Mayor, Elizabeth, New Jersey
- Edward Fitzsimmons Dunne – Chicago mayor and Illinois governor
- Dick Durbin – US Senator
- Thomas F. Eagleton – US Senator Missouri 1968–1987; grandfather born in County Mayo; paternal grandmother also Irish
- Thomas Addis Emmet – New York attorney general
- John Ewing – US Congressman
- Mark M. Fagan – Jersey City mayor
- Mike Fahey – Omaha mayor
- James G. Fair – US Senator
- Thomas Fallon – San Jose mayor
- James A. Farley – Chairman of the Democratic National Committee, US Postmaster General
- Michael F. Farley – US Congressman
- John Frederick Finerty – US Congressman
- Joseph E. Finerty – Gary mayor
- William Findley – US Congressman, Pennsylvania Supreme Executive Counsellor
- John F. Fitzgerald – Boston mayor, father of Rose Kennedy
- John Fitzpatrick – New Orleans mayor
- Mike Fitzpatrick – US Congressman from Pennsylvania
- Thomas Fitzsimons – US Congressman
- Peter F. Flaherty – former Pittsburgh mayor
- Michael P. Flanagan – US Congressman
- Daniel J. Flood – US Congressman from Pennsylvania
- Raymond Flynn – Boston mayor
- William S. Flynn – Rhode Island governor
- Mark Foley – US Congressman from Florida
- Michael Forbes – former US Congressman from New York
- Nicholas Ford – US Congressman
- John H. Frey - CT Republican National Committee Committeeman, former 11 term member CT House of Representatives
- Thomas Gallagher – Pittsburgh mayor
- Martin Galvin – founder of NORAID
- William F. Galvin – Massachusetts Secretary of State
- J. Joseph Garrahy – Rhode Island governor
- William Jay Gaynor – New York City mayor
- J. D. Geoghegan – Washington State representative
- Charles P. Gillen – Newark mayor
- James Gillespie – US Congressman
- Kirsten Gillibrand – US Senator, mother is of Irish descent
- Thomas F. Gilroy – New York City mayor
- James P. Gleason – County executive of Montgomery County, Maryland
- Patrick Gleason – Long Island City political machine boss and mayor
- Martin H. Glynn – New York governor
- William R. Grace – New York City mayor
- J. Harold Grady – Baltimore mayor
- James M. Graham – US Congressman
- William T. Granahan – US Congressman
- Ulysses S. Grant – 18th President of the United States
- Horace Greeley – Newspaper publisher/US Congressman
- James D. Griffin – Mayor of Buffalo, New York, New York State Senator
- James Gunn – US Congressman
- Frank Hague – Jersey City mayor
- R. Phillip Haire – North Carolina state Representative
- James M. Hanley – US Congressman
- Warren G. Harding – 29th President of the United States
- Alexander Harper – US Congressman, Ohio State Representative
- Benjamin Harrison – 23rd President of the United States
- Maura Healey – Massachusetts Attorney General
- Jerramiah T. Healy – Jersey City mayor
- William Randolph Hearst – Newspaper publisher/US Congressman
- James J. Heffernan – US Congressman
- Brian Higgins – US Congressman
- John Hogan – US Congressman
- Larry Hogan – governor of Maryland
- John Patrick Hopkins – Chicago mayor
- Harry R. Hughes – Governor of Maryland
- Richard J. Hughes – Governor of New Jersey
- William Hughes – US Senator and US Congressman
- Charles F. Hurley – Massachusetts governor
- Denis M. Hurley – US Congressman
- Robert A. Hurley – Connecticut Governor
- Henry Hyde – US Congressman
- John F. Hylan – New York City mayor
- John B. Hynes – Boston mayor
- Andrew Jackson – 7th President of the United States
- Andrew Johnson – 17th President of the United States
- Lyndon B. Johnson – 36th President of the United States
- Charles W. Jones – US Senator and Florida State Representative
- John Johnson – US Congressman and Ohio State Senator
- Thomas Kean – former Governor of New Jersey
- Frank Keating – Oklahoma governor
- William J. Keating – former Congressman from Ohio
- Augustine B. Kelley – US Congressman
- Patrick H. Kelley – US Congressman
- Edward A. Kelly – US Congressman
- Edward Joseph Kelly – Chicago mayor
- John Kelly – Tammany Hall boss
- Joseph J. Kelly – Buffalo mayor
- Mark Kelly – US Senator
- Randy Kelly – St. Paul mayor
- Richard C. Kerens – Ambassador to Austria-Hungary 1909–1913
- Michael Kenna – First Ward Alderman in Chicago 1897–1923

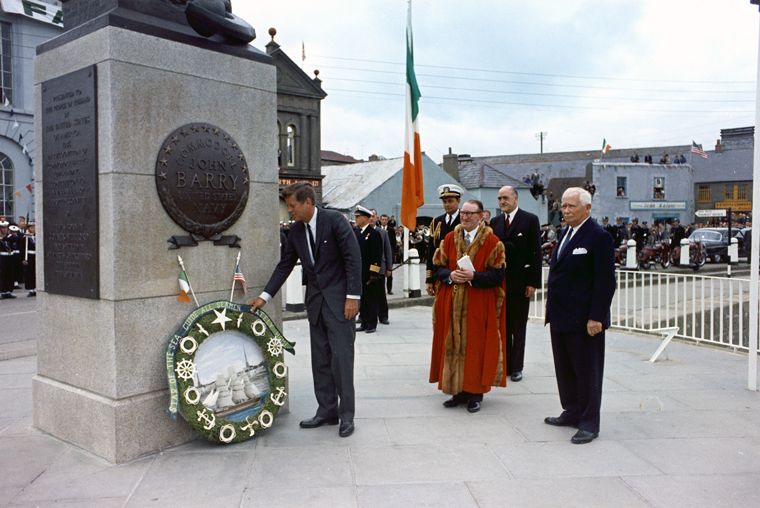
United States President John F. Kennedy laying a wreath at the Commodore John Barry Memorial in Wexford, Ireland in 1963

- Caroline Kennedy – US Ambassador
- Edward M. Kennedy – longtime US Senator
- Edward M. Kennedy, Jr – Connecticut State Senator
- John F. Kennedy – 35th President of the United States
- Joseph P. Kennedy – US Ambassador
- Joseph P. Kennedy II – former US Congressman
- Joseph P. Kennedy III – US Congressman
- Kathleen Kennedy Townsend – former Lieutenant Governor of Maryland
- Mark Kennedy – former US Congressman
- Patrick J. Kennedy – former Member Massachusetts House of Representatives; former Massachusetts Senator
- Patrick J. Kennedy II – former US Congressman
- Robert F. Kennedy – US Attorney General, US Senator, New York
- Jean Kennedy Smith – former US Ambassador
- Martin H. Kennelly – Chicago mayor
- John V. Kenny – Jersey City mayor
- John Kerrigan – Boston mayor
- Peter T. King – US Congressman
- Thomas Kirker – Ohio governor, Speaker of the Ohio Senate, Ohio State Senator, Speaker of the Ohio House of Representatives, Ohio State Representative
- Conor Lamb – US Congressman
- Patrick Leahy – US Senator, father is of Irish descent
- Huey Long – Louisiana governor
- Robert Lowry – US Congressman
- Stephen Lynch – US Congressman
- Thomas Lynch Jr. – signatory to the Declaration of Independence

== M–Z ==
- Lisa Madigan – Illinois Attorney General
- Michael Madigan – Illinois Speaker of the House, Illinois Democratic Party Chairman
- George Maguire – St. Louis mayor
- Dan Malloy – Connecticut governor; Stamford, CT mayor
- Stephen Mallory – Confederate States Secretary of the Navy, US Senator
- Sean Patrick Maloney – US Congressman
- Frederick Mansfield – Boston mayor
- Mike Mansfield – US Senator, Ambassador
- Thomas J. Manton – US Congressman
- Edward Markey – US Senator
- Malachi Martin – Speaker of the Florida House of Representatives
- William McAdoo – Assistant Secretary of the Navy, US Congressman, New York City Police Commissioner, New Jersey State Assemblyman
- William McAleer – US Congressman
- Gerald McCann – Jersey City mayor
- Patrick McCarran – US Senator
- Carolyn McCarthy – US Congressman
- Eugene McCarthy – US Senator
- Joseph McCarthy – US Senator
- Kevin McCarthy – Speaker of the House
- Leo T. McCarthy – California lieutenant governor, California State Assembly speaker, San Francisco supervisor
- P. H. McCarthy – San Francisco mayor
- William C. McCarthy – Pittsburgh mayor
- Blair McClenachan – US Congressman, Pennsylvania State Representative
- Mitch McConnell –Senate Minority Leader
- Frank McCoppin – San Francisco mayor
- John W. McCormack – Speaker of the House
- William McCreery – US Congressman
- Jim McDermott – US Congressman
- John J. McDonough – St. Paul mayor
- Lawrence E. McGann – US Congressman
- J. Howard McGrath – US Senator, Rhode Island governor
- John J. McGrath – US Congressman
- James McGreevey – New Jersey governor
- Edwin D. McGuinness – Providence mayor
- James Kennedy McGuire – Syracuse mayor
- Thomas McKean – signatory to the Declaration of Independence
- Bernard J. McKenna – Pittsburgh mayor
- Joseph McKenna – US Attorney General
- William McKinley – 25th President of the United States
- John McKinly – Delaware president
- Hugh McLaughlin – Brooklyn Democratic party boss
- Joseph McLaughlin – US Congressman
- Robert McNamara – United States Secretary of Defense under President John F. Kennedy
- Frank J. McNulty – US Congressman
- Michael R. McNulty – US Congressman
- Marty Meehan – US Congressman
- John Purroy Mitchel – New York City mayor
- Robert M. Moore – Cincinnati mayor
- Jim Moran – US Congressman
- John Morrissey – US Congressman
- William J. Moxley – US Congressman
- Daniel Patrick Moynihan – former US Senator
- P. H. Moynihan – US Congressman
- Bryan Mullanphy – St. Louis mayor
- William D. Mullins – member of the Massachusetts House of Representatives and baseball player
- Lisa Murkowski – US Senator
- Charles F. Murphy – Tammany Hall boss
- Chris Murphy – US Senator and former Congressman
- Dick Murphy – San Diego mayor
- Frank Murphy – Detroit mayor, Michigan governor
- George Murphy – US Senator
- Isaac Murphy – Arkansas governor
- Morgan F. Murphy – US Congressman
- Philip D. Murphy – New Jersey governor
- Timothy Murphy – US Congressman
- Tom Murphy – Pittsburgh mayor
- William T. Murphy – US Congressman
- James C. Murray – US Congressman
- Timothy P. Murray – Lieutenant Governor of Massachusetts
- John Murtha – US Congressman
- Richard Neal – US Congressman
- Richard Nixon – 37th President of the United States
- Michael N. Nolan – US Congressman, Albany mayor
- Mary T. Norton – US Congressman
- Barack Obama – 44th President of the United States
- Frank O'Bannon – Indiana governor
- Christopher D. O'Brien – St. Paul mayor
- Hugh O'Brien – Boston's first Irish mayor
- James O'Brien – US Congressman
- John P. O'Brien – New York City mayor
- Thomas J. O’Brien – US Congressman
- Dan O'Connell – Albany mayor
- Bob O'Connor – Mayor of Pittsburgh
- Maureen O'Connor – San Diego mayor
- Herbert R. O'Conor – Maryland governor
- Kenneth O'Donnell – Senior Aide to President John F Kennedy
- William O'Dwyer – New York City mayor
- James A. O'Gorman – US Senator
- Barratt O'Hara – US Congressman
- Arthur J. O'Keefe – New Orleans mayor
- George T. Oliver – US Senator
- Martin O'Malley – Baltimore mayor
- Charles H. O'Neill – Jersey City mayor
- Thomas O'Neill – Speaker of the House
- William A. O'Neill – Connecticut governor
- Daniel O'Reilly – US Congressman
- Beto O'Rourke, – US Congressman and Presidential candidate
- George F. O'Shaunessy – US Congressman
- George Pataki – New York governor
- William Paterson – US Supreme Court Associate Justice, 2nd Governor of New Jersey, US Senator, 1st Attorney General of New Jersey
- Thomas M. Patterson – US Senator, US Congressman, and Territorial Delegate
- Mike Pence – 48th Vice President of the United States; 50th Governor of Indiana
- Tom Pendergast – Kansas City Democratic machine boss
- James D. Phelan – San Francisco mayor, US Senator
- George Washington Plunkitt – Tammany Hall member
- Alexander Porter – US Senator, Louisiana Supreme Court Associate Justice, Louisiana State Representative
- John Logan Power – Mississippi secretary of state
- Samantha Power – US Ambassador
- William Prince – US Congressman, Indiana State Representative, Indiana State Senator
- Jack Quinn – US Congressman
- John Quinn – US Congressman, New York State Assemblyman

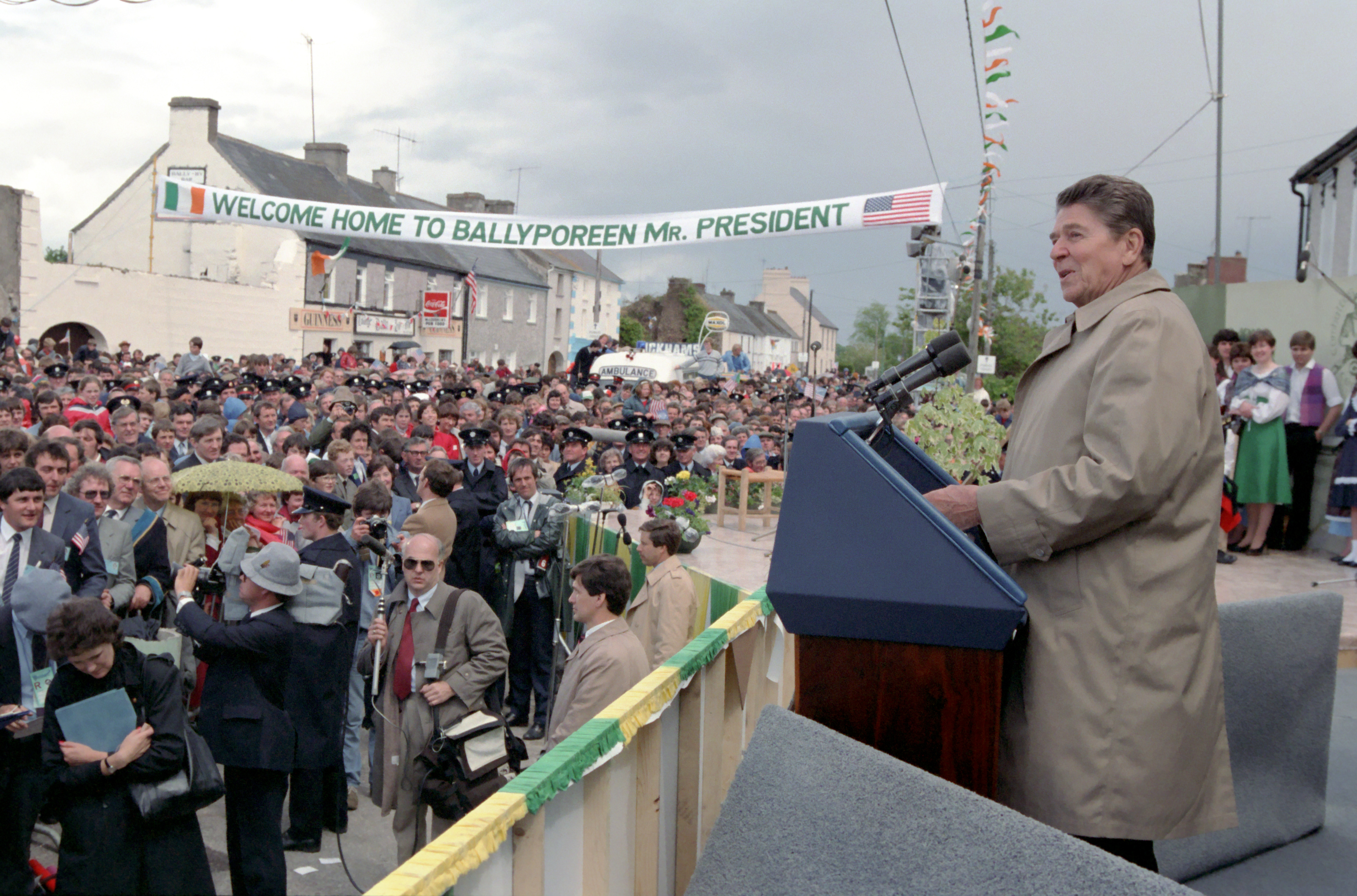
United States President Ronald Reagan speaking to a crowd in his ancestral home in Ballyporeen, Ireland in 1984

- Ronald Reagan (1911–2004) – 40th President of the United States (1981–1989); 33rd Governor of California (1967–1975); father was Irish-American
- Thomas Reilly – Massachusetts Attorney General
- James B. Reynolds – US Congressman
- Daniel J. Riordan – US Congressman
- Richard Riordan – former Los Angeles mayor
- Bernard Shandon Rodey – US Delegate
- William R. Roberts – US Congressman
- John J. Rooney – US Congressman
- William Russell – US Congressman, Ohio State Representative, Ohio State Senator
- Jim Ryan – former Illinois Attorney General; father was Irish, mother was Italian
- Paul Ryan – US Congressman and 2012 Vice Presidential nominee; father was of Irish ancestry
- Tim Ryan – US Congressman
- William Ryan – US Congressman
- Christopher Scanlon – Buffalo mayor
- Mary Gay Scanlon – US Congresswoman from Pennsylvania
- William J. Sewell – US Senator, President of the New Jersey Senate
- Wilson Shannon – Ohio governor
- H. James Shea Jr. – member of the Massachusetts House of Representatives
- William F. Sheehan – Buffalo democratic machine boss
- John Sheridan – New Jersey Transportation Commissioner
- James Shields – US Congressman, Ohio State Representative
- James Shields – US Senator, Commissioner of the General Land Office, Illinois Auditor
- Peter Joseph Shields – Superior Court Judge, Jeffersonian Democrat, for 49 years; founder of University of California at Davis, and the McGeorge Law School; son of John Shields, County Donegal, Ireland and Elizabeth Bowe, County Waterford, Ireland
- Sargent Shriver – Democratic politician
- John Smilie – US Congressman
- Al Smith – New York governor, Democratic Party presidential candidate (Irish born grandparents from Westmeath; Smith identified as an Irish American)
- James Smith – signatory to the Declaration of Independence
- O'Brien Smith – US Congressman, South Carolina Senator, South Carolina Representative
- Alexander Smyth – US Congressman, Virginia State Delegate
- Peter J. Somers – Milwaukee mayor
- Brian P. Stack – Mayor of Union City, New Jersey
- Michael J. Stack – US Congressman
- Christopher D. Sullivan – US Congressman
- James Sullivan – Massachusetts governor
- Patrick Joseph Sullivan – US Senator and Wyoming State Representative
- Timothy Sullivan – US Congressman
- Jane Swift – first woman to serve as Massachusetts governor
- William Howard Taft – 27th President of the United States
- James Tate – first Catholic mayor of Philadelphia
- Thomas Taggart – US Senator, Chair of the Democratic National Committee, 18th Mayor of Indianapolis
- George Taylor – signatory to the Declaration of Independence
- John K. Tener – Pennsylvania governor, US Congressman
- Charles Thomson – secretary to the Continental Congress
- John Thomson – US Congressman, Ohio State Senator, Ohio State Representative
- Matthew Thornton – signatory to the Declaration of Independence
- John F. Tierney – US Congressman
- Maurice J. Tobin – Boston mayor and Massachusetts governor
- Harry S. Truman – 33rd President of the United States
- Joseph Patrick Tumulty – attorney/secretary to Woodrow Wilson
- John V. Tunney – US Senator
- William M. Tweed – Political boss/US Congressman
- Jimmy Walker – New York City mayor
- David I. Walsh – Massachusetts' first Catholic governor
- James T. Walsh – US Congressman
- Marty Walsh – US Secretary of Labor, Boston mayor
- Michael Walsh – US Congressman, New York State Assemblyman
- Patrick Walsh – Mayor of Augusta, Georgia, US Senator, Georgia State Assemblyman
- Thomas W. Ward – Austin mayor
- Thomas J. Whelan – Jersey City mayor
- Campbell P. White – US Congressman
- Woodrow Wilson – 28th President of the United States
- William Whipple – signatory to the Declaration of Independence
- Kevin White – Boston mayor
- Thomas L. Young – Ohio governor, lieutenant governor Ohio, US Congressman, Ohio State Senator, Ohio State Representative
