= Finerty =

Finerty is a surname. Notable people with the surname include:

- Christopher E. Finerty (born c. 1970), United States Air Force general
- Joseph E. Finerty (1905–1992), American politician
- John F. Finerty (1846–1908), American politician
