= What Women Want (disambiguation) =

What Women Want is a 2000 American romantic comedy film.

What Women Want may also refer to:

- What Women Want (1920 film), an American silent film
- What Women Want (2011 film), a Chinese remake of the 2000 film
- What Women Want (Australia), an Australian political organisation
- What Women Want (TV series), a Malaysian reality television programme broadcast from 2006 to 2007
- What Women Want, a radio talk show hosted by Indian actress Kareena Kapoor

== See also ==
- What Men Want (disambiguation)
