= H. James Shea Jr. =

American politician (1939–1970)

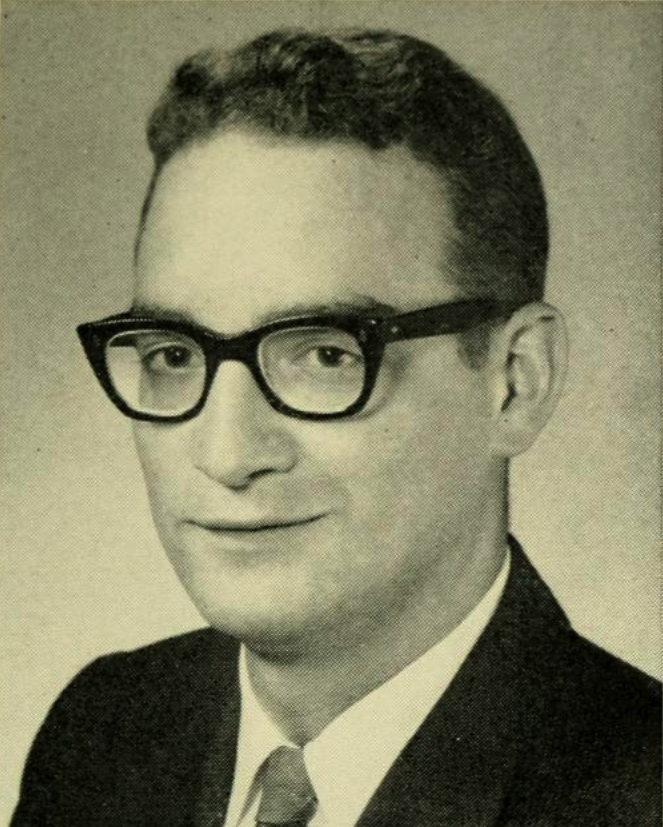
- Portrait of Shea, c. 1969

Member of the Massachusetts House of Representatives from the 12th Middlesex district
- In office January 8, 1969 – May 9, 1970
- Preceded by: Felix Perrault
- Succeeded by: Paul Guzzi

Personal details
- Born: Herman James Shea Jr. December 10, 1939 Boston, Massachusetts, U.S.
- Died: May 9, 1970 (aged 30) Newton, Massachusetts, U.S.
- Resting place: St. Joseph Cemetery
- Party: Democratic
- Spouse: Anita Vesta McDonald (m. 1967)
- Relatives: Dennis J. Shea (grandfather)
- Education: Tufts University (AB)

Herman James "Jim" Shea Jr. (December 10, 1939 – May 9, 1970) was an American politician from the state of Massachusetts. A resident of Newton for most of his life, he graduated from Tufts University and, after dropping out of the University of Virginia School of Law, found employment as a civil engineer, real estate broker, and university instructor. A progressive member of the Democratic Party, he served on the Newton Board of Aldermen as well as in the Massachusetts House of Representatives.

From his election to the House in 1968, freshman legislator Shea engaged in activism against the Vietnam War and supported the burgeoning modern environmental movement. A bill he sponsored, which later bore his name, exempted Massachusetts residents from being conscripted into federal service in undeclared foreign conflicts. While it passed the legislature and was signed into law by Governor Francis Sargent, the Supreme Court declined to hear the state's challenge to the war's constitutionality in Massachusetts v. Laird.

Already feeling overworked soon after he entered the legislature, Shea was frequently asked to speak and floated as a candidate for higher office. Succumbing to what his wife described as "political pressures," he committed suicide by gunshot at the age of 30.

== Early life and family ==
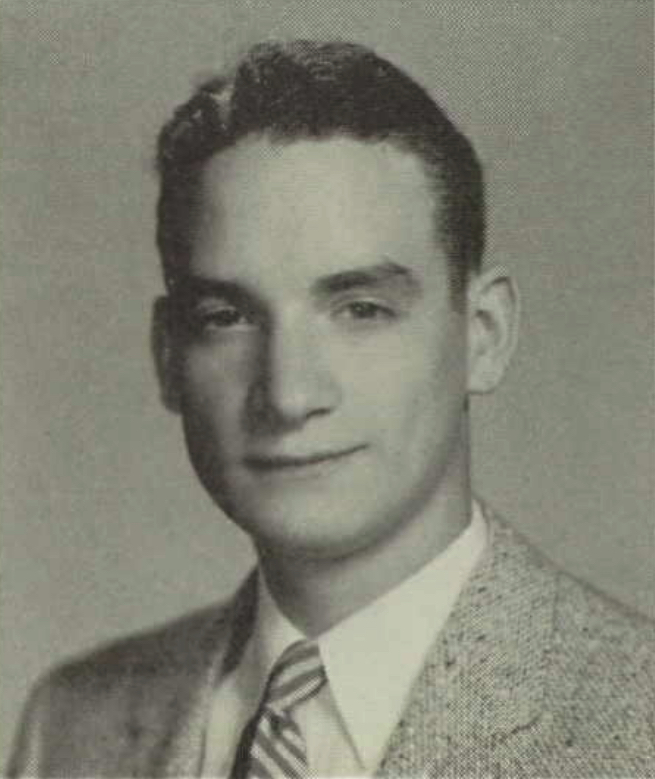
Shea in the 1957 Newton High School yearbook

=== Childhood and education ===
Shea was born on December 10, 1939, in Boston, Massachusetts, the first of three sons of Eileen (née Curtin; 1911–2002) and Herman James Shea Sr. (1911–1998). His father, the son of National Football League treasurer Dennis J. Shea, was a civil engineer and member of the faculty at the Massachusetts Institute of Technology.

He grew up in Newton and attended public schools there, including Newton High School, from which he graduated in 1957. He then went on to Tufts University, where he earned a degree in political science, with a minor in economics; he attended the University of Virginia School of Law, following this, but left after completing 34 credit hours. Before devoting himself to politics full-time, he was employed as civil engineer and real estate broker. He also completed graduate work and served as a teaching assistant in political science at Northeastern University.

=== Marriage ===
In June 1967, Shea married the former Anita Vesta McDonald, an instructor of biology at Salem State College, at Saint Mary's Catholic Church in Plainfield, New Jersey. L. James DeWolfe Jr. served as his best man. The couple settled in Newton after a honeymoon through New England and Canada.

== Political career ==
=== Local politics ===
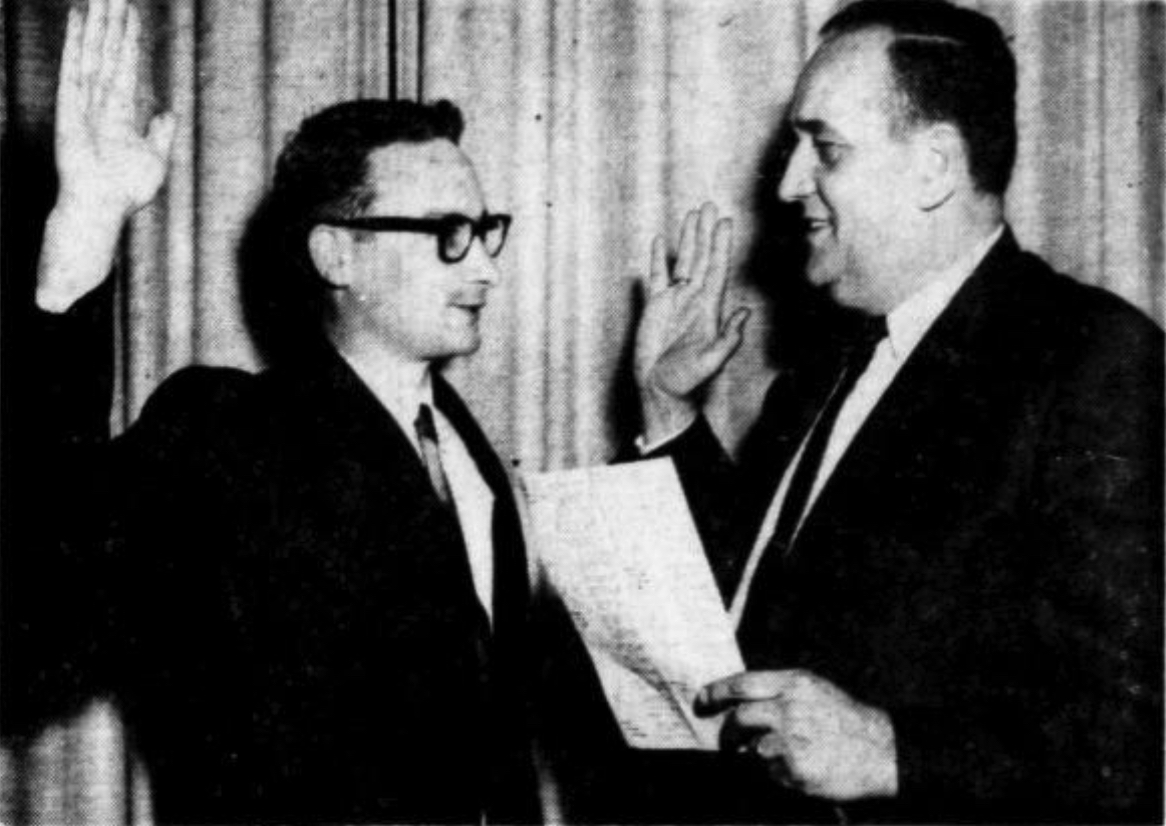
Shea sworn in as alderman by Newton mayor Monte Basbas

Shea first ran for an at-large seat on the Newton Board of Aldermen in 1963. In a race for two spots from Ward 7, he ran on a progressive platform that included providing public records of board attendance and activities. He placed a distant fourth among the candidates.

In November 1965, he ran again, this time for the Ward 7 seat being vacated by incumbent William Carmen, and initially came in 8 votes behind Boston University professor Harry H. Crosby. After a recount, Shea was given 961 votes to Crosby's 958. The battle made its way to the Massachusetts Supreme Judicial Court, which declared Shea the winner the following April, after more than five months of uncertainty.

Two years later, in 1967, Shea ran for reelection unopposed. He compiled a liberal voting record, earning himself a 100% rating – the highest of anyone on the Board of Aldermen – from the Massachusetts chapter of Americans for Democratic Action.

=== State politics and anti-war activism ===
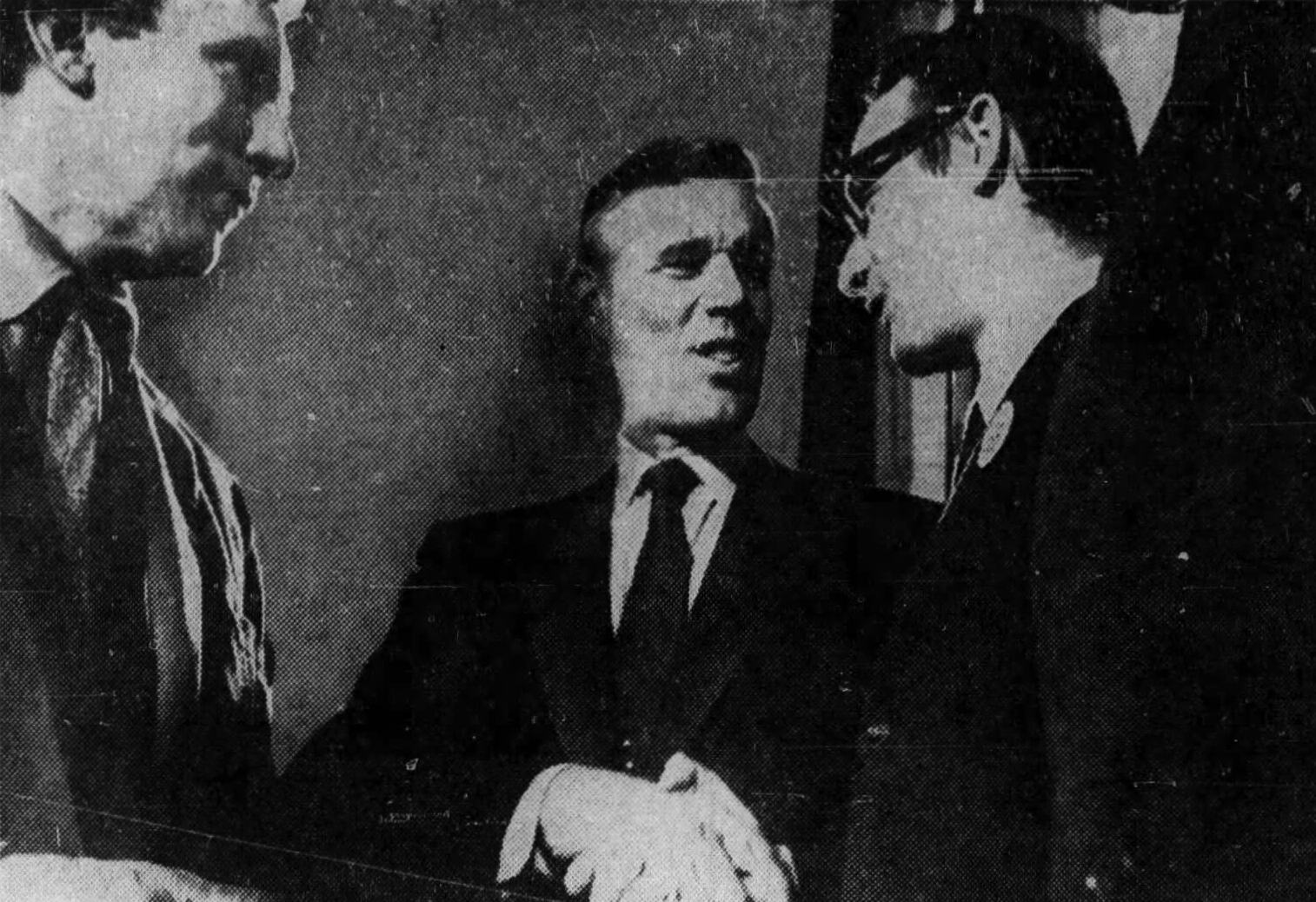
Shea with Professor Steve Worth and Governor Francis Sargent at the Shea Bill's signing ceremony

In 1968, state representative Joseph G. Bradley decided against running for reelection in the newly drawn 12th Middlesex district and instead challenged longtime 3rd district congressman Philip J. Philbin in the September 17 Democratic Party primary. Philbin, the second highest ranking member of the House Armed Services Committee, was perceived as being hawkish on Vietnam, while Bradley, one of the first politicians in the state to oppose the bombing of North Vietnam, aligned himself with the anti-war faction of the party. Shea endorsed Bradley and mounted a campaign to succeed him in the state house. While Bradley was not successful in his race, Shea was. He surprised poll watchers by ending up the top Democratic vote-getter in the district, receiving 277 more votes than Bradley's seatmate, Paul F. Malloy. Malloy and Shea bested Republican nominees Wigmore A. Pierson and Nelson M. Silk Jr. in the November general election.

Shea was opposed to the Vietnam War, and sponsored a bill under which Massachusetts residents could refuse to fight abroad in undeclared wars, (Note: The bill did not allow Massachusetts residents to decline the draft; rather, it provided for them to decline combat duty in foreign countries unless the military action had been authorized by a declaration of war by Congress. The measure also directed the Massachusetts Attorney General to represent such servicemen in court. A test case was being prepared by the state Attorney General shortly after its passage.) thereby setting up a possible constitutional test of the Viet Nam War. The landmark legislation was passed by the legislature and signed into law by the governor. Though it was later overturned by the Supreme Court, Shea's bill had wide-reaching impact at the time, including the passage of the War Powers Act in 1974, which limited the amount of time in which a President could conduct military operations before going to Congress for a declaration of war or other justification.

== Death and funeral ==
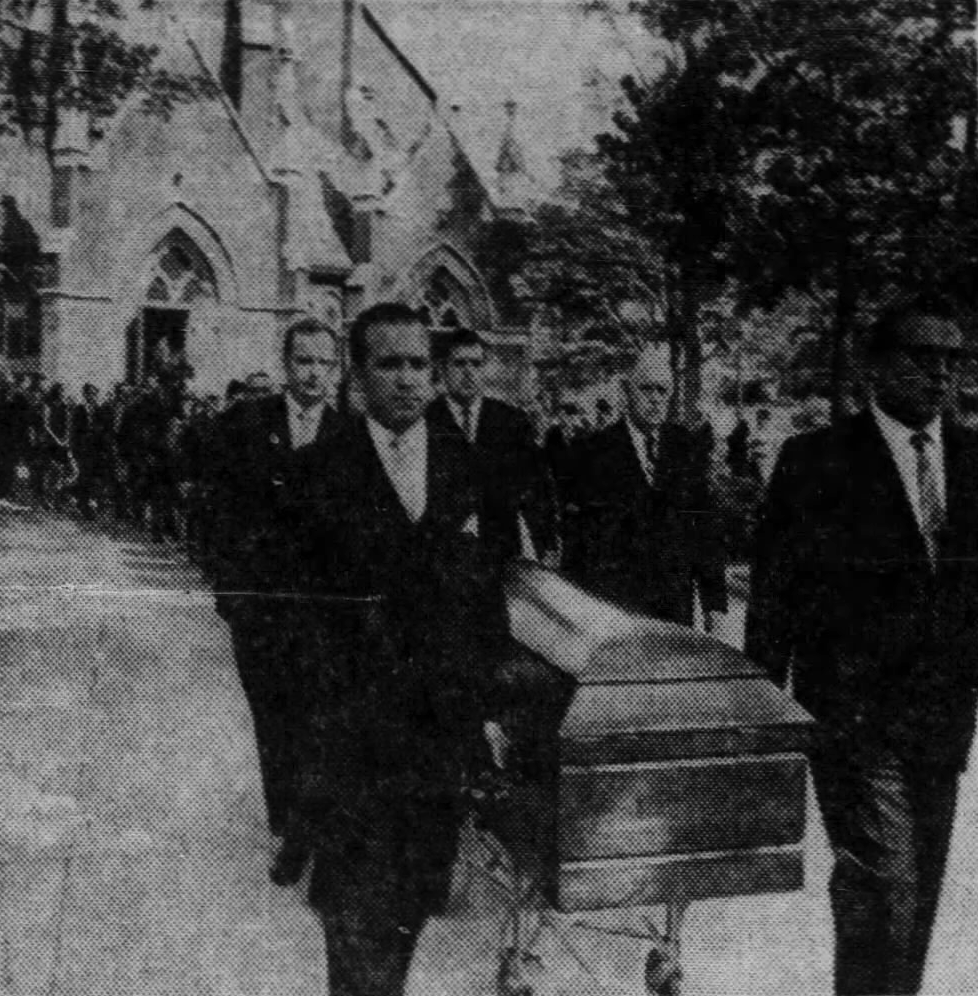

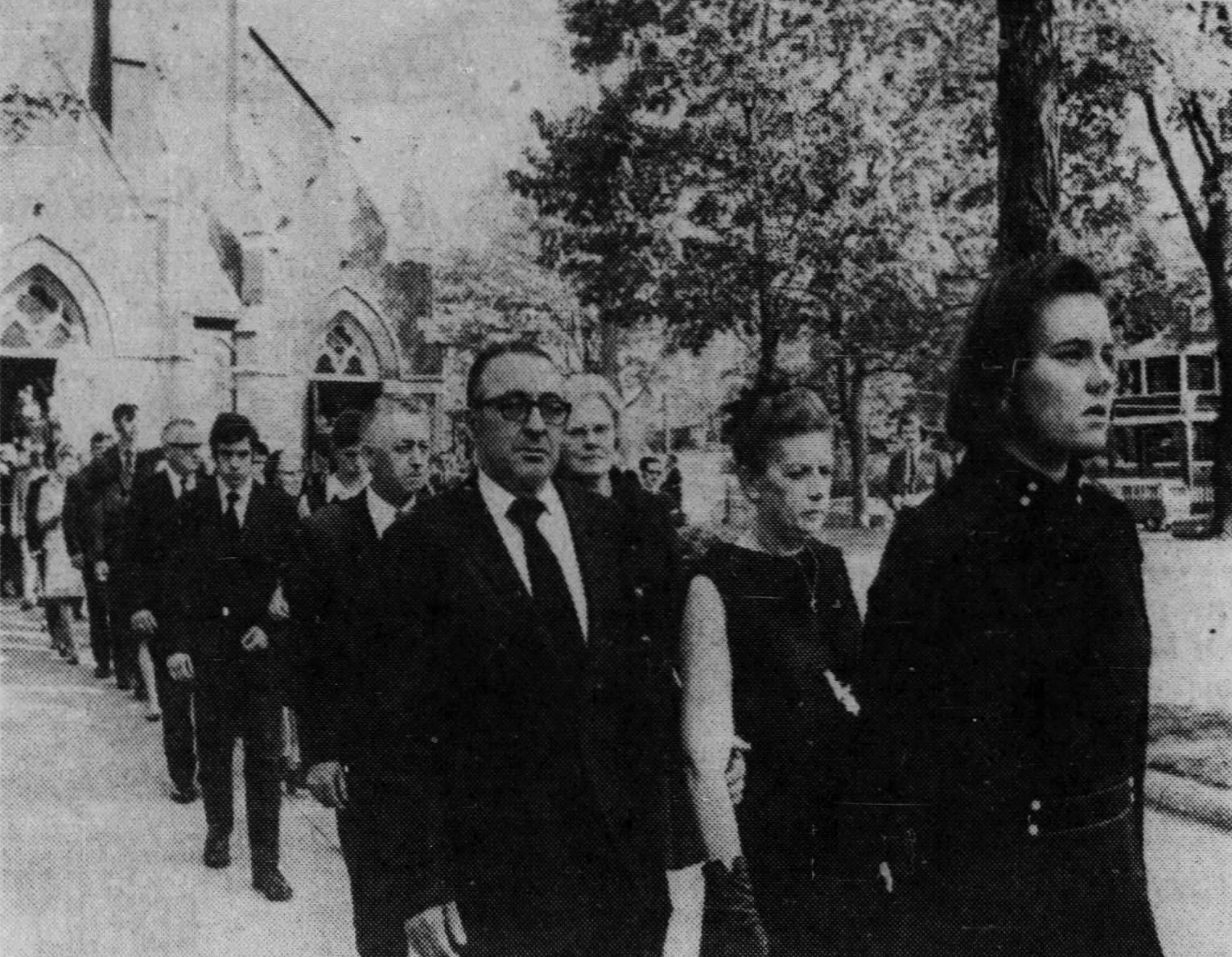
Mourners leave Our Lady Help of Christians Church behind Shea's casket on May 11, 1970

On May 8, 1970, Shea and his wife went to the home of Joseph M. McDonnell, a Newton alderman and friend, where they spent the evening socializing. Upon returning to their residence on Princess Road in West Newton at approximately 12:30 the following morning, Shea went to an upstairs room he used as an office and closed the door. When his wife went to check on him, he raised the .38 caliber Smith & Wesson revolver he owned to his head and fired. He had reportedly been under "political pressure" at the time. After Shea's wife phoned McDonnell, who called the police, Shea was transported to Newton-Wellesley Hospital, where he was declared dead on arrival at 12:55 am.

Following services at Our Lady Help of Christians Church in Newtonville on May 11, Shea was buried in St. Joseph Cemetery in West Roxbury. Attendees at the funeral included U.S. Senator Ted Kennedy, Congressman Philip Philbin, Massachusetts Attorney General Robert H. Quinn, and state treasurer Robert Q. Crane. Senate President Maurice A. Donahue and House Speaker David M. Bartley were among the honorary pallbearers.

== Legacy ==
Businessman Robert Kraft was elected chairman of the Newton City Democratic Committee in 1968. The death of Shea, a friend, deterred Kraft from further pursuing a career in politics, including a 1970 congressional run.

Shea's legislative assistant, John Businger, successfully ran for a seat in the Massachusetts House in 1970 and served until 1999.

== See also ==
- List of American politicians of Irish descent
- List of peace activists
- List of suicides (N–Z)

== Notes ==
Massachusetts House of Representatives
Preceded by Felix Perrault	Massachusetts Representative from the 12th Middlesex District; 1969–1970; Served alongside: Paul F. Malloy	Succeeded by Paul Guzzi
