= What Men Want (disambiguation) =

What Men Want is a 2019 American fantasy comedy film.

What Men Want may also refer to:

== Films ==
- What Men Want (1930 film), an American drama film directed by Ernst Laemmle
- Po čem muži touží (translated as What Men Want), a 2018 Czech comedy film

== Other ==
- What Men Want, a Malaysian TV show and winner of "Best Reality Programme" in the 2012 Asian Television Awards
- What Men Want, a one-man comedy show by Peadar de Burca
- What Men Want, a book of poems by Laura McCullough
- What Men Want: In Bed, a book by Bettina Arndt

== See also ==
- What a Man Wants, a 2018 South Korean film
- What Women Want (disambiguation)
