= Steven Basham =

Steven Basham may refer to:

- Steve Basham (born 1977), English retired footballer
- Steven L. Basham (born 1965), American lieutenant general
