= What Women Want (TV series) =

- Developed by: PhoSumpro; 8TV
- Starring: Hannah Tan
- Country of origin: Malaysia
- Original language: English
- No. of episodes: 12

Production
- Producers: Tan Yin Yin; Joanne Chin
- Running time: 1 hour (per normal episode)

Original release
- Network: 8TV
- Release: 16 December 2006 – 1 March 2007

What Women Want is a Malaysian reality television programme co-produced by 8TV and phoSumpro!, sponsored by Gillette and Head & Shoulders and broadcast on 8TV from 14 December 2006 till 1 March 2007. Hosted by Hannah Tan, it featured 13 young bachelors from within and outside Malaysia vying for the "What Women Want" title and the frills which come with it.

== Format ==
In each as well. Both these contestants need to face an all-female panel of four judges, i.e. three normal women and a celebrity, which will decide their fate; either one of them, both or neither would get cut.

After facing the panel, the "bottom two" pack up to prepare to leave and wait in a special area in the hotel while the judges perform their most important duty. After that, the judges would convey their results to Hannah Tan which in turn would announce the results to the bottom two.

At the end of broadcast of each episode, there is a clip featuring Hannah giving her "Male Grooming Tips" while the credits roll.

== Season 1 ==
**What Women Want Contestants** (each with his episode of elimination and its original broadcast date)
**Season 1**
Mohd Hafiz bin Adnan	"What Women Want"
Charles Brunold	Runner-Up
Hisham Hamzah	Ep 10 (15 February)
Christian Neal Capes	Ep 9 (8 February)
Nicholl Eruthiaraj	Ep 8 (1 February)
Talha Jamshaid	Ep 8 (1 February)
Andrew Ting Lin	Ep 6 (18 January)
Adzrool Idzwan Ismail	Ep 5 (11 January)
Ram Gopal Raj	Ep 4 (4 January)
Aloysius Wee	Ep 3 (28 December)
Carliff Ridzwan bin Carleel	Ep 3 (28 December)
Adrian Jalaludin	Ep 2 (21 December)
Jasvinder Singh Gill	Ep 1 (14 December)

=== Contestants ===
The following details of the contestants were correct as of the beginning of the competition.

- **Mohd Hafiz bin Adnan** — a junior hairstylist from Kedah
- **Charles Brunold** — an expatriate businessman from France
- **Hisham Hamzah** (**Sham**) — a radio announcer for local station Mix FM
- **Christian Neal Capes** — an English language and literature lecturer
- **Nicholl Eruthiaraj** — a food sciences student and Malaysian Idol alumnus from Bukit Mertajam, Penang
- **Talha Jamshaid** — a Pakistani traveller who was born in Argentina, and claimed Kathmandu, Nepal and Ankara, Turkey to be his former home towns
- **Andrew Ting Lin** — an advertising company employee from the United States
- **Adzrool Idzwan Ismail** (**Tom**) — a university student in communication course
- **Ram Gopal Raj**
- **Aloysius Wee** (**Alloy**) — an events manager
- **Carliff Ridzwan bin Carleel** — a business degree holder
- **Adrian Jalaluddin** — a historical studies degree holder
- **Jasvinder Singh Gill** — a university student

=== Jury ===
==== Permanent ====
The permanent members of the jury consists of three Malaysian women:

- Nadia Shareef Ang
- Nivi Nagapan
- Marina Suwendy

==== Guest Jury ====
- Chelsia Ng (Ep 1)
- Bernie Chan (Ep 2)
- Xandria Ooi (Ep 3)
- Daphne Iking (Ep 4)
- Joanna Bessey (Ep 5)
- Elaine Daly (Ep 6)
- Sarimah Ibrahim (Ep 7)
- Aishah Sinclair (Ep 8)
- Joanne Kam (Ep 9)
- Carmen Soo (Ep 10)

=== Crew ===
==== Production Team ====
- Mai Fernandez - Director
- Tan Yin Yin - Producer / Co-director
- Joanna Chan - Producer
- Shahida Azad Jamaludin - Assistant Producer
- Wong Yew Cheun- Production Assistant
- Koh Xin Yi- Production Assistant
- Ellis Juglie - Stylist
- Naomi Lim - Stylist
- Kelly Ang - Casting & PR
- Lim Peak Leong - Handyman

==== Technical Team ====
- Wong Tak Fung - Camera
- Steven En - Camera
- John Goh - Camera
- Andy Henry - Camera
- Tan Jer Reen - Camera
- Chia Tyzz Liang - Camera
- Ahmad Tajuddin b. Tahir - Sound
- Emran b. Taib - Sound
- Azlan Radzif b. Mohd Yusoff - Sound
- Loh Yew Meng - Lights
- Chin Poh Yen - Lights
- Choo Kum Foo - Lights
- Lee Kim Yaw - Lights

==== Post Production Team ====
- MNG F - Supervisor
- Janell - Online Editor
- [J] - Online Editor
- Syndie - Offline Editor
- Anya - Offline Editor
- Snowball - Music & Effects
- Chan - Colorist

=== Episode list ===
For the Elimination entry there are more than one name i.e. the contestants which were named to face elimination in each episode for performing poorly in the Elimination challenge or voted out by others; the name in bold is the one sent off, while the others were safe.

Episode 1 (aired 14 December 2006)

13 bachelors were selected from 400 after an audition. Throughout the competition they stayed in Berjaya Times Square Hotel & Convention Centre. They first got involved in the filming of the music video for Hannah Tan's Fly on the Wall. Besides this, they were required to undergo an interview by the judges in which they attempt to give a good impression of themselves in front of the panel. Jasvin could not attend due to an exam which clashed with the time of the interview, thus making him the first contestant to be sent off after hearing from the panel in the fountain park of the hotel.

Episode 2 (aired 21 December 2006)

Rewards challenge: Military-style challenge
This was held in a camp near Gombak.

- Winner: Sham
- Reward: Movie in IMAX Times Square
- Shared with: Nicholl

Elimination challenge: Paintball. The bachelors were split into two teams and each needed to fight a third team made up of women. Both teams lost.

- Winner: —
- Elimination: **Adrian**, Andrew, Hafiz, Carliff

Episode 3 (aired 28 December 2006)

Rewards challenge: IQ test
Hannah Tan asked a set of general knowledge questions to each contestant.

- Winner: Ram
- Reward: Tailor-made suit
- Shared with: Carliff

Elimination challenge: Advertising
This the Apprentice-styled challenge saw two teams competing for approval from the management of P&G Malaysia by presenting ideas to promote Gillette and Head & Shoulders respectively.

- Winner: Team Gillette
- Elimination: **Alloy**, **Carliff**, Sham

Episode 4 (aired 4 January 2007)

Rewards challenge: Rock climbing
The contestant who climbed in the fastest time won

- Winner: Hafiz
- Reward: Helicopter ride with Daphne Iking
- Shared with: Christian

Elimination challenge: City race
This The Amazing Race-styled challenge saw three teams of three race through a track in Stadium Kampung Pandan, the bungee jump, flying fox, and G-force challenge near KL Tower, and swimming in the hotel pool at Times Square. Ram appeared to be bad at swimming.

- Winner: Team Hafiz, Nicholl and Charles
- Elimination: **Ram** and Andrew

Episode 5 (aired 11 January 2007)

Rewards challenge: Jewellery search
The bachelors were brought to Habib Jewels Jalan Ampang to help a model find a suitable set of jewels for her.

- Winner: Hafiz
- Reward: A pair of cuffling
- Shared with: Nicholl

Elimination challenge: Salsa
Each bachelor paired up with a woman in the salsa challenge which was judged by a dance critic.

- Winner: Christian
- Elimination: Charles and **Tom**

In the elimination session, Charles tried to win the hearts of the judges by singing a Malay-English song with the catchphrase "Tahu tak pe" (guess what?)

Episode 6 (aired 18 January 2007)

Rewards challenge: Salesman
The bachelors were split into two teams, each trying to outsell each other with Gilette and Head & Shoulder products in two different pharmacies.

- Winner: Team Gillette (Nicholl as team leader wins reward)
- Reward: Dinner with Hannah Tan in Restoran Lafite, Shangri-La Hotel
- Shared with: Talha

Elimination challenge: Culinary
In Restoran Lafite, contestants were split into four pairs to prepare the best dishes. Nicholl as rewards winner was paired with a sous chef. Their work was evaluated by a panel of food critics.

- Winner: Christian and Hafiz
- Elimination: Talha and **Andrew**

In one confession scene of this episode after the Rewards challenge, Andrew complained about consumer habits in Malaysia. Later in the elimination session, the same contestant received negative feedback from the panel and other contestants.

Episode 7 (aired 25 January 2007)

Rewards challenge: Kayak
The men were brought to Lake Putrajaya to compete amongst themselves in this 450m-long race.

- Winner: Charles
- Reward: Massage and spa at Times Square
- Shared with: Talha

Elimination challenge: Jungle endurance
In Asian Overland Boot Camp, the men were outfitted only in sarong and barefooted in this four-part race (carrying a partner across the river, navigating in the forest, climbing down a wartime vertical tunnel, racing along the river to the finish line).

- Winner: Talha
- Elimination: Christian and Sham

Christian was exempted from the barefoot requirement due to injuries in his feet. Then he found himself lost in the jungle for over five hours after the rest finished their race, before being found at dusk. Christian and Sham were safe from the elimination after the panel were moved by their ordeal in the Elimination challenge.

Episode 8 (aired 1 February 2007)

Rewards challenge: Foot reflexology
The bachelors massaged the feet of six blindfolded women who later determined the winner.

- Winner: Hafiz
- Reward: Dinner with Monica Pang ni No Black Tie
- Shared with: Sham

Elimination challenge: Serenade
The men were brought to Colmar Tropicale, Bukit Tinggi for the challenge of winning Aishah Sinclair's heart by singing, poetry or verbal expression. Those who managed to do so were given a rose from Aishah, and those who did otherwise they were splashed on with a pail of water.

- Winner: Charles
- Elimination: **Nicholl** and **Talha**

Episode 9 (aired 8 February 2007)

Rewards challenge: Test-driving
The men learned to navigate a Lotus Elise on an autocross track. The one who took down the fastest aggregate time after two rounds won.

- Winner: Charles
- Reward: Pillion-riding with a gang of women bikers, dinner and date with them at Starbucks Times Square
- Shared with: Hafiz

Elimination challenge: Boxing
The four men underwent two rounds of boxing each. While the winners of round one move to the final, the losers took on each other in a play-off, in which the loser faces elimination.

- Winner: Charles
- Elimination: **Christian** and Hafiz

Despite moving to the finals, Hafiz showed his unwillingness to keep fighting. This resulted in him being voted out.

Episode 10 (aired 15 February 2007)

Rewards challenge: Fashion
Each contestant searched and bought a set of sports attire and a set of casual for each of three models in Tines Square, without asking the models first.

- Winner: Charles
- Reward: Fashion shopping, Styling
- Shared with: Sham

Elimination challenge: Photography
The three men attempted to present themselves stylishly for a photographer for Oxygen who would later evaluate them alongside the magazine's chief editor.

- Winner: Charles
- Elimination: Hafiz and **Sham**

Thus far, Charles had won five consecutive challenges.

Episode 11 (aired 22 February 2007)

With Hafiz and Charles left fending against each other for the title of "What Women Want", a lay woman was chosen to be part of their final challenge after winning a corresponding contest. The bachelors were taken to Pulau Tioman where each attempt to win the woman's heart in one day. Sebelum itu, Hafiz and Charles were made to take a memory test by Hannah Tan about all of the contestants of What Women Want throughout the competition and the winner would choose which day to spend his time with the woman. Hafiz won the task and took day two.

On "day one", Charles met Daphne Lourdes and they began their date with a donkey ride at the beach side (as a result of losing the quiz), followed by cycling on a golf course. Although both activities went "smoothly", it was the romantic dinner time in which Charles lost Daphne's satisfaction. The next day, it was Hafiz's turn to meet Daphne and their date started with a ship ride around the island, followed by kayaking, diving, and picnic and kite-flying. Daphne seemed happier with Hafiz compared to Charles.

Episode 12 (aired 1 March 2007)

In this season finalé, Mohd Hafiz Bin Adnan defeated Charles Brunold to grab the title of "What Women Want".

== Trivia ==
- Mawi appeared in the opening clip of episodes 8, 9 and 10, in which he asked questions about women's needs.
- Charles, Ram, Christian, Sham, Hafiz, and Adrian since joined CLEO's 50 Most Eligible Bachelors 2007. Christian won the biggest title of "Most Eligible Bachelor of the Year", while Hafiz took the "Bachelor With The Sexiest Shag" title.
