= Dennis J. Shea =

American football executive (1876–1958)

Personal information
- Born: September 18, 1876; Concord, Massachusetts, U.S.
- Died: February 7, 1958 (aged 81); West Newton, Massachusetts, U.S.

Career history
- Boston Braves (1932) Publicity director; Boston Redskins (1933–1936) General manager; Brooklyn Dodgers (1938–1940) Business manager; National Football League (1940–1955) Treasurer

Dennis Joseph Shea (September 18, 1876 – February 7, 1958) was an American professional football executive who was the manager of the Boston Redskins and Brooklyn Dodgers of the National Football League (NFL). He later served as NFL treasurer from 1940 to 1955.

== Theatre ==
Shea got his start in the theatre business in 1900 as a program boy at the Colonial Theatre. By 1925 he was the manager of the Park Theatre. The following year he became the press representative for A. L. Erlanger's Boston theatres (the Colonial Theatre, Hollis Street Theatre, and Tremont Theatre).

== National Football League ==
In 1932, Shea became the publicity director of the expansion Boston Braves of the National Football League. He became business manager of the team (now known as the Boston Redskins) the following year. Shea remained with the Redskins until February 10, 1937, when he chose to resign rather than follow the team to Washington, D.C.

On July 18, 1938, Brooklyn Dodgers president Dan Topping announced that Shea would become the team's new business manager. On April 14, 1940, Shea was elected vice president and treasurer of the National Football League. He resigned from the Dodgers on January 10, 1941, in order to focus on his responsibilities as league treasurer. He was reelected treasurer in 1941 and presided over the meeting that elected Elmer Layden as the league's first commissioner. Shea was also given the responsibility to act as commissioner in Layden's absence.

== Later life ==
Shea retired as treasurer in 1955 and spent his final days in a nursing home in West Newton, Massachusetts. He died on February 7, 1958, at the age of 81. He was survived by his wife, Clara and their two sons, Francis and Herman. Herman was the father of state representative H. James Shea Jr.

Sporting positions
Preceded by Carl Storck	National Football League treasurer 1940–1955	Succeeded by Austin Gunsel
