= Steven L. Basham =

United States Air Force general

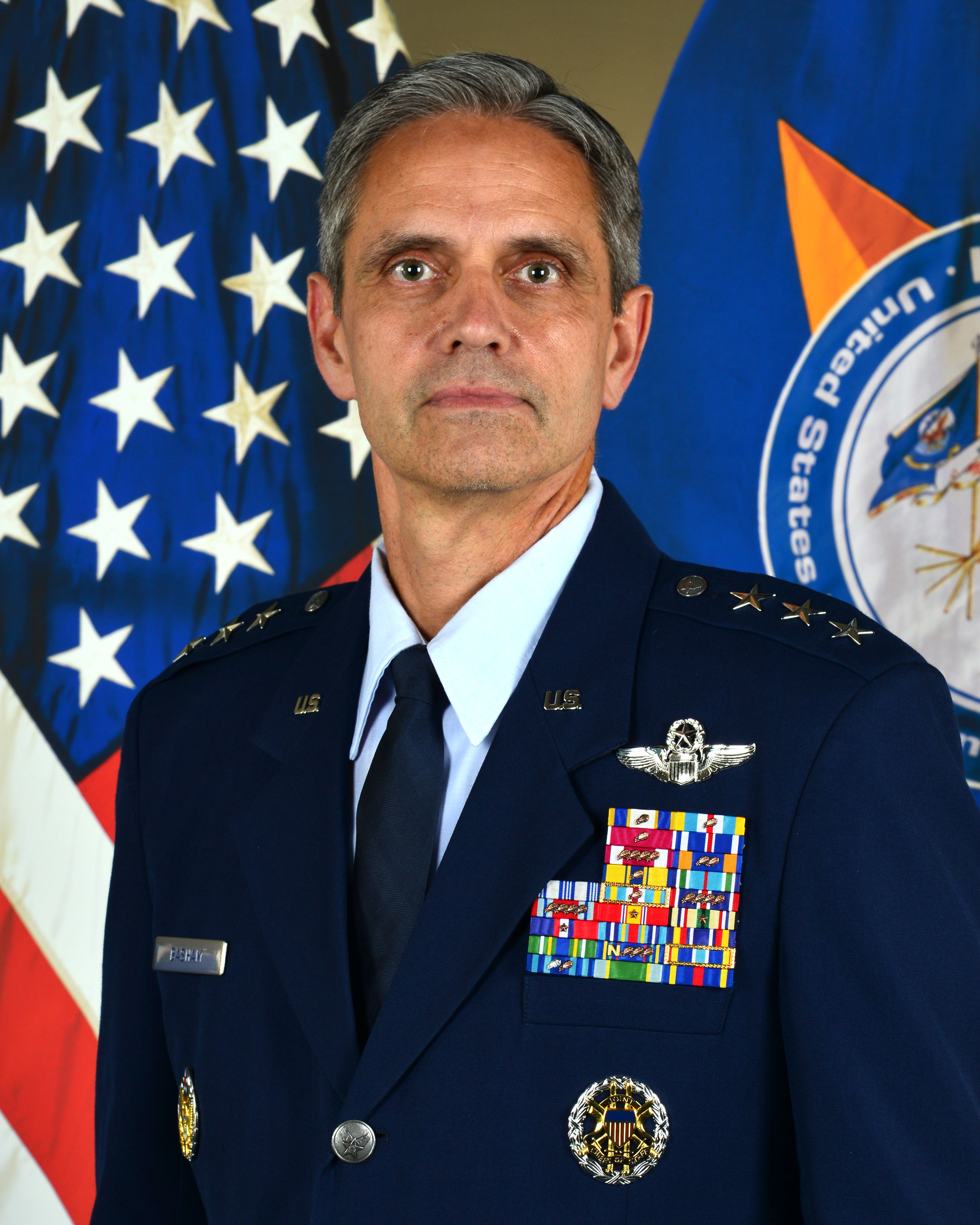
- Official portrait, 2022
- Born: 1965 (age 60–61); Bowling Green, Kentucky, US
- Military career
- Allegiance: United States
- Branch: United States Air Force
- Service years: 1989–2024
- Rank: Lieutenant general
- Commands: 2nd Bomb Wing; 393rd Bomb Squadron
- Awards: Air Force Distinguished Service Medal; Defense Superior Service Medal (2); Legion of Merit (2); Distinguished Flying Cross

Steven L. Basham (born 1965) is a retired United States Air Force lieutenant general who last served as the deputy commander of the United States European Command from 2022 to 2024. He previously served as deputy commander of United States Air Forces in Europe – Air Forces Africa from 2019 to 2022.

Born and raised in Bowling Green, Kentucky, Basham was commissioned through Officer Training School in 1989. He has completed numerous flying, staff and command assignments and is a command pilot with more than 3,400 flying hours in the B-1, B-2 and B-52.

In April 2022, Basham was nominated for assignment as deputy commander of the United States European Command.

== Awards and decorations ==
US Air Force Command Pilot Badge
Joint Chiefs of Staff Identification Badge
Headquarters Air Force Badge

Air Force Distinguished Service Medal
Defense Superior Service Medal with one bronze oak leaf cluster
Legion of Merit with oak leaf cluster
Distinguished Flying Cross
Meritorious Service Medal with four oak leaf clusters
Air Medal with two oak leaf clusters
Air Force Commendation Medal with oak leaf cluster
Joint Service Achievement Medal
Air Force Achievement Medal
Joint Meritorious Unit Award with oak leaf cluster
Air Force Outstanding Unit Award with four oak leaf clusters
Combat Readiness Medal with four oak leaf clusters
National Defense Service Medal with one bronze service star
Southwest Asia Service Medal with service star
Kosovo Campaign Medal with service star
Global War on Terrorism Expeditionary Medal
Global War on Terrorism Service Medal
Korea Defense Service Medal
Nuclear Deterrence Operations Service Medal with "N" Device and three oak leaf clusters
Air Force Expeditionary Service Ribbon with gold frame
Air Force Longevity Service Award with one silver and two bronze oak leaf clusters
Small Arms Expert Marksmanship Ribbon
Air Force Training Ribbon

== Effective dates of promotions ==
Rank	Date
Second lieutenant	January 27, 1989
First lieutenant	January 27, 1991
Captain	January 27, 1993
Major	July 1, 1999
Lieutenant colonel	March 1, 2002
Colonel	August 1, 2007
Brigadier general	August 2, 2013
Major general	July 3, 2017
Lieutenant general	May 1, 2019

Military offices
Preceded by Robert E. Wheeler	Commander of the 2nd Bomb Wing; 2009–2010	Succeeded by Timothy G. Fay
Preceded by ???	Director of Strategy, Plans and Programs of the Pacific Air Forces; 2013–2015	Succeeded by Gregory M. Guillot
Preceded by Joseph T. Guastella	Deputy Director of Requirements of the Joint Staff; 2015–2016	Succeeded by David A. Krumm
Preceded by Thomas W. Bergeson	Legislative Liaison of the United States Air Force; 2016–2019	Succeeded by Christopher E. Finerty
Preceded by Jeffrey L. Harrigian	Deputy Commander of the United States Air Forces in Europe – Air Forces Africa; 2019–2022	Succeeded by John Lamontagne
Preceded by Michael L. Howard	Deputy Commander of the United States European Command; 2022–2024	Succeeded by Robert C. Fulford
