= Matha Óg Ó Maoil Tuile =

17th-century Irish secretary

Matha Óg Ó Maoil Tuile (a.k.a. Matthew Tullie) was secretary to Rudhraighe Ó Domhnaill, 1st Earl of Tyrconnell and Hugh Ó Neill, 2nd Earl of Tyrone.

Ó Maoil Tuile is described as a learned man and a native of Connacht (2007, p. 429). He travelled to Spain with Hugh Roe Ó Donnell in 1602, receiving a pension of twenty-five crowns a month from Philip III of Spain. He was with Hugh Roe shortly before his death. Upon his return to Ireland he became secretary to Hugh Ó Neill, 2nd Earl of Tyrone. Via England, he returned to Spain in 1605.

He was instrumental in the departure of the Ulster lords - Ó Néill, Ó Domhnaill, Mag Uidir - arriving by ship at Rathmullen, county Donegal, on 4 September 1607. It was on this ship that the chiefs and their followers (a total of ninety-five people) left Ireland.

When the group reached Rouen, Ó Maoil Tuile travelled to Paris to appraise Henry IV of France of their arrival. Tadhg Ó Cianáin, a fellow-member of the group, wrote that:

Matha Ó Maoil Tuile went post-haste to Paris. The governor's messenger reached the king of France sooner than Matha [and] got a reply. He returned. The king was returning from hunting [when] Matha went into his presence. He spoke face to face with him [and] told him all the lord's circumstances, [and] how a kind of prohibition had been made against them from traversing the kingdom of France until the king's authority should reach them. The king said respectfully and kindly that he had received letters concerning the gentlemen before that, and that he had written to the governor about them. Matha went to meet the king's secretary. That man said that no harm at all would come to the princes because of their detention, and that a friendly answer from the king would reach them before Matha's return. (2007, p. 67)

He then travelled to Flanders where he contacted Ó Néill's son, Colonel Éinrí Ó Néill, telling him the group were going in that direction:

When Matha Óg came to Rouen, and when he received confirmation that the order and direction they had received was to go to Flanders first, and not directly to Spain until they [first] reached Flanders, he himself went post-haste to Flanders to tell Ó Néill's son, the colonel of the Irish in Flanders under the king of Spain's power, that these lords had come from Ireland, that they had trouble and lost their way at sea, that they had come to land in the kingdom of France, that they were there hindered and not allowed to take the short[est] journey to Spain, because they were obliged to make straight for Flanders, that they were asking the colonel to come to meet them on the border of France, [and] also to procure for them a passport and warrant from the archduke just as the king of France's warrant was [in effect] to the border of his own kingdom.

In Milan he composed a list of those of the party that remained in Flanders. He spent some years between 1608 and 1610 in the Spanish navy, but in the latter year was in Madrid.
