= Peter Joseph Shields =

American judge and founder of UC Davis (1862–1962)

Judge of the Superior Court of Sacramento County
- In office 1900–1949

Personal details
- Born: April 4, 1862 Hangtown Crossing, California, U.S.
- Died: September 28, 1962 (aged 100) Sacramento, California, U.S.
- Party: Democratic
- Spouse: Carolee Wiltsie
- Known for: Writing the legislation that established the University Farm, now the University of California, Davis

Peter Joseph Shields (April 4, 1862 – September 28, 1962) was an American judge who served on the Superior Court of Sacramento County, California, from 1900 to 1949. He wrote the 1905 legislation that led to the establishment of the University Farm, which became the University of California, Davis, and is commonly described as one of the campus's founders.

== Early life ==
Shields was born on April 4, 1862, on his family's homestead at Hangtown Crossing, a farming settlement near Sacramento within what is now Rancho Cordova, California. His father, John Shields, had emigrated from County Donegal, Ireland, in 1850, and his mother, Elizabeth (née Bowe), from Waterford, Ireland, in 1855. Both had survived the Great Famine and both crossed the Isthmus of Panama on foot to reach San Francisco, and later Sacramento.

His father had taken part in the California Gold Rush and used the proceeds to buy the undeveloped property that became the Shields Ranch. Shields was the third child, and was named after his mother's first husband, who had died of cholera during the voyage from Panama to San Francisco. His boyhood on the farm gave him a lifelong interest in agriculture.

== Career ==
At the age of 17, Shields graduated from Christian Brothers College in Sacramento and then read law in the office of Judge Amos Catlin. From 1896 to 1898 he worked for the secretary of the California Code Commission and as a secretary in the office of Governor James Budd. In 1899 he was secretary of the State Agricultural Society, and around 1900 he had an informal law partnership with Hiram W. Johnson, later governor of California and a United States senator.

In 1900, at the age of 38, Shields was elected a judge of the Superior Court of Sacramento County. He served until his retirement in 1949, longer than any other superior court judge in California at that time. He sought appointment as a United States district judge in 1913, but was not selected.

Shields raised a well-known herd of Jersey cattle, which were widely exhibited and won many prizes. Until several years before his death, and well into his nineties, he attended the California State Fair judging ring on Jersey Day. He was also active in the Boy Scout movement in the region and was an early president of the Golden Empire Council. He was involved in the founding of the McGeorge School of Law in Sacramento.

Shields wrote an annual birthday message in the Sacramento Bee reflecting on the issues of the day.

== University Farm ==
As secretary of the State Agricultural Society, Shields came to believe that California needed a research campus to improve the state's farming practices, having found that other states were ahead of California in agricultural science. In 1905 he wrote the bill providing for the purchase of a university farm; it was signed into law by Governor George Pardee on March 18, 1905, and appropriated $150,000 for the site. More than 70 communities competed for the farm, and it was over a year before the commission established by the act selected the town then known as Davisville. The first students arrived in 1908–09. Shields also campaigned for funding and took part in selecting the site.

Writing in The Davis Enterprise in 2012, the columnist Rich Rifkin argued that Shields's actual role in establishing the campus was modest: he was not a legislator, the 1905 bill was drafted on behalf of the cattlemen's lobby, and the idea of a Californian school of agriculture had been proposed before. Rifkin suggested that Shields's long life, and his presence at the campus's anniversary celebrations, secured him a reputation as its founder.

Shields maintained his association with the campus until his death. A Peter J. Shields scholarship fund was established in 1939, and in 1955 the university awarded him an honorary LLD. An oak grove in the campus arboretum was dedicated to him at the Charter Day celebration on April 5, 1962, which coincided with his hundredth birthday. In 1972 the main campus library was named the Peter J. Shields Library in his memory, and Peter J. Shields Avenue, the street to its north, also bears his name.

== Politics ==
Shields was a Democrat and a supporter of Congressman John E. Moss and of Edmund G. "Pat" Brown, serving in honorary capacities in Brown's campaigns for attorney general and for governor.

== Personal life ==
Shields married Carolee Wiltsie of Sacramento on August 1, 1901. (Note: The Online Archive of California finding aid gives her surname as "Wilsey".) The couple had one child, who did not survive infancy. Shields died on September 28, 1962, at the age of 100.
