= Hannah Tan =

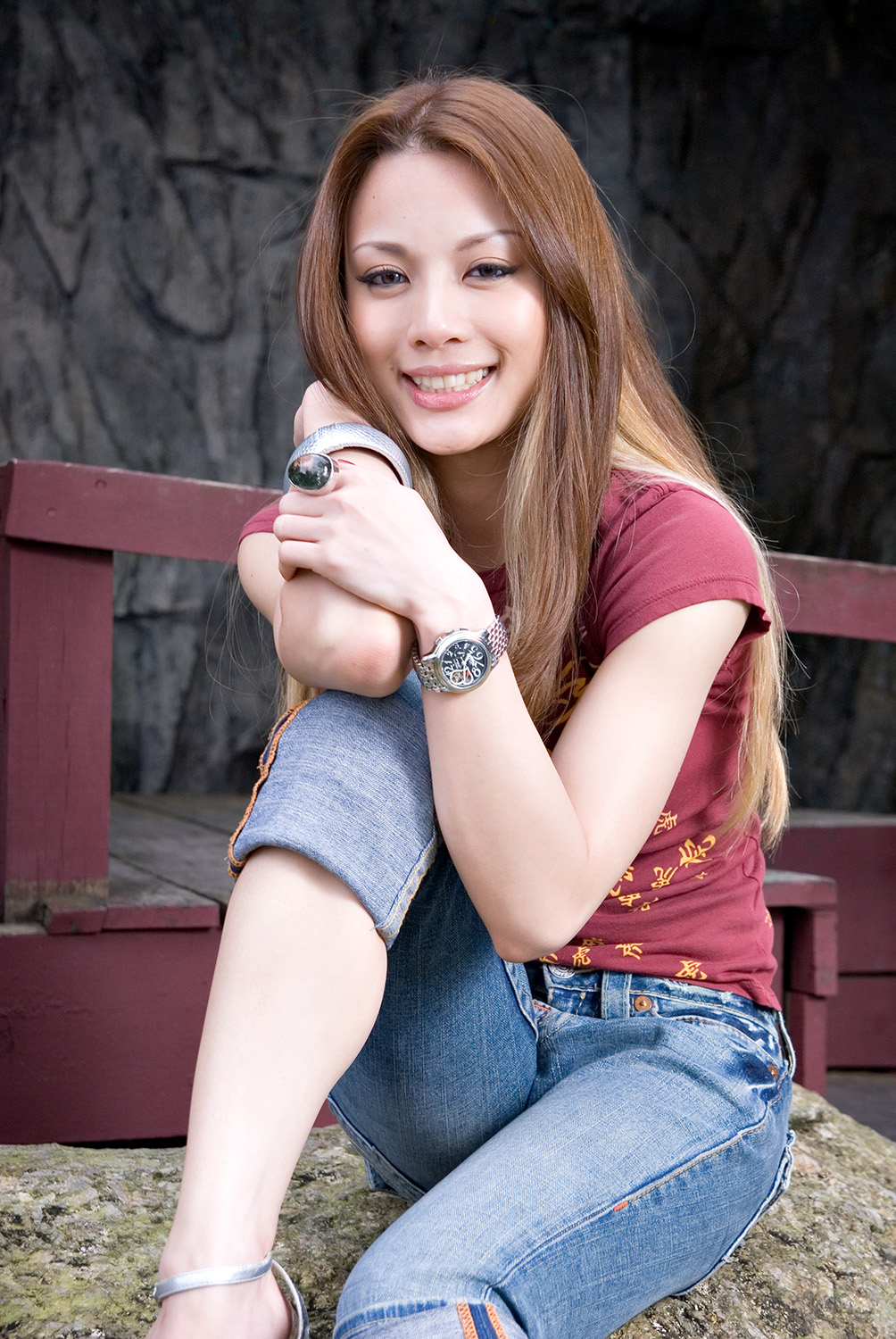

Background information
- Also known as: Hannah T, Hannah Sarah Tan
- Born: October 25, 1981 (age 44); Penang, Malaysia
- Genres: Pop
- Occupations: Singer, television personality
- Years active: 2001–present
- Website: hannahtan.com

Hannah Tan (born October 25, 1981, in Penang), also known as Hannah T or Hannah Sarah Tan, is a Malaysian singer and television personality. She is half-Chinese and half-Kelabit.

== Music career ==
On Tan's debut music album, Crossing Bridges, she collaborated with composers/writers Jorgen Elofsson, Phil Thornalley, Andrew Fromm and Chris Rojas. The album also contained three songs Tan personally wrote and composed. In 2007, she appeared on the Live Earth stage at Live and Loud KL 2007 before acts such as Elliott Yamin, Shaggy and Whitney Houston.

Her Malaysian single "Angel" was the first from a new album to be released at the end of 2010.

In October 2009 she became the first Malaysian to venture into the commercial Japanese entertainment scene with the signing of a multimillion-dollar recording contract with Tokyo-based Fillmore Far East Inc group. Her 2-year contract was to see the release of a Japanese debut Single in August 2010.

== Acting career ==
In January 2008, she made her debut in the Malay entertainment scene by playing the lead role in the Malay tele-movie Bezanya Cinta.

Hannah was invited in October 2008 by film director Afdlin Shauki to play the lead female role as an undercover INTERPOL agent in his My Spy.

== Honors and charity work ==
At the same time, her 2009 I’ll Be Home For Christmas Christmas saw the largest gift collection in a day for the underprivileged children in local orphanages around the Klang Valley, totaling up to more than 650 gifts worth over RM15,000. For the concert, Hannah invited friends from the industry to perform and be part of the community service event.

Sony Pictures appointed Hannah as the first ambassador for Animax Asia in November 2007.
