= Bríd Uí Murchú =

- Occupation: Writer

Bríd Uí Murchú, Irish writer, fl. 1954.

Bríd Bean Uí Murchú was a native of Casla, Connemara, Ireland, She graduated from University College, Galway, with an M.A. in education. Her professional life was spent in the Galway region.

== Bibliography ==
- Oideachas in Iar Connacht sa naoú céad déag, Dublin, 1954.
