= Tom Senier =

Irish-American band leader

Tom Senier (born Galway, Ireland 1895 – 1977 Boston) was an Irish melodeon (single row diatonic accordion) player and later band leader in Boston. Senier ran away from home as a teenager, joining the Connaught Rangers and serving in the British Army in India and Iraq during World War I. After a rifle bullet damaged his left hand, Senier gave up his early pastimes of mandolin and fiddle, and switched to the melodeon, which relies largely on the right hand.

After his discharge from the military and a stint of civil service in Ireland, Senier immigrated to Boston in 1926. There he turned his large house into a performance space, charging admission to his house parties where Irish music was played by his friends and family, and beer served in his basement. Senier later formed his Emerald Isle Orchestra which played Boston venues, particularly Winslow Hall.
