= L. James DeWolfe Jr. =

American lawyer and politician

Member of the New Hampshire House of Representatives from the 19th Strafford district
- In office 1971–1973
- Preceded by: Keith H. Torr

Personal details
- Born: Louis James DeWolfe Jr. September 6, 1940 (age 85) Reading, Massachusetts, United States
- Party: Republican
- Education: Tufts University (BA); Suffolk University (JD)

Louis James DeWolfe Jr. (born September 6, 1940) is an American lawyer and politician who served one term as a member of the New Hampshire House of Representatives from 1971 to 1973. A native of Reading, Massachusetts, he graduated from Reading Memorial High School in 1958 and Tufts University in 1966.
