= Christopher E. Finerty =

US Air Force officer (born c. 1970)

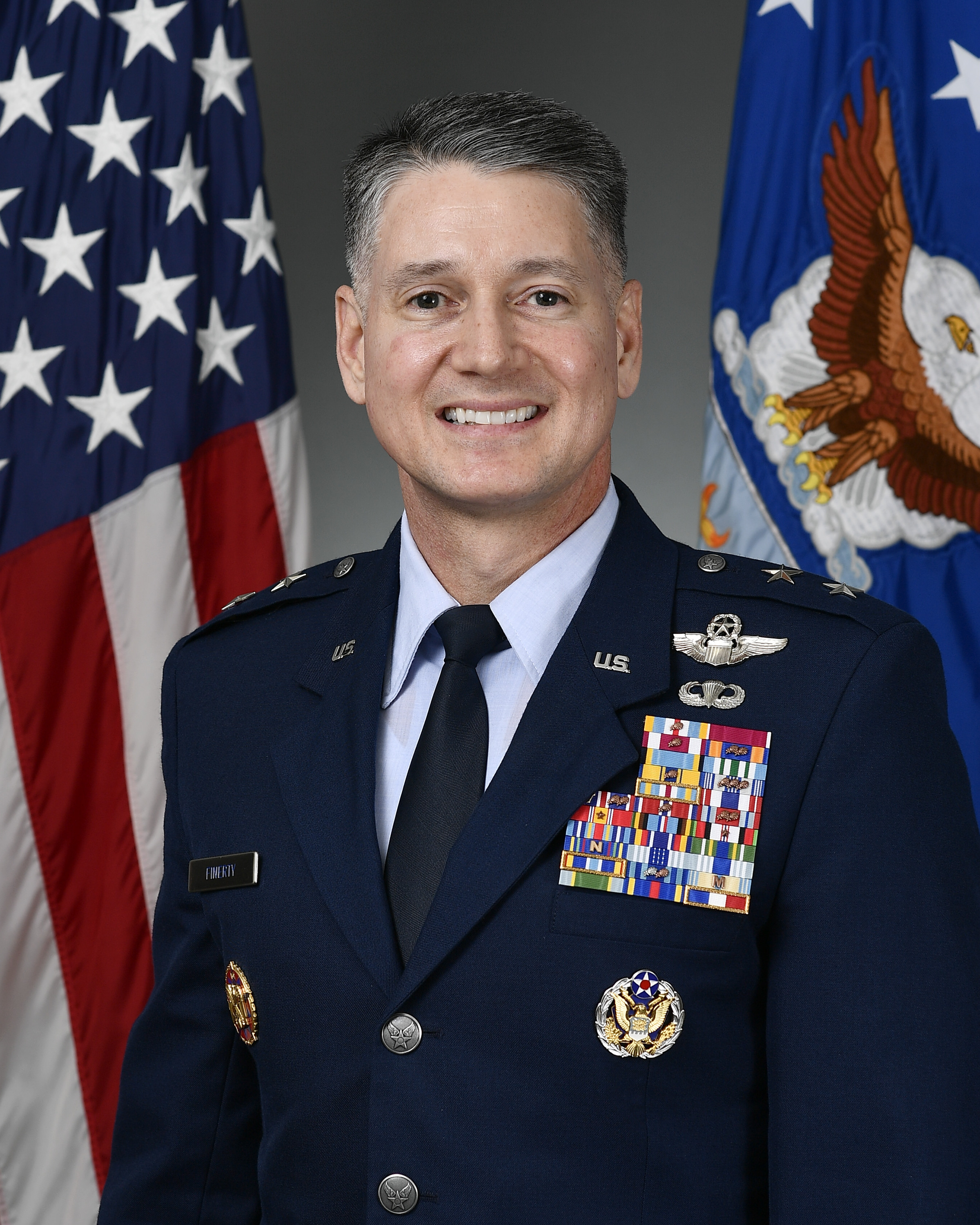
- Finerty in 2020
- Born: c. 1969 (age 56–57)
- Education: United States Air Force Academy (BS); Regis University (MBA)
- Military career
- Allegiance: United States
- Branch: United States Air Force
- Service years: 1992–2024
- Rank: Brigadier General, formerly Major General
- Conflicts: War in Afghanistan
- Awards: Defense Superior Service Medal (2); Legion of Merit

Brigadier General Christopher Finerty (born c. 1970) is a former United States Air Force officer and career helicopter pilot who served as the Director, Legislative Liaison, Office of the Secretary of the Air Force from 2019 to 2023.

Finerty received his commission from the United States Air Force Academy in 1992. He is a Command Pilot with more than 3,300 total flight hours, primarily in the T-37 Tweet, T-1 Jayhawk, UH-1N and HH-60G. Prior to his current assignment, Finerty was the Director, Office of Legislative Liaison at the National Guard Bureau.

Originally a Major General, he was demoted to Brigadier General after engaging in inappropriate relationships.

== Education ==
1992 Bachelor of Science, Engineering Science, United States Air Force Academy, Colorado Springs, Colo.
1997 Master of Business Administration, Regis University, Denver
1997 Squadron Officer School, Maxwell Air Force Base, Ala.
2006 Air Command and Staff College, Maxwell AFB, Ala., by correspondence
2011 Air War College, Maxwell AFB, Ala., by correspondence
2018 National Defense University, Capstone, Fort Lesley J. McNair, Washington, D.C.
2018 Senior Leader Orientation Course; Joint Base Andrews, Md. and JB San Antonio-Lackland, Texas
2018 National Security Studies Management Course, Syracuse University, N.Y.

== Military assignments ==
1. August 1992 – October 1993, Student, Undergraduate Pilot Training, Reese Air Force Base, Texas
2. October 1993 – February 1994, Rotary Wing Conversion Course, Fort Rucker, Ala.
3. February 1994 – May 1994, Student, UH-1N Training, Kirtland AFB, N.M.
4. May 1994 – May 1997, UH-1N Chief of Standardization and Evaluation, 37th Rescue Flight, F.E. Warren AFB, Wyo.
5. May 1997 – November 1997, Student, HH-60G Training, Kirtland AFB, N.M.
6. November 1997 – February 1999, HH-60G Assistant Flight Commander, 48th Rescue Squadron, Holloman AFB, N.M.
7. February 1999 – September 2002, Assistant Operations Officer, 33rd Rescue Squadron, Kadena Air Base, Japan
8. September 2002 – September 2005, HH-60G Evaluator Pilot, Kulis Air National Guard Base, Alaska
9. September 2005 – May 2008, Branch Chief, Combat Forces Requirements, National Guard Bureau, the Pentagon, Arlington, Va.
10. May 2008 – February 2010, Division Chief, Requirements Integration, National Guard Bureau, the Pentagon, Arlington, Va.
11. February 2010 – January 2012, Division Chief, Readiness, Congressional Appropriations Liaison, the Pentagon, Arlington, Va.
12. January 2012 – September 2015, Division Chief, Legislative Programs, National Guard Bureau, the Pentagon, Arlington, Va.
13. September 2015 – December 2016, Air National Guard Readiness Center Vice Commander, NGB, Joint Base Andrews, Md.
14. December 2016 – March 2017, Special Assistant to the Chief of the National Guard Bureau, the Pentagon, Arlington, Va.
15. March 2017 – April 2019, Director, Office of Legislative Liaison, NGB, the Pentagon, Arlington, Va.
16. April 2019–present, Director, Legislative Liaison, Office of the Secretary of the Air Force, the Pentagon, Arlington, Va.

== Effective dates of promotion ==
- Second Lieutenant (May 27, 1992)
- First Lieutenant (May 27, 1994)
- Captain (May 27, 1996)
- Major (November 1, 2002)
- Lieutenant Colonel (June 23, 2008)
- Colonel (May 24, 2012)
- Brigadier General (December 2, 2017)
- Major General (February 27, 2020)
- Brigadier General (Demoted, after September, 2023),

Military offices
Preceded by Steven L. Basham	Legislative Liaison of the United States Air Force; 2019–2023	Succeeded by Jennifer Short
