= Peadar de Burca =

Irish actor, playwright and comedian

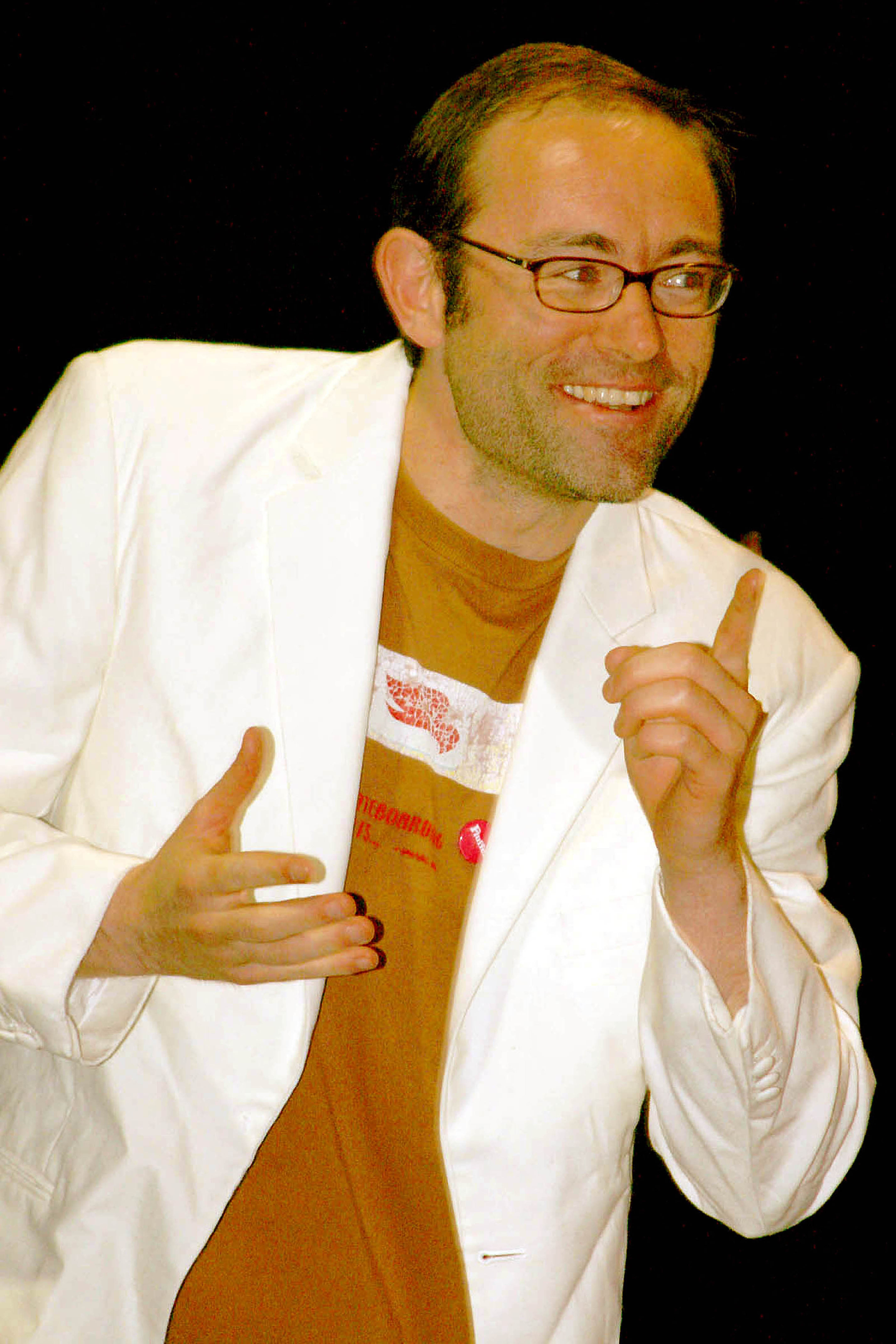
- Born: 1973, December 18th
- Occupations: Actor; playwright; comedian
- Notable work: "Why Men Cheat", "Uporczywie Pogodne Myśli"

Peadar de Burca is an Irish actor, playwright and comedian. He is from Galway City, County Galway and has gained recognition for his work in the entertainment industry.

De Burca first gained prominence as a theatre director, before transitioning to writing and performing in comedy shows that tour throughout Ireland. His comedic style and writing have been noted for their American influences, although he maintains a distinct Irish perspective.

De Burca has made appearances on television and radio, often taking an antagonistic approach. In one incident, the Irish broadcaster RTÉ received complaints after he referred to the Irish Prime Minister as 'Ireland's answer to Shrek'. Additionally, during a performance of his show "Why Men Cheat," De Burca was punched by a female audience member. The show is based on real stories of infidelity, and there was confusion over whether De Burca himself had cheated or not.

== Adaptations of films ==
De Burca has produced a number of stage adaptations of popular films. In 2002, he founded MorWax Productions and launched the company with a successful stage adaptation of Quentin Tarantino's "Reservoir Dogs".

The popularity of the production led to two additional adaptations of Tarantino's scripts, "Pulp Fiction" and "True Romance", which also enjoyed sell-out runs. These adaptations were known for their youthful casts and unique interpretations that differed from the original film productions.

De Burca declined offers to tour the "Tarantino" shows outside of Galway, where they were initially performed, instead focusing on producing other film adaptations. These included adaptations of "When Harry Met Sally...", "Charlie and the Chocolate Factory" and a version of "Psycho" produced by MorWax Productions but directed by Frances O'Rourke.

== Irish Theatre ==
Parallel to adapting film works for stage, De Burca directed a string of classical Irish stage shows, keeping in line with the MorWax philosophy of offering theatre for everyone. Three initial sell-out hits included Tom Murphy's Conversations on a Homecoming, John B. Keane's The Field and O'Casey's The Plough and the Stars. The latter is a notoriously difficult show to produce and had never been staged in Galway. It is always seen as a triumph for MorWax that the show sold out its week-long run at the Town Hall Theatre main stage, despite the company being non-funded and a hostile reaction from local press.

== Shakespearian Tragedies ==
Although an artistic city, Galway lacks the population to sustain longer theatrical runs and has a limited artistic programme. While companies visited with touring Shakespearian production, there was not yet a theatre company producing Shakespeare in Galway.

In 2004, De Burca mounted a successful period version of Macbeth. The thirty strong cast was supplemented by ten musicians and was remembered for its sword-fights and a strong performance from Emma Daly as Lady Macbeth. Buoyed by this success, De Burca tackled Hamlet the following year. In this production, ten actors played all the parts in a production that included audience participation, a ladder from the stage to the audience balcony and a Player's scene entrance where the actors cycled bikes among the audience. The production had no set, only two antique chests that were manipulated by the cast for whatever effect they desired. Playwright and novelist, John Arden assisted with the production in what many thought was MorWax's finest hour.

== Original Scripts ==
De Burca's foray into writing did not begin promisingly. His only writing credit had been a bilingual show during the 1993 Galway Arts Festival, Poitin Rock until his love of graphic novels pushed him to write an original stage version of Batman in 2005. The show was a highly ambitious production, staged in the cavernous Black Box Theatre Galway. With only six actors playing over twenty parts, martial arts, live music, puppets, singing and a three-level set, the show was a critical and commercial flop causing one blogger to write the headline, "Peadar De Burca stole eighty minutes of my life!". Many believe that the fall-out from this show forced De Burca in a new direction towards comedy.

=== Why Men Cheat ===
There are many different theories as to where the idea for Why Men Cheat came from. De Burca himself has said on record that the idea to write the show came to him in a dream, where former US President Bill Clinton told him to write a show with this title. It has been put to De Burca that he wrote the show form an autobiographical standpoint, an assertion that he has always denied. What is known, is that De Burca toured around Ireland and England interviewing men who cheated and women who were cheated on and collected their stories.

"Many of the guys I spoke to were real losers. These guys weren't James Bond type characters at all, they weren't the type of guys you'd like to hang around with. Most of them were really insecure."

The stories from these men and women were collected and condensed into a ninety-minute monologue driven show that became a hit up and down Ireland, first as a ten-man show, then more famously as a five-man show with each actor taking on more monologues. De Burca, initially wanted only to direct the show and refused to take part, potentially because it has been said that he wasn't confident about his abilities in delivering comedy directly to an audience. A week before the show opened in Galway, an actor dropped out and the author was forced to take the most demanding monologue, Cheating is Good, a monologue that demanded audience participation and various amounts of improvisation and ad-libbing. The opening night, according to De Burca;

"...Was a disaster. I'm sitting onstage with nine other actors having to listen to all these jokes I wrote in full view of the audience. The first set of shows were two hours long but with no break and all the actors were bricking it as they had no experience doing comedy monologues. No one laughed, some people thought the show was a self-help group for men who couldn't be faithful. And to top it all off, one of the women that I spoke to and whose monologue is the lynchpin of the show came and sat in the front row. It was horrible."

Fortunately, local reviewer for the Galway City Tribune Stephen Glennon gave the show a fierce review that set the trend and the production went from success to success around Ireland, playing to standing ovations almost everywhere. The show is still touring, as a one-man with De Burca himself doing all the parts, and is expected in the Hen and Chicken's Theatre, Islington, London, The New Theatre in Temple Bar, Dublin and the 2010 Edinburgh Festival Fringe.

Peadar began writing comedies for MorWax Productions in 2004 with the comedy Why Men Cheat which toured Ireland and was the surprise hit of the Dublin Fringe Festival 2006 where it played to packed out audiences in Andrew's Lane theatre in Dublin. The show is set to make its debut in New York, off-Broadway in June 2009.

To create this show, Peadar spent almost six months travelling around both Ireland and England interviewing men who had cheated on their partners and transformed their stories into an explosive mix of comedy and pathos. The show received a lot of media attention and led to Peadar writing his one – man comedy show, What Men Want. Seen as a follow up to Why Men Cheat it has toured to almost every theatre in Ireland and was written using the same interview technique that was so successful with Why Men Cheat.

Peadar has written three other plays, Like a Virgin, another monologue driven comedy that deals with the experiences of being a virgin in Ireland, Jane's Hero, a play based on the real life exploits of an Irish United Nations soldier who saved orphans in Sarajevo and How The West Was Won! which dealt with US president, Ronald Reagan's visit to Galway.

== Current Writing Work ==
Since March 2010, Peadar has been a regular columnist with Gazeta Wyborcza – Kocham Śląsk jak Irlandię. He is also a regular contributor to Elle Poland and recently begun a new column called Goldeneye for Papermint book magazine. De Burca is currently working on a book Why Men Cheat, based on his interviews with 250 unfaithful men. A premiere of his new show Sunshine is planned for February 2012 in Korez, Katowice.
