= J. D. Geoghegan =

American politician

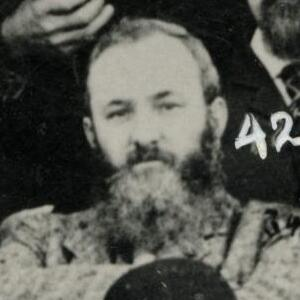
- Geoghegan in 1889

Member of the Washington House of Representatives
- In office 1889–1891

Personal details
- Born: December 25, 1842 Galway, Ireland
- Died: June 22, 1896 (aged 53) Vancouver, Washington, United States
- Party: Republican

John Dennis Geoghegan (December 25, 1842 – June 22, 1896) was an American politician in the state of Washington. He served in the Washington House of Representatives from 1889 to 1891.
