= Joseph E. Finerty =

American politician (1905–1992)

Joseph Edward Finerty (September 28, 1905 – November 7, 1992) was an American politician. He was the Democratic mayor of Gary, Indiana from 1943 to 1948. He was Gary's first Irish Catholic mayor. He defeated the Republican incumbent Ernst Schaible, the last Republican to hold the office, with 58% of the vote.

Finerty's election was the first Gary election in which a majority of voters in the all-black Midtown neighborhood voted for the Democratic rather than the Republican party. In 1945, Finerty became enmeshed in a bitter controversy over racial integration of Froebel High School (since closed). Backlash against his support for the school's pro-integration principal led him to withdraw his name from candidacy for reelection in 1947.

Upon retirement, Finerty had a personal estate of US$3 million, despite having made only $8,000 per year in salary.

== Works cited ==
- Keiser, Richard A. (1997). Subordination or Empowerment?: African-American Leadership and the Struggle for Urban Political Power. ISBN 0-19-507569-2.
- Lane, James B. (1979). City of the century: a history of Gary, Indiana. ISBN 0-253-11187-0.
